= Battle of Loschniza =

1812 battle during Napoleon's invasion of Russia

- Part of the French invasion of Russia
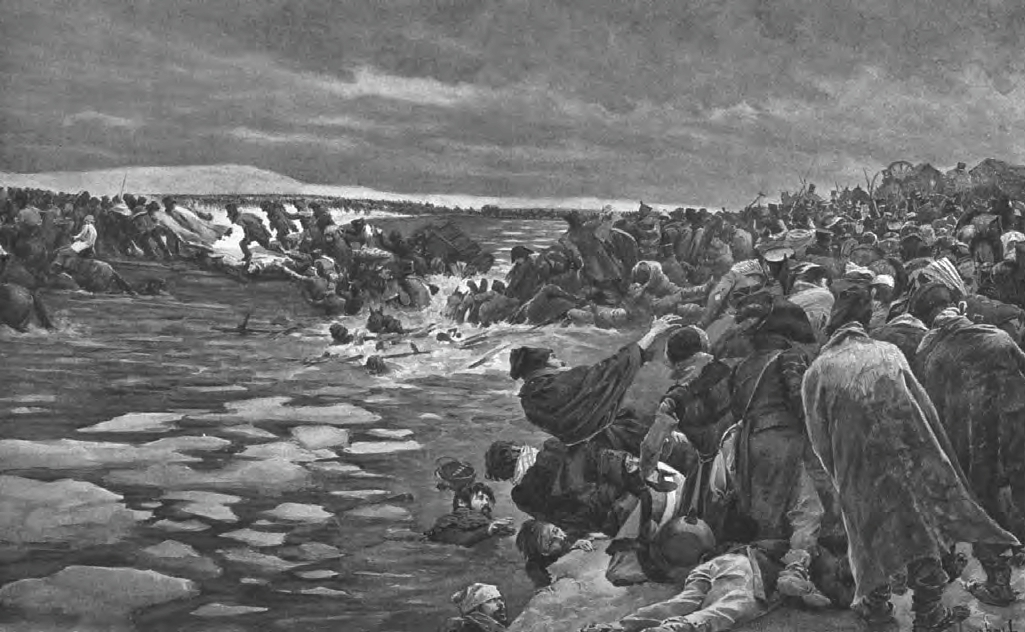
- Crossing of the Berezina by Felician Myrbach
Date	23 November 1812
Location	Loschniza, Minsk Governorate, Russian Empire 54°13′40″N 28°30′17″E
Result	French victory

Belligerents
(First French Empire) French Empire	Russian Empire

Commanders and leaders
(First French Empire) Nicolas Oudinot (First French Empire) Bertrand Castex	(Russian Empire) Pavel Chichagov (Russian Empire) Pavel Pahlen (Russian Empire) Aleksei Shcherbatov

Strength
3,600	2,800

Casualties and losses
Unknown	2,000

French invasion of Russia
current battle
Prussian corps
Napoleon
Austrian corps

The Battle of Loschniza (Loshnitsa) or the second battle of Borisov was a meeting engagement that took place on 23 November 1812, between parts of the French army and parts of the Russian armies. The French under Nicolas Oudinot defeated in detail the Russian troops under Pavel Chichagov.

== Background ==
The French had suffered a defeat just one week earlier during the Battle of Krasnoi. Napoleon's army amounted to no more than 20,000 combatants. However, the union with Victor, Oudinot and Dombrowski at the Bobr brought the numerical strength of the Grande Armée back up to some 49,000 French combatants as well as about 40,000 stragglers. But Minsk had been occupied by Chichagov on 16 November 1812 who reached the Berezina with about 31,500 combatants.

On the 21 November, the Russians under Lambert had occupied Borisov in the morning before Oudinot could come up as the sentries had been ambushed. Dombrowski had about 2,000 men left. The Russians casualties were about 2,000, including Lambert, mortally wounded. On 22 November Oudinot got to Loshnitsa, where Corbineau's brigade united with him. But the Russians had destroyed the bridge at Borisov on the same day and held occupied the far bank.

== Battle ==
On 23 November, Chichagov took the majority of his army across the Beresina at Borisov and his advance guard under Pavel Pahlen (who replaced wounded Charles Lambert) intended to reach Loschniza by the order of Chichagov. Chichagov wrote to Kutuzov that he wanted to reach Bobr before Napoleon and that such a movement, threatening Victor's rear, would force the latter to retreat and then Chichagov would open a connection with Peter Wittgenstein. The Russian troops near Borisov were ordered to cook porridge, and some cavalry was placed on foraging. Pahlen asked for reinforcements because his troops consisted mainly of cavalry, which had difficulty moving through the forest terrain. It never came. The advance guard continued to move and attacked Oudinot's van under Bertrand Castex without waiting to be reinforced (as Chichagov told Pahlen to immediately occupy Loschniza) and was thrashed. The Russians were pursued until they reached Borisov. Oudinot marched to the town, the defense of which was entrusted to Aleksei Shcherbatov, who held Oudinot's French until the artillery and other heavy goods could cross. Finally, Oudinot ejected the Russians; Shcherbatov crossed the river back with great difficulty.

== Aftermath ==
The damage of the Borisov bridge increased the danger for the remains of the Grande Armée that was surrounded by three Russian armies and was no longer strong enough for a breakthrough. A quick construction of a new bridge had to be done and Oudinot had forded the Beresina at Studienka on 22 November, see Battle of Berezina.

== See also ==
- List of battles of the French invasion of Russia
