= Battle of Hanau order of battle =

The Hanau order of battle shows the forces engaged at the 1813 battle of Hanau, during the War of the Sixth Coalition, when a French force under Emperor of the French Napoleon I defeated a vastly superior Austro-Bavarian force commanded by General Karl Philipp von Wrede.

== Order of battle ==
=== Coalition army ===
==== Austrian Corps ====
The Austrian and Bavarian army at the battle of Hanau numbered 42,000 men: 33,000 infantrymen, 9,000 cavalrymen and 94 artillery pieces. These men were under the overall command of Bavarian General Karl Philipp von Wrede and comprised two Army Corps, one Austrian and one Bavarian.

The Austrian Corps, under the command of Field-Marshal-Lieutenant Baron Hennequin de Fresnel, numbered 24,000 men: 18,000 infantrymen (18 battalions), 6,000 cavalrymen (32 squadrons) and 34 artillery pieces. These men were organised in three divisions:

- 1st division, under General Bach:
  - Brigade Hardegg:
    - 3rd Jäger regiment (1 bat.)
    - 1st "Sleker" regiment (2 bat.)
    - one 6-pounder foot battery (4 cannons)
  - Brigade Volkmann:
    - "Archduke Rudolph" regiment (4 bat.)
    - "Jordis" regiment (4 bat.)
    - one six-pounder foot battery (6 cannons)
- 2nd division, under General Trautenberg:
  - Brigade Diemar:
    - Grenadier battalions: "Kramer", "de Pest", "Frich" (3 bat.)
    - one 6-pounder foot battery (4 cannons)
  - Brigade Klenau:
    - Grenadier battalions: "Mossel", "Puttean", "Possman", "Lany" (4 bat.)
    - one 6-pounder foot battery (4 cannons)
- Cavalry Division, under General Spleny:
  - Brigade Minutillo:
    - "Archduke Joseph" hussar regiment (6 sq.)
    - "Frimont" hussar regiment (6 sq.)
    - "Szekler" hussar regiment (4 sq.)
  - Brigade Sprethy:
    - "Knesevich" dragoon regiment (6 sq.)
    - "Schwartzenberg" uhlans (6 sq.)
    - "Prince von Liechtenstein" cuirassiers (4 sq.)
  - Brigade Stwrtnick:
    - one 12-pounder position battery (6 cannons)
    - two 6-pounder foot batteries (12 cannons)
    - 1 pioneer company

==== Bavarian Corps ====
The Bavaria Corps came under the direct command of General von Wrede, and included 18,000 men: 15,000 infantrymen (17 battalions), 3,000 cavalrymen (20 squadrons) and 60 artillery pieces. They were divided into 2 infantry divisions, a cavalry reserve and an artillery reserve:

- 2nd division, under General Beckers:
  - Brigade Pappenheim:
    - 4th Line regiment (1 bat.)
    - 5th Light regiment (1 bat.)
    - 4th national regiment: Salzburg (1 bat.)
    - 9th national regiment: Regensburg (1 bat.)
  - Brigade Zollern:
    - 6th Line regiment (2 bat.)
    - 13th national regiment: Innsbruck (1 bat.)
    - 14th national regiment: Anspach (1 bat.)
  - Brigade Caspers:
    - one 6-pounder horse battery (6 cannons)
    - one 6-pounder foot battery (8 cannons)
- 3rd division, under general Lamotte:
  - Brigade Von der Stockh:
    - 11th Line regiment (2 bat.)
    - 7th Line regiment (1 bat.)
  - Brigade Deroy:
    - 5th Line regiment (1 bat.)
    - 8th Line regiment (1 bat.)
    - 9th Line regiment (1 bat.)
    - 8th national regiment: Munich (1 bat.)
    - 6th national regiment: Lindau (1 bat.)
  - Brigade Wagener:
    - one 6-pounder horse battery (6 cannons)
    - one 6-pounder foot battery (6 cannons)
- Cavalry Reserve:
  - Brigade Bieregg:
    - 1st chevaulegers (3 sq.)
    - 2nd chevaulgegers (3 sq.)
    - 7th chevaulegers (4 sq.)
  - Brigade Ellbracht:
    - 3rd chevaulegers (3 sq.)
    - 6th chevaulegers (3 sq.)
  - Brigade Dietz:
    - 4th chevaulegers (3 sq.)
    - 5th chevaulegers (1 sq.)
- Artillery Reserve:
  - Brigade Cologne:
    - one 6-pounder horse battery (6 cannons)
    - one 6-pounder foot battery (8 cannons)
    - three 12-pounder foot batteries (18 cannons)

=== The French Army ===
The French Grande Armée was in full retreat after a decisive defeat at the battle of Leipzig, where it sustained high losses. In theory, Napoleon could count on 110 battalions and numerous cavalry, however, in practice many of the French battalions and squadrons numbered no more than 100 men and some were reduced to cadres, with entire regiments aligning no more than 10 men. In total, Napoleon had no more than 30,000 men available for the battle and not all of these men were committed. These men were divided in several army Corps, each under the command of a Marshal or very senior General of Division. At the battle of Hanau, only one division of MacDonald's XIth Corps and one division of Victor's IInd Corps were engaged, alongside the Guard infantry, cavalry and artillery.

==== II Corps ====
The IInd Corps was under the command of Marshal Victor. The only unit engaged was:

- 4th division under General Dubreton:
  - 24th Line regiment (4 bat.)
  - 10th Line regiment (4 bat.)
  - Brigade Brun:
    - 37th Line (3 bat.)
    - 56th Line (4 bat.)

==== XI Corps ====
The XIth Corps was under the command of Marshal Jacques MacDonald. The only unit engaged was:

- 36th division under General Henri-François-Marie Charpentier,
  - brigade Simmer:
    - 6th Line regiment (2 bat.)
    - 112th Line regiment (4 bat.)
  - brigade Meunier:
    - 14th Light regiment (3 bat.)
    - 3rd Line regiment (2 bat.)

==== II Cavalry Corps ====
The II Cavalry Corps (around 3,000 men) was under the command of General Horace François Bastien Sébastiani de La Porta:

- 2nd light cavalry division:
  - 7th Brigade, Gérard:
    - 2nd chevau-légers (3 sq.)
    - 11th chasseurs (3 sq.)
    - 12th chasseurs (3 sq.)
- Division of Nicolas-François Roussel d'Hurbal:
  - 8th Brigade, Dommanges:
    - 4th chevau-légers (3 sq.)
    - 5th hussars (3 sq.)
    - 9th hussars (4 sq.)
- 4th light cavalry division, under General Rémi Joseph Isidore Exelmans:
  - 9th Brigade, Maurin:
    - 6th chevau-légers (2 sq.)
    - 4th chasseurs (2 sq.)
    - 7th chasseurs (3 sq.)
    - 20th chasseurs (4 sq.)
  - 10th Brigade, Pierre Watier:
    - 23 chasseurs (4 sq.)
    - 24 chasseurs (3 sq.)
    - 11th hussars (2 sq.)
- 2nd cuirassiers division, under General Antoine-Louis Decrest de Saint-Germain:
  - Brigade Daugeranville:
    - 1st Carabiniers-à-Cheval (2 sq.)
    - 2nd Carabiniers-à-Cheval (2 sq.)
    - 1st Cuirassiers (2 sq.)
  - Brigade Nicolas Marin Thiry:
    - 5th Cuirassiers (3 sq.)
    - 8th Cuirassiers (2 sq.)
    - 10th Cuirassiers (2 sq.)

==== Imperial Guard ====
Imperial Guard infantry and artillery (6,000 men), under the command of General Antoine Drouot:

- 1st Old Guard division under General Louis Friant:
  - Brigade Christiani:
    - 1st foot chasseurs à pied regiment (2 bat.)
    - 2nd chasseurs à pied regiment (2 bat.)
  - Brigade Michel
    - 1st grenadiers à pied regiment (2 bat.)
    - 2nd grenadiers à pied regiment (2 bat.)
- 2nd Old Guard division, under the command of General Philibert Jean-Baptiste Curial
  - Fusiliers chasseurs (2 bat.)
  - Fusiliers grenadiers (2 bat.)
  - Vélites of Turin (1 bat.)
  - Vélites of Florence (1 bat.)
- Guard Artillery, under the command of General Charles-François Dulauloy
  - Foot artillery: 40 pieces
  - Horse artillery: 12 pieces
  - Pontooners and workers

Imperial Guard cavalry (4,000 men), under the command of General Etienne de Nansouty:

- 1st division under Philippe Antoine d'Ornano:
  - Brigade Pierre David de Colbert-Chabanais
    - Berg lancers (6 sq.)
    - 2e régiment de chevau-légers lanciers de la Garde Impériale (10 sq.)
  - Brigade Pinteville:
    - Dragoons of the Young Guard (2 sq.)
- 2nd division under Charles Lefebvre-Desnouettes:
  - Brigade Bertrand Pierre Castex:
    - 1er régiment de chevau-légers lanciers polonais de la Garde impériale, Young Guard (4 sq.)
    - Chasseurs à Cheval de la Garde Impériale, Young Guard (4 sq.)
    - Grenadiers à Cheval de la Garde Impériale, Young Guard (2 sq.)
- 3rd division under Frédéric Henri Walther:
  - Brigade Jean-Dieudonné Lion:
    - 1er régiment de chevau-légers lanciers polonais de la Garde impériale, Old Guard (3 sq.)
    - 4th Gardes d'Honneur (4 sq.)
    - Chasseurs à Cheval de la Garde Impériale, Old Guard (6 sq.)
  - Brigade Louis-Michel Letort de Lorville:
    - 1st Gardes d'Honneur (4 sq.)
    - Dragoons of the Old Guard (4 sq.)
    - 2nd Gardes d'Honneur (4 sq.)
  - Brigade Louis-Marie Lévesque de Laferrière:
    - Grenadiers à Cheval de la Garde Impériale, Old Guard (4 sq.)
    - 3rd Gardes d'Honneur (4 sq.)

== Sources ==
- (in French) Mir, Jean-Pierre - „Hanau et Montmirail, La Garde donne et vainc”, Histoire et Collections, ISBN 978-2-35250-086-5
