= Bertrand Pierre Castex =

French general (1771–1842)

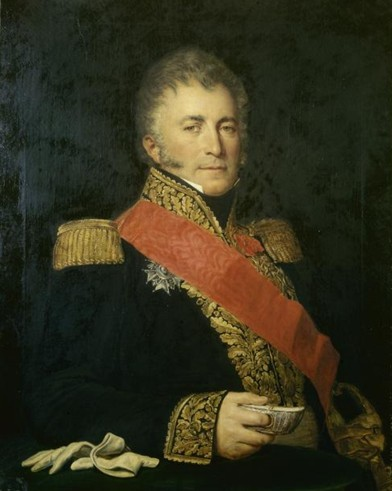
- Born: 29 June 1771; Pavie (Gers), France
- Died: 19 April 1842 (aged 70); Strasbourg, France
- Military career
- Allegiance: France
- Branch: Cavalry
- Service years: 1792–1830
- Rank: General de division
- Conflicts: French Revolutionary Wars; Napoleonic Wars
- Awards: Grand Officer of the Legion of Honour; Knight of Saint Louis

Bertrand Pierre Castex (French pronunciation: [bɛʁtʁɑ̃ pjɛʁ kastɛks]; 29 June 1771 – 19 April 1842) was a French cavalry general whose career spanned the Revolutionary and Napoleonic Wars, rising from a volunteer trooper to general of division through sustained battlefield distinction.

The son of a Gascon innkeeper and originally intended for a legal career, Castex joined the revolutionary forces in 1792 and gained early experience in the Pyrenees and Italy before emerging as a talented light cavalry commander. His charge at Jena in 1806 earned Napoleon's personal praise and rapid promotion, followed by hard fighting at Eylau, Friedland, and in the 1809 campaign against Austria, where his exploits at Amstetten and Wagram led to his elevation to general.

Castex commanded a cavalry brigade on the northern flank during the invasion of Russia, fighting at Klyastitsy, Polotsk, and the Berezina, and despite repeated wounds continued to serve in the German and Belgian campaigns of 1813–1814, finishing his career in the Empire as a senior officer in the Imperial Guard. Under the Bourbon Restoration he was retained in high command, accumulated major honours, served briefly as a deputy, and remained a respected military figure until his death in 1842, with his name commemorated on the Arc de Triomphe.

== Origins and early life ==
Bertrand Castex was born on 29 June 1771 in the village of Pavie in Gascony. His parents were Blaise Castex (1737–1808), a baker and innkeeper, and his wife Marianne Semont (1745–1777). A younger sister, Jeanne, was born in 1774 before his mother's death three years later. Blaise remarried in 1781, but had no further children.

The Castex family had operated the inn in Pavie for generations, but Blaise Castex had higher ambitions for his son, intending to make him a lawyer. Young Bertrand was sent to the college in Auch at the age of ten, and from there went on to the University of Toulouse. However, with the coming of the French Revolution, a military career beckoned.

== French Revolutionary Wars ==
On 12 August 1792, at a ceremony in front of Auch town hall, Castex was one of many who joined a troop of volunteers to maintain public order and defend revolutionary institutions in the Gers. He was elected quartermaster sergeant the same day. Sent to fight in the Western Pyrenees, these troops took part in the battle of Sans Culottes Camp before returning to Auch and being incorporated into the regular army as the 24th Chasseurs à Cheval.

In 1796, Castex, now a lieutenant, went to serve in the Army of Italy. He was aide-de-camp to general Kilmaine during the Siege of Mantua. He took park in the taking of Verona, after which he was promoted to captain on 7 January 1797.

In 1800 Castex was back on the Spanish border, and took part in the War of the Oranges under Gouvion Saint-Cyr. He was promoted to chef d'escadron and made a knight of the Legion of Honour on the order's first creation. On 29 October 1803, he transferred to the 20th Chasseurs à Cheval with the rank of Major.

== Napoleonic Wars ==
Castex was assigned to the Grande Armée at the opening of the War of the Fourth Coalition in 1806. As the 7th Chasseurs à Cheval started the campaign without a suitable officer to lead them, their command was temporarily given to Major Castex. It was at the head of this regiment that he led a dramatic charge at the battle of Jena under the eyes of Napoleon himself. Afterwards, the Emperor told him: "I have long known that the Chasseurs were superior to the Saxons and Prussians; the 7th has just given proof of this. You are a brave man; I appoint you colonel." As the colonel of Castex's own regiment had been killed in action during the battle, Castex was promoted to command the 20th Chasseurs in his place. As the campaign continued into Poland, he led this regiment in the battles of Eylau and Friedland. In 1807 he was rewarded by being made first an Officer and then a Commander of the Legion of Honour, and also a Baron of the Empire with an income of 4,000 francs from the Kingdom of Westphalia.

In the 1809 campaign against Austria, Castex's regiment was part of Colbert's "Infernal Brigade" in Oudinot's II Corps. After the victories in Bavaria in April, Castex was able to write:

Three battles, three combats, and as many victories and I am doing well. Bavaria is entirely evacuated and we are marching on Vienna where we will without a doubt arrive in less than a month. The newspapers will give you the other details, until then I am mounting up to be the advance guard of the army.

Near Amstetten, Castex at the head of his regiment defeated a force composed of a regiment of Uhlans, one of Hussars, and an infantry battalion. This feat was reported in the 6th bulletin of the Grande Armée, dated Sankt Pölten, 9 May. At the battle of Wagram he captured an infantry square, and was rewarded with promotion to general de brigade.

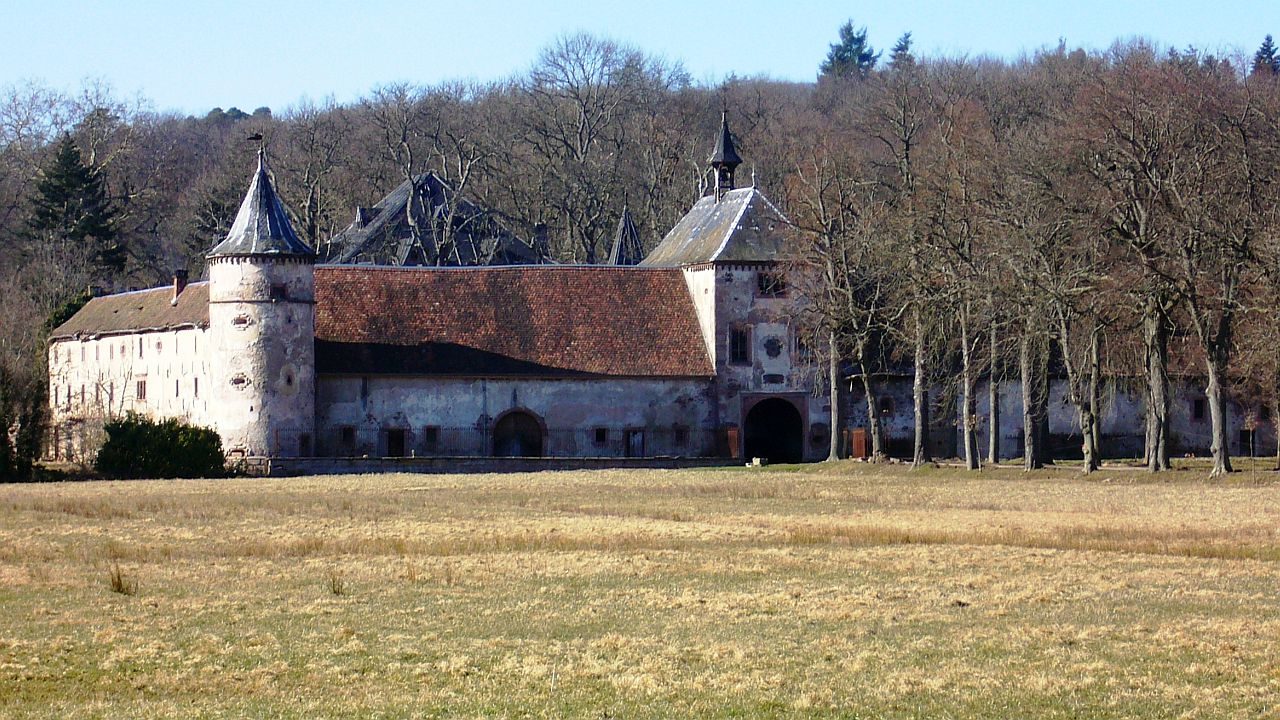
The Château de Thanvillé, which became Castex's home after his marriage to Adélaïde de Dartein.

In the three years of relative peace that followed the Treaty of Schönbrunn, Castex had a series of postings in Germany, the low countries and Northern France. Notably, he was inspector of cavalry in the 5th Military Division in Strasbourg when he married Adélaïde de Dartein, daughter of a prominent local magnate and heiress to the chateau of Thanvillé. With war with Russia looming, he took command of a cavalry brigade in Münster in November 1811 that would go on to form part of Oudinot's II Corps.

During the invasion of Russia the following year, Oudinot's corps operated on the northern flank of the Grande Armée. Castex's brigade consisted of the 23rd and 24th Chasseur à Cheval regiments, with a combined strength strength at the beginning of the campaign of 1643 men. Castex fought at the battle of Klyastitsy, where he charged at the head of one of his regiments and took 400 prisoners, and the first and second battles of Polotsk. Rejoining the main army on their retreat from Moscow, he led Oudinot's vanguard in the battle of Loschniza, and was wounded in the thigh by a bayonet at the crossing of the Berezina before leading the way on the army's retreat from Borisov to Vilnius. By the end of January 1813, the brigade was in Custrin with a strength of 212 men.

During the retreat, Oudinot had introduced Castex to Napoleon saying "Sire, I present to you General Castex; he has as many successes as battles." On 9 February 1813 he was rewarded by being made a Major in the Mounted Grenadiers of the Imperial Guard. In the German campaign of 1813 he was assigned to the division of Jean-Pierre Doumerc, was wounded at the battles of Dresden and Altenburg, going on to serve at Leipzig and at Hanau. He was promoted to general de division on 28 November 1813.

The following year Castex served in Belgium, at first under Lefebvre-Desnouettes and then Maison, leading a division of 4,000 guard cavalry. He was shot in the chest while conducting a reconnaissance near Liège, but continued to serve, fighting at the battle of Courtrai. Days later, Paris fell and Napoleon abdicated.

On the restoration of the Bourbons, Castex was placed on reserve when the Imperial Guard was disbanded, but he was made a Knight of Saint Louis by the new regime on 13 August 1814. He rejoined the colours during the Hundred Days and commanded the cavalry of Claude Lecourbe's Army of the Jura. After Napoleon's defeat he retired again to his estate in Val-de-Villé.

== Later career ==
Two years later, Castex was back in favour. On 3 September 1817 he was given command of the 5th Military Division in Strasbourg, transferring to command the 6th Division in Besançon the following month – a post he would hold until 1823. He was made a Grand Officer of the Legion of Honour on 24 August 1820, a Commander of the Order of Saint Louis the following year, and a Viscount on 17 August 1822. When Spain was invaded in 1823, Castex was given command of a division of dragoons. He was rewarded with the Grand Cross of the Order of Saint Ferdinand by Ferdinand VII. On 6 March 1824 he was elected to the Chamber of Deputies representing Bas-Rhin. He sat among the moderate royalists and voted with them. He was made Grand Cross of the Order of Saint Louis on 3 November 1827, but not re-elected to the Chamber. He lost his command after the July Revolution and returned to Alsace, becoming a member of the Bas-Rhin General Council.

== Family ==
Castex was married in Strasbourg on 29 September 1810 to Félicité Marguerite Geneviève Adélaïde de Dartein (1788–1856). The couple had ten children, seven of whom lived to adulthood:

- Charles Pierre Victor (1814–1848), Captain in the infantry, killed in Algeria.
- Adélaïde-Zoé (1815–1903), married Paul-Romain Chaperon, engineer and officer of the Legion of Honour.
- Sophie Stéphanie (1822–1856), married Francois Furcy Deval.
- Ernestine (1825–1911), married Jean-Alexandre de Fleurans, director of the Strasbourg arsenal and officer of the Legion of Honour.
- Jules Marie (1826–1853), 2nd Lieutenant in the 13th Chasseurs à Cheval
- Théodore (1828–1898), Chamberlain to Napoleon III
- Félicité (1830–1849)

== Death and legacy ==
Bertrand Castex died in Strasbourg on 19 April 1842 (aged 70) and buried in the cemetery at Thanvillé. A street in Paris was named after him, and his name appears on the Arc de Triomphe. His portrait was painted by Alfred Touchemolin and hangs in the Musée historique de Strasbourg.
