= Tatiana Birich =

Belarusian ophthalmologist

Deputy Chairman of the Supreme Soviet of the Byelorussian Soviet Socialist Republic
- In office 1963–1967

Personal details
- Born: 1905 Loshnitsa, Minsk region, Russian Empire
- Died: 1993 Minsk, Belarus
- Education: Belarusian State University

Tatiana Vasilyevna Birich (Cyrillic: Татьяны Бирич; also romanized as Tatyana) was a Belarusian ophthalmologist who served as the Deputy Chairman of the Supreme Soviet of the BSSR from 1963 to 1967.

== Biography ==
Born Tatyana Vasilyevna in 1905 in the small village of Loshnitsa, in the Borisov district of the Minsk region, she lived in the family of a village teacher. After the revolution, she worked as a primary school teacher in the same school as her teacher father, Vasily Birich. She attained a degree from the recently founded Belarusian State University, and upon graduating in 1928, Birich chose ophthalmology as her course of study.

Birich became a resident at the 1st Soviet Hospital in the Department of Eye Diseases and began her professional career and a postgraduate student at the Academy of Sciences of the BSSR. While on her secondment to the Moscow Medical Institute and successfully defended her thesis in the capital.

Birich then was sent to the Institute of Experimental Ophthalmology in Odesa, where Vladimir Filatov was working at the time.

In 1939, Birich returned again to Minsk to work in the Department of Eye Diseases as an associate professor. However, World War II would soon begin and impact Minsk, which is occupied by German troops. Birich evacuated patients and staff, assisting in general management while the hospital endures an air raid and bombing. She ended up in Saratov where she worked throughout the war, as an assistant then as the Head of Eye Diseases in the local medical institute.
