= Pavel Chichagov =

Russian military commander (1767–1849)

Pavel Vasilyevich Chichagov
- Павел Васильевич Чичагов
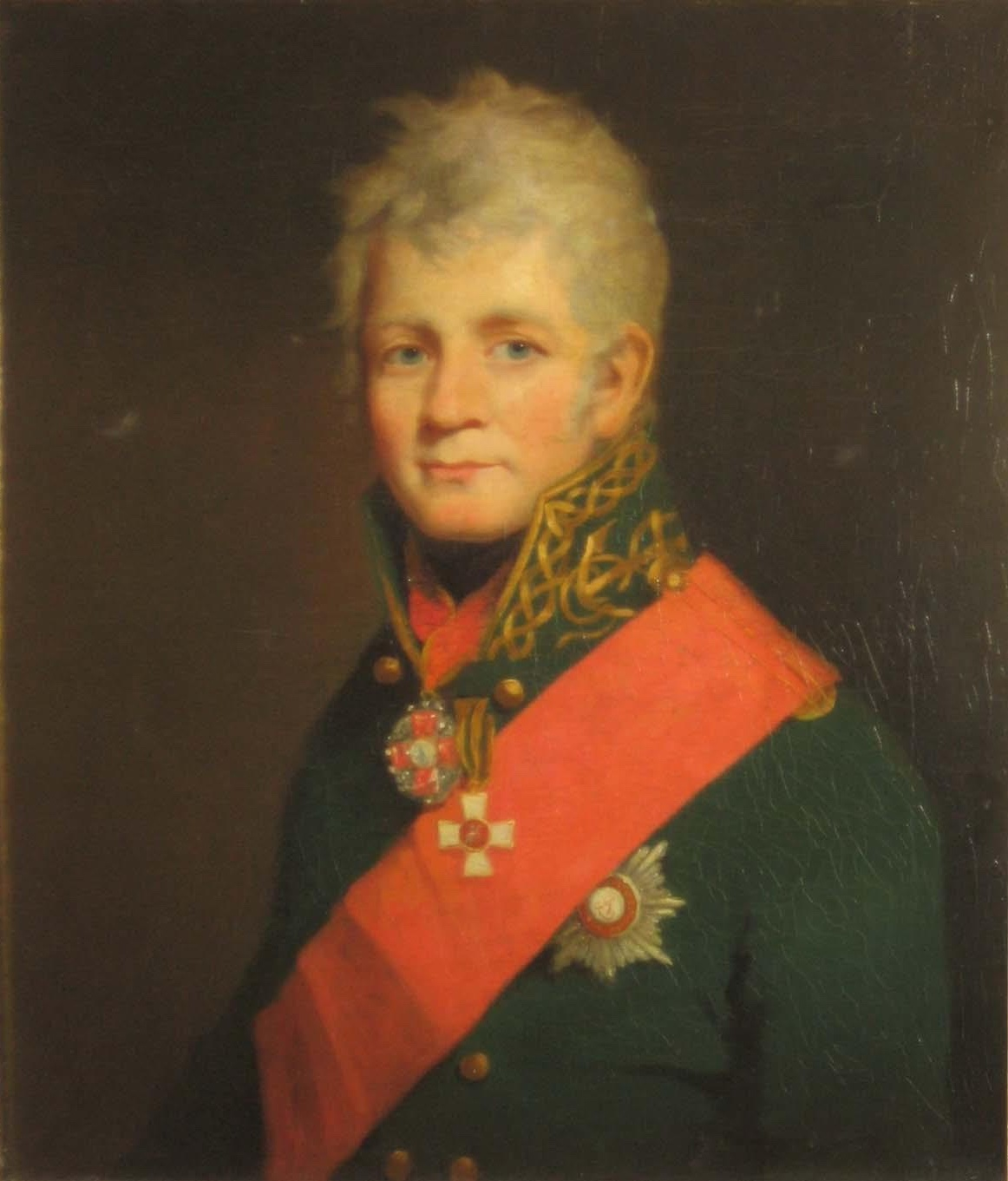
- Portrait by James Saxon, 1824
- Born: 8 July 1767; Saint Petersburg, Russia
- Died: 20 August 1849 (aged 82); Paris, France
- Relatives: Vasily Chichagov (father)
- Military career
- Allegiance: Russia
- Branch: Imperial Russian Navy; Imperial Russian Army
- Rank: Admiral
- Conflicts: French invasion of Russia; Battle of Loschniza; Battle of Berezina

Pavel Vasilyevich Chichagov or Tchichagov (Russian: Па́вел Васи́льевич Чича́гов; 8 July [O.S. 27 June] 1767 – 1 September [O.S. 20 August] 1849) was a Russian army and naval commander of the Napoleonic Wars.

== Biography ==
He was born in 1767 in Saint Petersburg, the son of Admiral Vasily Chichagov and his English wife. At the age of 12 he was enlisted in the Guard. In 1782 he served in a campaign in the Mediterranean as an aide to his father. He served with distinction in the Russian-Swedish War of 1788–1790, where he commanded the Rostislav and was awarded the Order of St. George, fourth degree, and a golden sword with the inscription "For Courage".

After the war, he studied at the Royal Naval Academy. While there, he met Elizabeth Proby, the daughter of a commissioner at the Chatham Dockyard, and became engaged to her. When he returned to Russia in 1796, he applied for permission to marry but was told by Paul I "there are sufficient brides in Russia; there is no need to look for one in England." Some violence followed and Chichagov was sent to prison. He was soon pardoned, given permission to marry Elizabeth, and promoted to rear admiral. In 1802, Alexander I, Paul's successor, promoted Chichagov to Vice Admiral and made him a member of the Committee on Navy Reorganization. In 1807, he was promoted to Admiral and appointed Minister of the Navy.

Chichagov resigned and traveled in Europe in 1809–1811. Elizabeth died in 1811. In 1812, Alexander recalled him and appointed him Commander in Chief of the newly formed Third Western Army, and Governor-General of Moldavia and Wallachia. However, the 1812 Treaty of Bucharest ended the Russo-Turkish War by the time he took command of the Army of the Danube.

During the 1812 campaign against Napoleon, he was blamed for letting Napoleon escape at the Berezina River in November 1812. In 1813, he was dismissed and the following year went to France on a furlough, never to return to Russia. He remained a member of the State Council until 1834 but was then removed from that position, and his properties confiscated. He died in Paris in 1849 where, after his death, his memoirs were published.

== Sources ==
- "Чичагов, Павел Васильевич" . Brockhaus and Efron Encyclopedic Dictionary (in Russian). 1906.
