= Adieu (short story) =

Short story by Honoré de Balzac

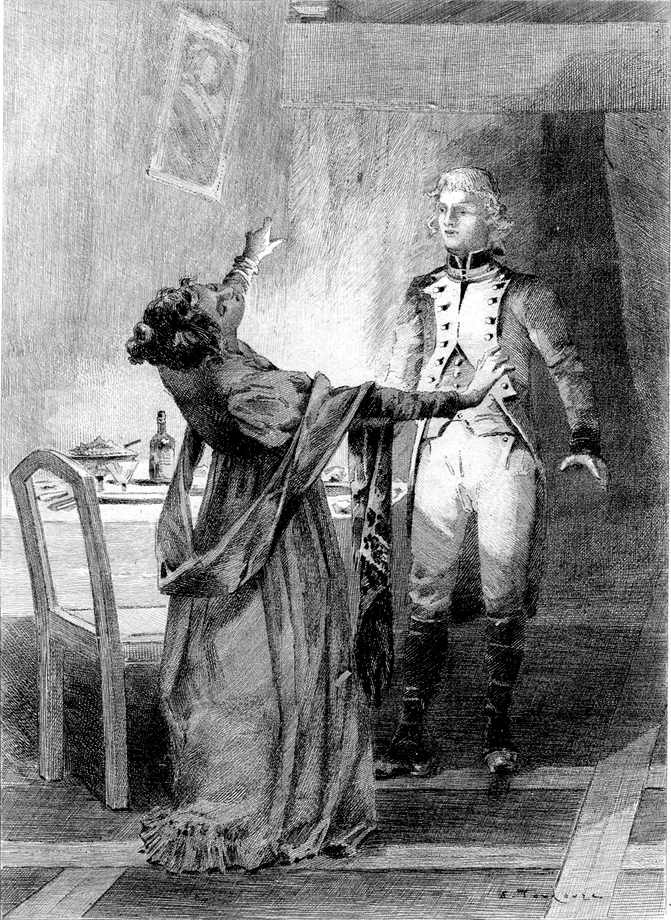
- Illustration by Édouard Toudouze
- Author: Honoré de Balzac
- Language: French
- Series: La Comédie humaine
- Publication date: 1830
- Publication place: France

Adieu (English "Farewell") is a short story by Honoré de Balzac. It was published in 1830 in La Mode. It is one of the Études philosophiques of La Comédie humaine.

== Plot summary ==
In 1819, two men, Baron Philippe de Sucy and Marquis d'Albon get lost while out hunting near L'Isle-Adam. They come across an old manor house and stop to look at it. They see a young woman, who calls out "Adieu" to them and runs away. De Sucy faints, and d'Albon helps him to get away in a carriage which happens to be passing by. They are told that the young woman is Comtesse Stephanie de Vandieres and that she is insane. Afterwards, d'Albon revisits the old house and meets its owner, who tells him about Stephanie, who is his niece. In 1812, the Comtesse, and her much older husband were in Russia taking part in Napoleon's invasion. The Comte was a general, and Philippe was also in the army with them. On November 28, 1812, Philippe had escorted them to the eastern bank of the Beresina river, where they stopped for the night along with much of the rest of Napoleon's retreating army. A temporary bridge had been built to allow the army to cross.

Philippe briefly goes away to feed his hungry horse. When he comes back he finds that the Comte and Comtesse are sitting at a campfire with a number of hungry and cold French soldiers. They have made the fire from some of the contents of the carriage. When the soldiers see Philippe, one of them shoots his horse, and the horse is cooked and everyone shares the meat. The next morning, the Russian army is seen gathering on the hills overlooking the Beresina. The French army is in a panic to cross the river, but the bridge is set alight by the French soldiers on the other side to stop the Russian advance. Philippe and a grenadier then attack some Russian soldiers in order to steal their horses. They hitch the horses to the Comte's carriage, and get the Comte and Comtesse on board, and hurry towards the river. By the time they get there, the bridge has been totally destroyed.

Philippe then suggests making a raft from some of the bridge debris. When it is finished, a lot of soldiers rush on board, and there is only room for the Comte, the Comtesse and the grenadier. Stephanie calls out "Adieu" to Philippe as the raft leaves. So the raft crosses over without Philippe who is captured by the Russians, and remains a prisoner of war in Siberia for a number of years. The Comte fell off the raft and died in the crossing. The Comtesse and the grenadier were separated in the confusion afterwards. She spent two years in an asylum in Germany before escaping and eventually making her way back to France, where she was eventually recognised and found by her uncle.

The story then returns to 1819. Stephanie is now insane, and when she speaks only says the word "Adieu". Her only friend is a young peasant woman, Genevieve who is also insane. Philippe who is in love with her, visits frequently, but finds that she does not remember him. He decides to try to cure her. He returns to his own estate near Saint-Germain, and remodels it to resemble the landscape near the Beresina river. He also hires many local peasants to dress up to resemble the French soldiers of 1812. In January 1820, when it is snowy, he invites Stephanie and her uncle to his estate. He hopes that the resemblance to the scene at the Beresina in 1812 will revive her memory. It is successful, and she does recognise Philippe, and they embrace. But she then dies. Some time later, Philippe commits suicide.

== Themes ==
Balzac had planned to write a number of stories in the Scènes de la vie militaire section of La Comedie humaine, but only completed two, Les Chouans and Une passion dans le désert. However, Adieu is one of a number of works from other parts of La Comedie humaine along with Le Médecin de campagne, El Verdugo and others which depict military scenes from the Revolutionary and Napoleonic Wars.

The story reflects Balzac's interest in the medicine of his time, in particular the work done by Jean-Étienne Dominique Esquirol in the area of mental illness.
