= Loshnitsa rural council =

Loshnitsa rural council (Belarusian: Лошніцкі сельсавет; Russian: Лошницкий сельсовет) is a lower-level subdivision (selsoviet) of Byerazino district, Minsk region, Belarus. Its administrative center is Loshnitsa.
