= Loshnitsa =

Agrotown in Minsk Region, Belarus

Loshnitsa Лошніца (Belarusian) Лошница (Russian)
- Agrotown
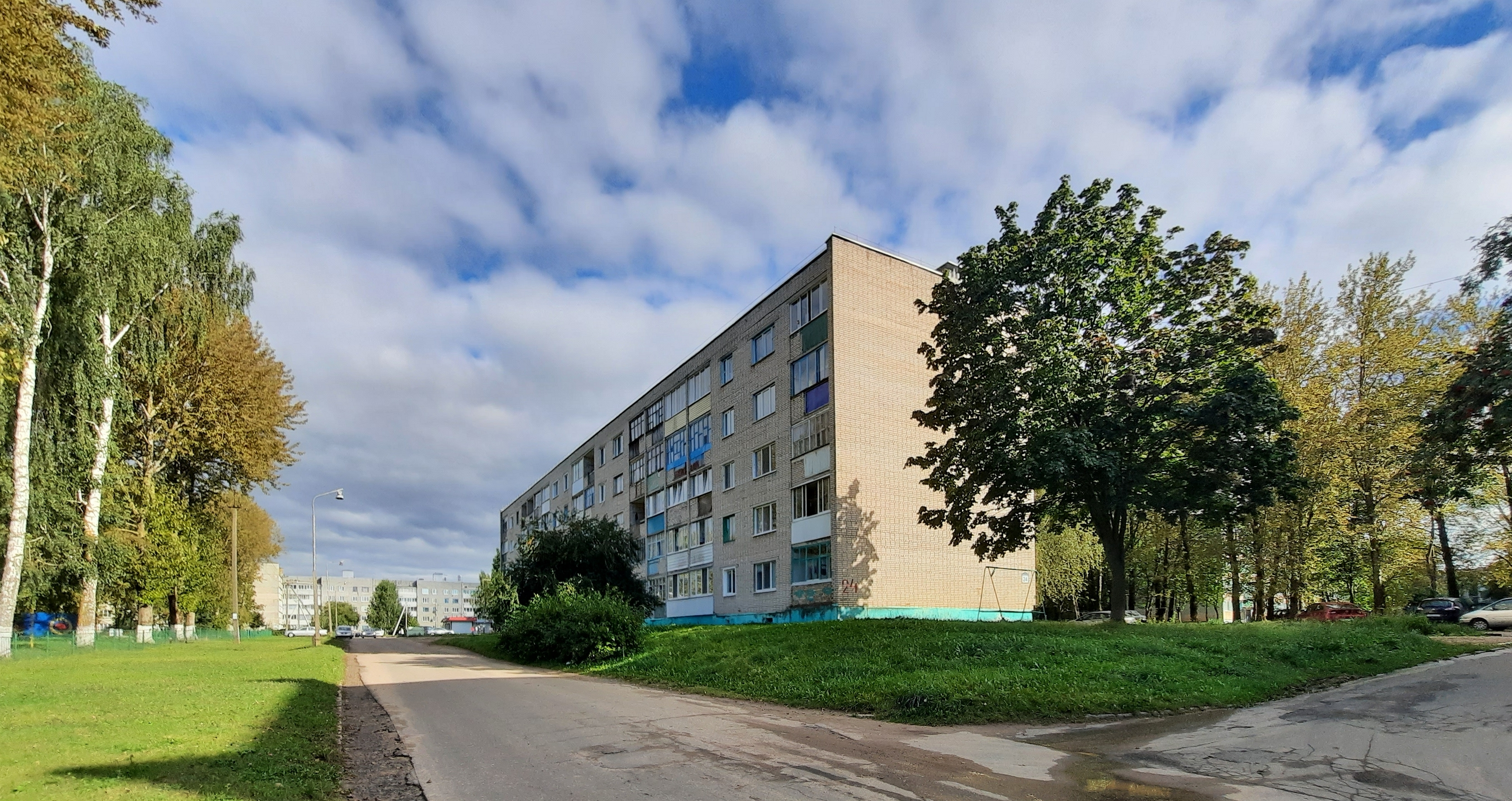

- Location within Belarus
- Coordinates: 54°16′34″N 28°45′48″E
- Country: Belarus
- Region: Minsk Region
- District: Barysaw District
- First mentioned: 1563
- Time zone: UTC+3 (MSK)

Loshnitsa (Belarusian: Лошніца, romanized: Lošnica; Russian: Лошница) is an agrotown in Barysaw District, Minsk Region, Belarus. It serves as the administrative center of Loshnitsa rural council. It is located 20 kilometres (12 mi) east from Barysaw and 96 kilometres (60 mi) from Minsk.

== History ==
The settlement was first mentioned in 1563 as part of Barysaw starost in Vitebsk Voivodeship of the Grand Duchy of Lithuania. In 1793, it was part of the territories annexed by the Russian Empire.

During the French invasion of Russia in 1812, the French army led by Nicolas Oudinot captured the settlement at the Battle of Loschniza on 23 November.

== Bibliography ==
- Bianko, U. U. (1999). Беларуская энцыклапедыя: У 18 т. Т. 9: Кулібін — Малаіта. Minsk: Беларуская энцыклапедыя. pp. 352–353. ISBN 985-11-0155-9.
