= Battle of Swolna =

1812 battle during the French invasion of Russia

- Part of the French invasion of Russia
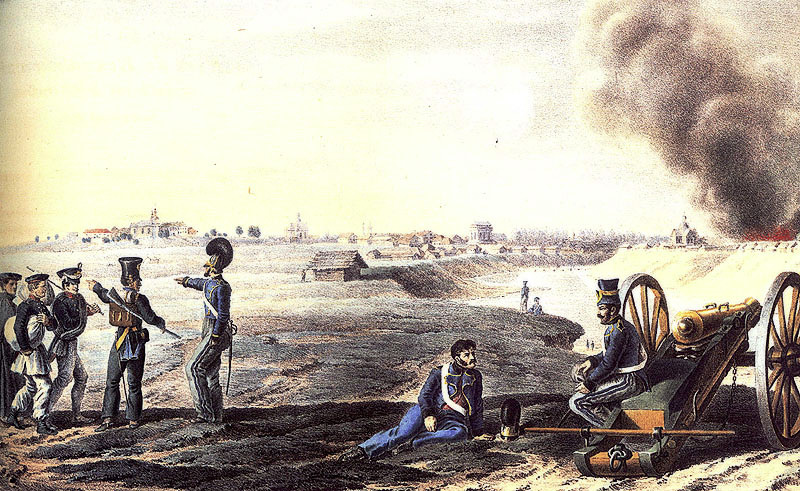
- Near Beshenkovichi, on the banks of the Western Dvina, Belarus. July 29, 1812. 1830s
Date	11 August 1812
Location	Svolna, Russian Empire (today Belarus) 55°43′0″N 28°2′0″E
Result	Inconclusive

Belligerents
Russian Empire	(First French Empire) French Empire

Commanders and leaders
(Russian Empire) Fyodor d'Auvray	(First French Empire) Nicolas Oudinot

Strength
9,000; 21 cannon	10,000

Casualties and losses
700–800 dead or wounded	1,200 dead or wounded 300 captured

French invasion of Russia
current battle
Prussian corps
Napoleon
Austrian corps

The Battle of Swolna (Svolna) took place 11 August 1812 near the village of Svolna – during the French invasion of Russia – where Oudinot's French ran at the river Svolna into the Russians under d'Auvray (Dovre).

== Prelude ==
Napoleon had sent a Bavarian Corps to reinforce the troops of Oudinot. Although they were hit hard by dysentery Oudinot started a new offensive. Russian troops moved towards the village of Kokhanovichi, since d'Auvray decided that the lateral advance guard of the French was heading there, and his main forces were heading towards the city of Sebezh. In fact, the French are into this for a while they was moving towards Osveya, across from the Russian 1st Separate Infantry Corps. On August 10, Oudinot's troops advanced to the Svolnyapekh River, the forward detachments occupied the village of Kokhanovichi, the Swolna manor and the village of Ostry Konets (several kilometers upstream the Swolna River), where there were bridges across the Swolna River.

== Battle ==
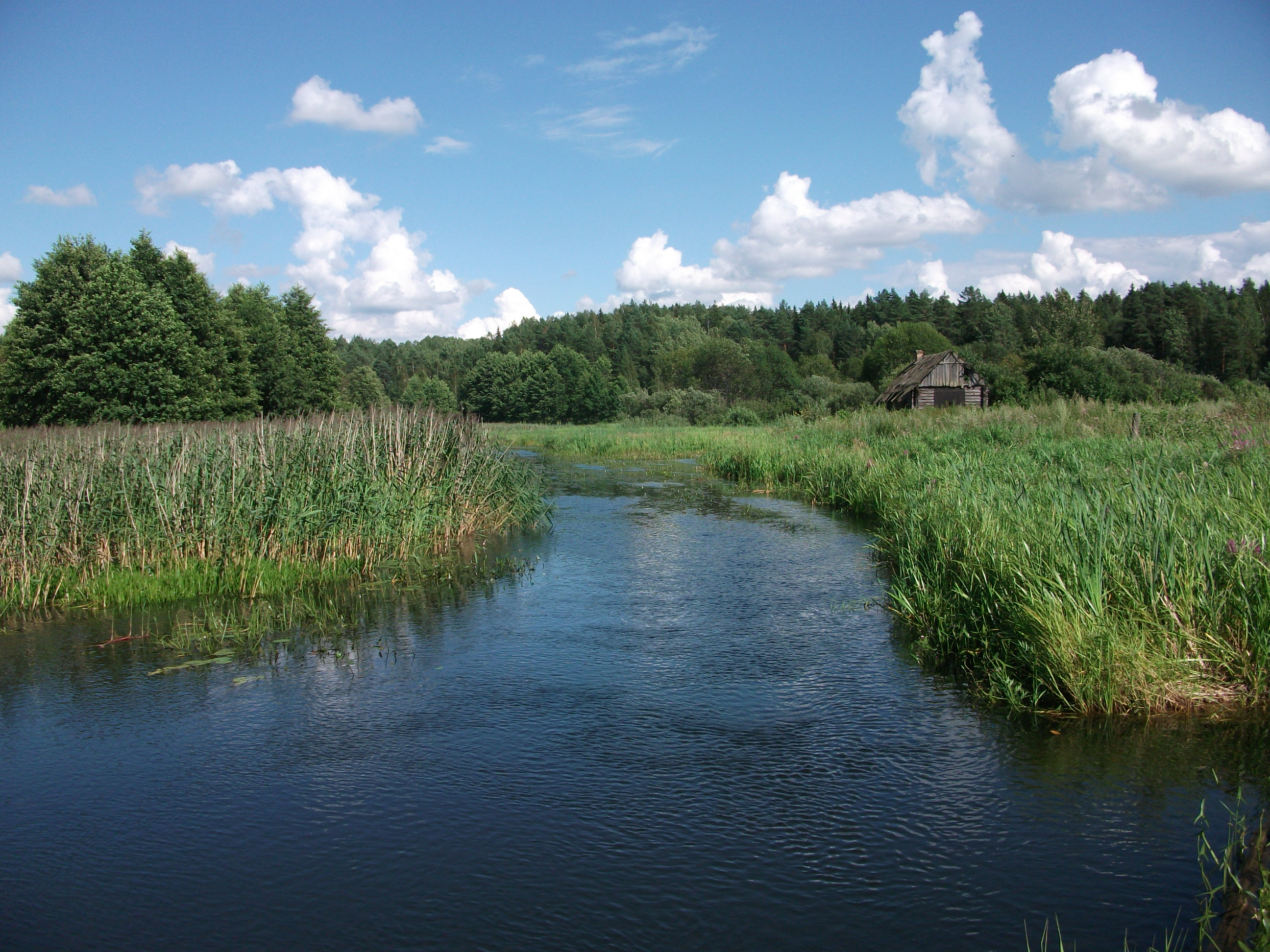
Svolna river near Valyasy village (Belarus)

On August 11, the armies of Oudinot and a Russian army under the command of Fyodor d'Auvray engaged in Swolna. Although neither side was able to enforce the crossing of the Swolna, the French forces suffered around 1,500 casualties, and the Russian forces suffered around 750 casualties. There was no clear victor of the battle.

== Aftermath ==
Oudinot retreated behind the Drissa.

== See also ==
- List of battles of the French invasion of Russia
