= Battle of Klyastitsy =

1812 battle during the French invasion of Russia

- Part of the French invasion of Russia
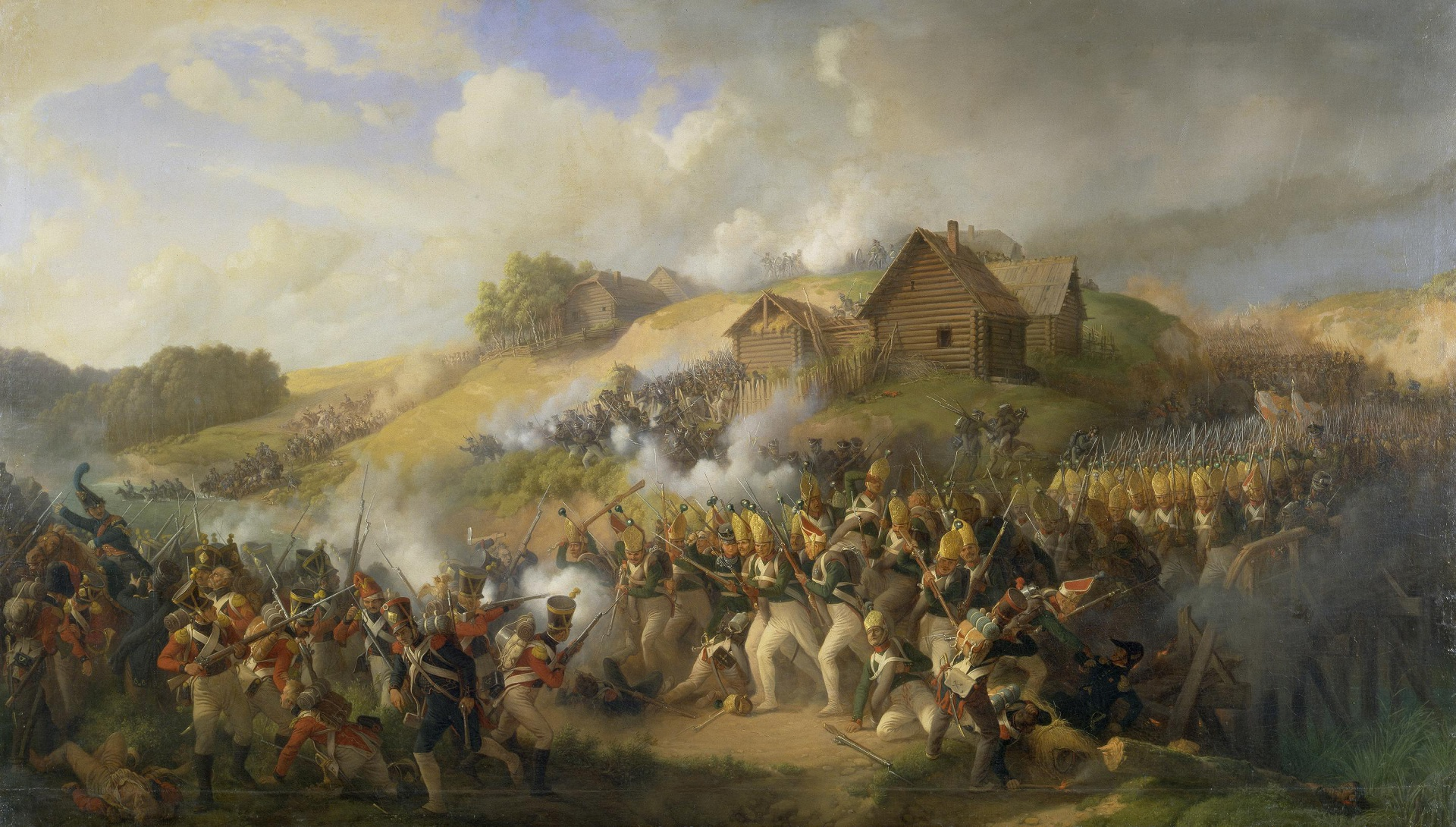
- Battle of Klyastitsy by Peter von Hess
Date	30 July – 1 August 1812
Location	Klyastitsy, Vitebsk Governorate, Russian Empire 55°53′N 28°36′E
Result	Russian victory

Belligerents
Russian Empire	(First French Empire) French Empire

Commanders and leaders
(Russian Empire) Peter Wittgenstein (WIA) (Russian Empire) Yakov Kulnev †	(First French Empire) Nicolas Oudinot

Strength
17,000 (30–31 July); 23,000 in total 108 guns	20,000 engaged 28,000 overall 114 guns (possibly 92 guns involved)

Casualties and losses
4,300, 9 guns	3,700; French POWs claim: up to 10,000 killed and wounded, 3,000+ captured

French invasion of Russia
current battle
Prussian corps
Napoleon
Austrian corps

The Battle of Klyastitsy, also called the Battle of Yakubovo or the Battle of Oboyarshchina, was a series of military engagements that took place on 30 July [O.S. 18 July] 1812 – 1 August [O.S. 20 July] 1812 near the village of Klyastitsy on the road between Polotsk and Sebezh. In this battle, the Russian vanguard under the command of General Yakov Kulnev and the whole corps of General Peter Wittgenstein stood up to the French corps under the command of Marshal Nicolas Oudinot with heavy losses on both sides. The result was a Russian victory, their forces managing to capture the disputed village of Klyastitsy. The main strategic outcome of the battle was that the French offensive on St. Petersburg, then Russian capital, was stopped. The French partially retreated along their communication lines after the battle, and fended off Russian pursuers. Both Wittgenstein and Kulnev were wounded in this battle; however, for Kulnev the injury was fatal.

== The battle ==
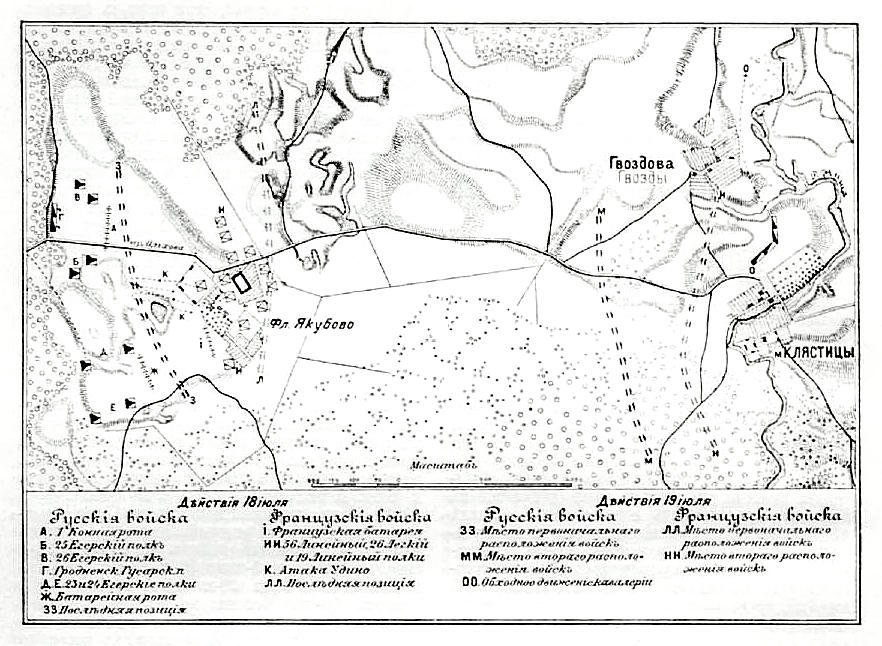
Plan of battles near Klyastitsy

Already on 28 July 1812, French cavalry squadrons of Gen. Jean Corbineau's side detachment were surprised and attacked by eight Russian Hussar and Cossack squadrons of generals Yakov Kulnev and Mikhail Balk's vanguard. During this action the French lost 167 only captured.

Upon arrival in Klyastitsy, Oudinot received the following order from Napoleon:

Pursue Wittgenstein on his heels, leaving a small force in Polotsk, in case he has rushed to the left. Upon my arrival in Vitebsk, I will send a corps to Nevel, which must establish communication with you. When you move from Polotsk to Sebezh, Wittgenstein will probably retreat to cover the Petersburg road; he has no more than 10,000 men, and you can go at him boldly.

Oudinot occupied the village of Klyastitsy on his advance towards St. Petersburg. There were 28,000 French troops, while the Russian Corps numbered 17,000. In spite of being outnumbered, Wittgenstein decided to fight. The battle started on 30 July at 2:00 pm. The Russian vanguard led by Kulnev (approximately 4,000 men) fought the French vanguard in the face of Claude Legrand's infantry division for the whole day near the village of Yakubovo (Russian: Якубóво). Kulnev's troops consisted of: Platov 4th Don Cossack Regiment, Rüdiger Grodno Hussar Regiment, Denisyev 25th and Roth 26th Jaeger regiments, and Sukhozanet Horse Artillery Company No. 1 with 12 guns. As soon as Wittgenstein heard of Kulnev's encounter with the French, that day (30 July) he sent to him 23rd and 24th jaeger Frolov regiments and Staden Artillery Company No. 14; accompanied by these units, Wittgenstein personally went to Kulnev. The remaining troops were ordered to speed up their movement. Kulnev managed to press the French with the help of reinforcement but they kept the village under their control and set it on fire before withdrawing.

The next day, the opponents concentrated the mass of their forces. The following formations were also at Oudinot's disposal: the infantry division of Jean-Antoine Verdier, the cuirassier division of Jean-Pierre Doumerc (from the 3rd Reserve Cavalry Corps) and the light cavalry brigade of Bertrand Castex. Wittgenstein's troops were deployed in the following order: on the right wing, 6 battalions (24th, 25th, and 28th Jaeger Regiments) with 14 artillery units (Company No. 5 and one platoon of Company No. 9); in the center, 6 battalions of the Sevsk, Kaluga, and 26th Jaeger Regiments; on the left wing, 12 artillery pieces (Light Company No. 27) and 4 battalions of the Perm and Mogilev regiments. The infantry was built in one line, in battalion columns. After several attacks and counterattacks, the Russian advance forced Oudinot to retreat to Klyastitsy. In order to continue their advance, the Russian troops had to cross the Nishcha River. Oudinot ordered his troops to set fire to the only bridge. While the Russian cavalry was wading across the Nishcha, the 2nd Battalion of the Pavlovsky Grenadier Regiment rushed the burning bridge. This was depicted by Peter von Hess in his painting attached to the lead paragraph.

Kulnev continued to chase the French Corps with several cavalry regiments and one infantry battalion. After crossing the Drissa River on 1 August, his unit ran into an ambush at Oboyarshchina and suffered heavy casualties from French artillery. Kulnev was badly wounded (he had both his legs severed by a cannonball) and died that same day. Verdier's division formed a van and pressed back the injured general's soldiers, but Wittgenstein has finalised the victory by throwing his full force at Verdier near Golovchitsy. Wittgenstein was wounded in this affair. Oudinot retreated to Polotsk as he assumed Wittgenstein's force was more superior; the French advance on St. Petersburg failed.

== Aftermath ==
Wittgenstein was awarded the Order of St. George of the Second Degree. Alexander I is reported to have called him "the savior of St. Petersburg". Capt. Krylov, whose unit was the first to cross the river over the burning bridge, received the Order of St. George of the Fourth Degree.

== See also ==
- List of battles of the French invasion of Russia

== Sources ==
- Bodart, Gaston (1908). Militär-historisches Kriegs-Lexikon (1618-1905).
- Riehn, Richard K. (1990). 1812 : Napoleon's Russian campaign. McGraw-Hill. ISBN 9780070527317.
- Smith, Digby (1998). The Greenhill Napoleonic Wars Data Book. London: Greenhill Books.
- Velichko, Konstantin; Novitsky, Vasily; Schwarz, Alexey von; Apushkin, Vladimir; Schoultz, Gustav von (1913). Sytin Military Encyclopedia (in Russian). Vol. 12: Кальяри – Коалиционные войны. Типография Т-ва И. Д. Сытина. pp. 602–605.
- Korobkov, N. (1947). Из боевого прошлого русской армии. Moscow: Voenizdat. pp. 133–136.
- Егоршина, Петрова (2023). История русской армии [The history of the Russian Army] (in Russian). Moscow: Edition of the Russian Imperial Library. ISBN 978-5-699-42397-2.

Preceded by Battle of Kobrin	Napoleonic Wars; Battle of Klyastitsy	Succeeded by Battle of Majadahonda
