= Klyastsitsy =

Agrotown in Vitebsk Region, Belarus

Klyastsitsy Клясціцы (Belarusian) Клястицы (Russian)
- Agrotown
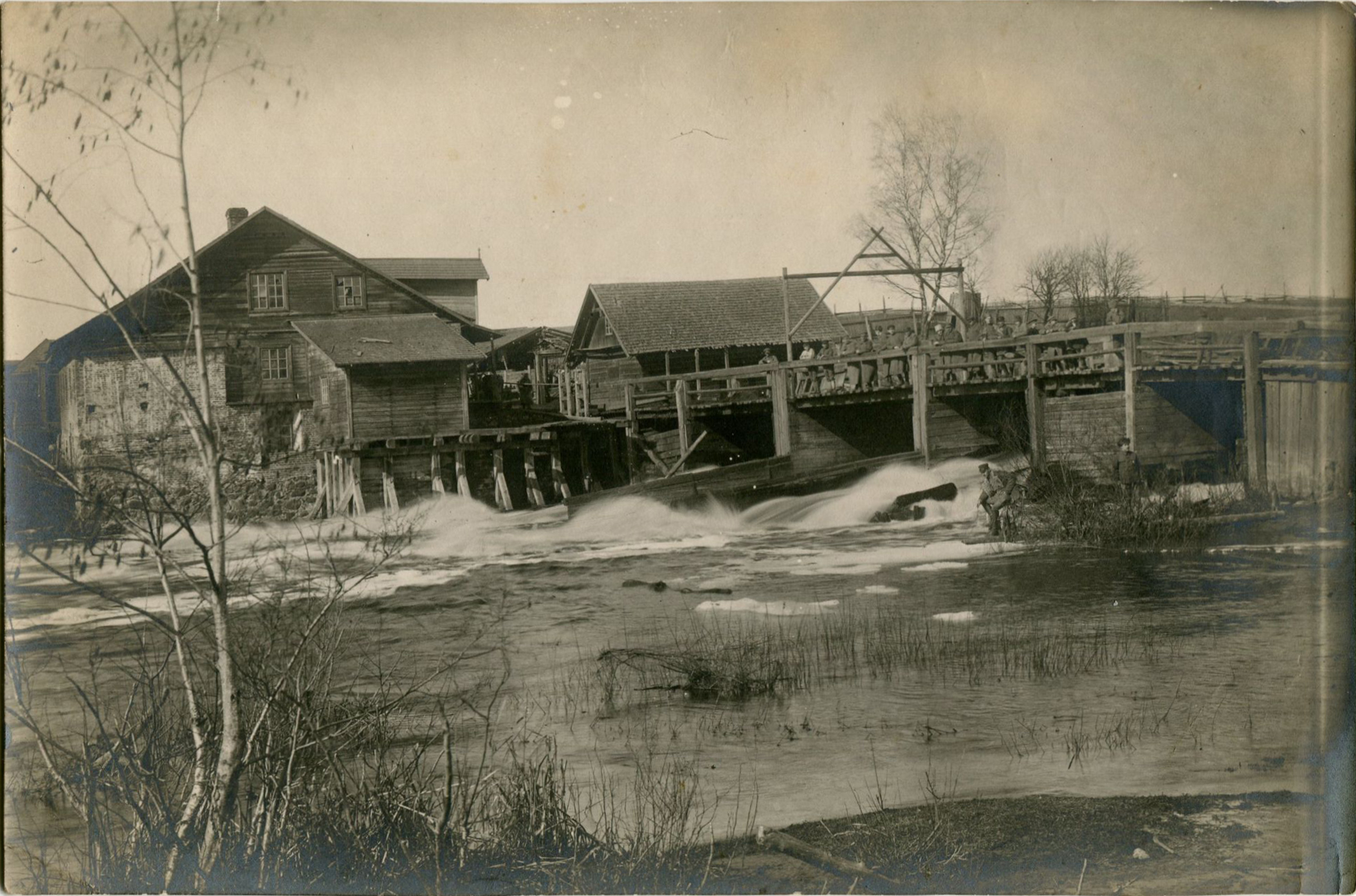

- Location within Belarus
- Coordinates: 55°53′16″N 28°35′59″E
- Country: Belarus
- Region: Vitebsk Region
- District: Rasony District
- Time zone: UTC+3 (MSK)

Klyastsitsy (Belarusian: Клясціцы, romanized: Kliascicy; Russian: Клястицы, romanized: Klyastitsy) is an agrotown in Rasony District, Vitebsk Region, Belarus. It serves as the administrative center of Klyastsitsy selsoviet.

== History ==
During the French invasion of Russia in 1812, Russian troops led by Yakov Kulnev defeated French forces at the Battle of Klyastitsy.
