= Aleksei Shcherbatov =

Russian general (1776–1848)

- Алексей Щербатов
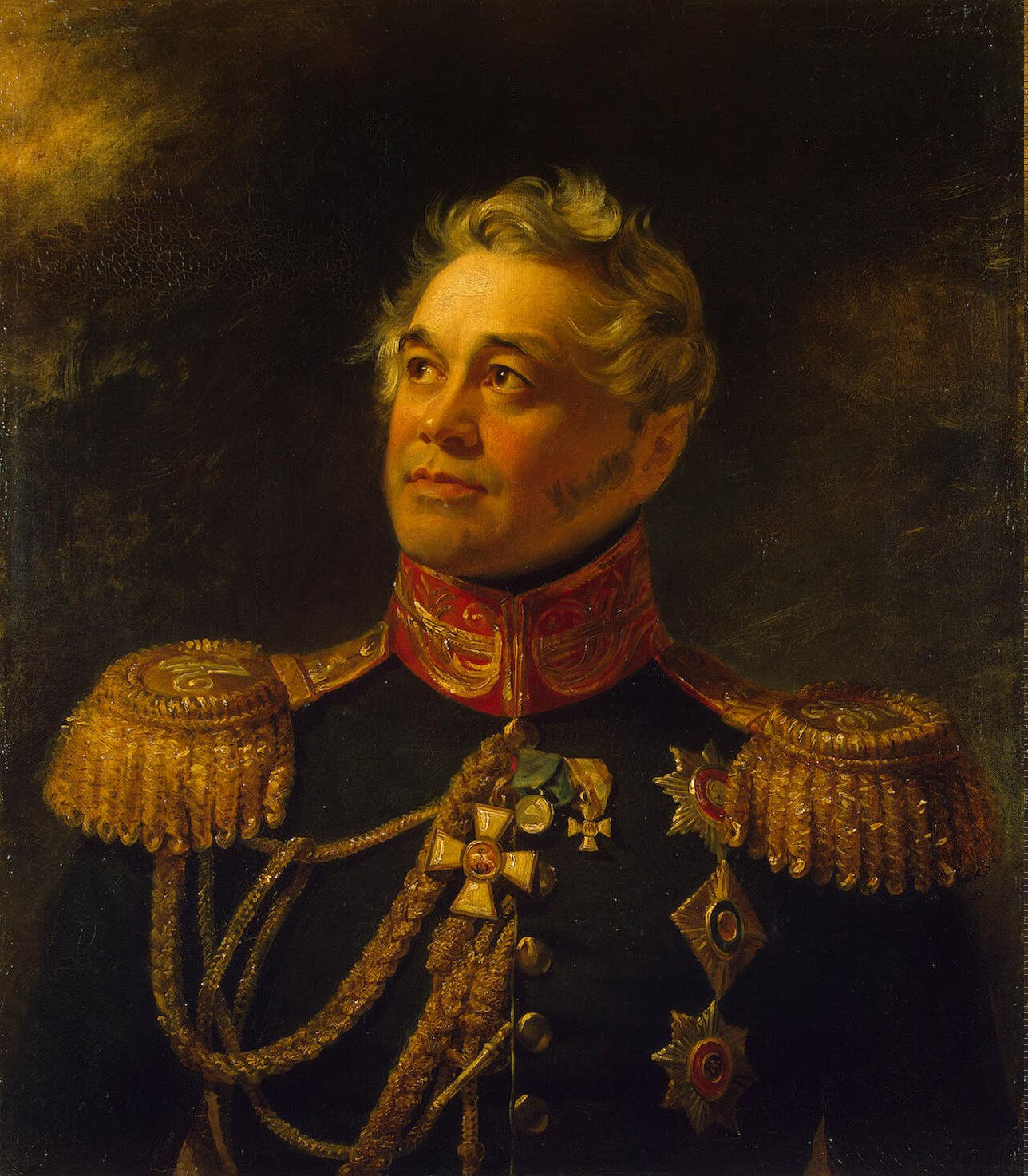
- Portrait by George Dawe, 1820–1825
- Born: 23 February 1776
- Died: 15 December 1848 (aged 72)
- Burial place: Donskoy Monastery, Moscow
- Military career
- Allegiance: Russia
- Service years: 1792–1848
- Rank: General of Infantry; Adjutant General
- Conflicts: Polish–Russian War of 1792; Russo-Turkish War (1806–12); War of the Fourth Coalition; November Uprising

Prince Aleksei Grigorievich Shcherbatov (Russian: Алексе́й Григо́рьевич Щерба́тов; 1776–1848) was a Russian general of the infantry, who showed himself during the Napoleonic Wars and November Uprising. Born into a noble family, he served as Mayor of Moscow for the final five years of his life.

== Sources ==
- "Щербатовы" . Brockhaus and Efron Encyclopedic Dictionary (in Russian). 1906.

Preceded by Dmitry Vladimirovich Golitsyn	Military Governor of Moscow Governorate; 1843 – 1848	Succeeded by Arseny Andreyevich Zakrevsky
