= Nicolas Oudinot =

French Army marshal (1767–1847)

Marshal of the Empire Nicolas Charles Oudinot Count of the Empire, Duke of Reggio
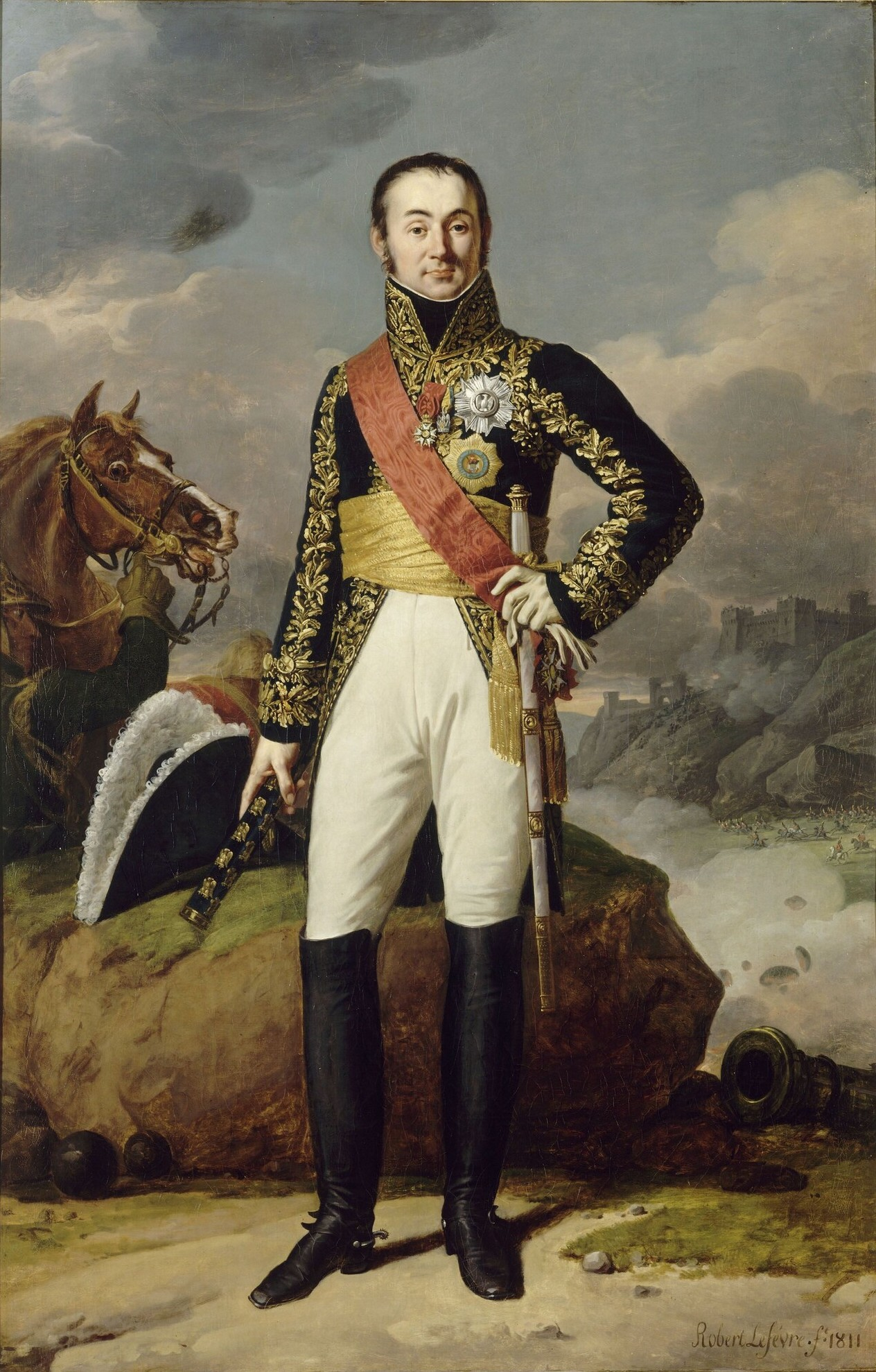
- Oudinot by Robert Lefèvre, 1811
- Born: 25 April 1767; Bar-le-Duc, France
- Died: 13 September 1847 (aged 80); Paris, France
- Spouses: Charlotte Derlin (m. 1789; death 1810) Eugenie de Coucy (m. 1812)
- Children: 11, including Charles
- Military career
- Allegiance: France
- Branch: Army
- Rank: Marshal of the Empire
- Known for: Military officer
- Conflicts: See battles: French Revolutionary Wars; War of the First Coalition; Battle of Kaiserslautern; War of the Second Coalition; First Battle of Feldkirch; Italian and Swiss expedition of 1799; Second Battle of Zurich; Siege of Genoa (1800); Battle of Monzambano; Napoleonic Wars; War of the Third Coalition; Battle of Schöngrabern; Battle of Austerlitz; War of the Fourth Coalition; Battle of Ostrołęka; Battle of Friedland; War of the Fifth Coalition; Battle of Wagram; French invasion of Russia; Battle of Klyastitsy; Battle of Swolna; First Battle of Polotsk; Battle of Loschniza; Battle of Berezina; War of the Sixth Coalition; Battle of Lützen; Battle of Bautzen; Battle of Luckau; Battle of Großbeeren; Battle of Leipzig; Hundred Thousand Sons of Saint Louis
- Awards: Grand Cross of the Legion of Honour
- Other work: Governor of Les Invalides (1842–1847)

Nicolas Charles Oudinot, duc de Reggio (English: /uːdiːˈnoʊ/ oo-dee-NOH, French: [nikɔla ʃaʁl udino]; 25 April 1767 – 13 September 1847) was a French general of the French Revolutionary Wars and the Napoleonic Wars. He is known to have been wounded 34 times in battle, being hit by artillery shells, sabres, and at least twelve bullets over the course of his military career. A Marshal of the Empire, he is best known for his contributions to the Napoleonic Wars with his famous grenadier division. Oudinot is one of the Names inscribed on the Arc de Triomphe, Eastern pillar Columns 13, 14.

== Early life ==
Nicolas Charles Oudinot was the son of Nicolas Oudinot and Marie Anne Adam, the only one of their nine children to live to adulthood. His father was a brewer, farmer and distiller of brandy in Bar-le-Duc, Lorraine. He decided upon a military career, and served in the regiment of Medoc from 1784 to 1787, when, having no hope of promotion on account of his non-noble birth, he retired with the rank of sergeant.

== French Revolutionary Wars ==
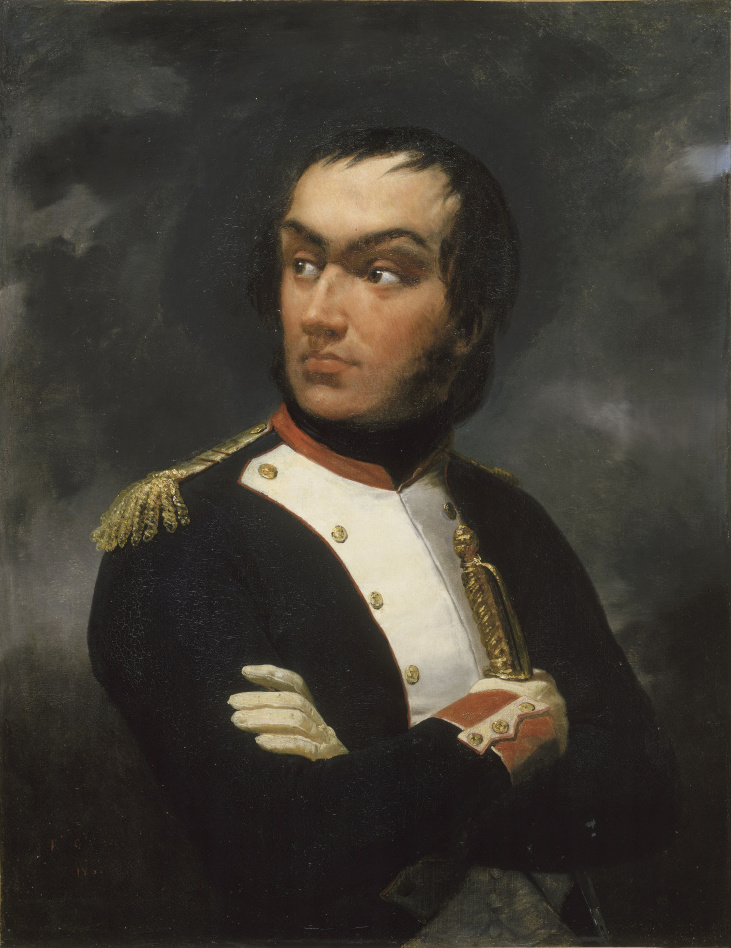
Oudinot as a lieutenant colonel of the 3rd battalion of the volunteers of the Meuse, 1792

The French Revolution changed his fortunes, and in 1792, on the outbreak of war, he was elected lieutenant-colonel of the 3rd battalion of the volunteers of the Meuse. His gallant defense of the little fort of Bitsch in the Vosges in 1792 drew attention to him; he was transferred to the regular army in November 1793, and after serving in numerous actions on the Belgian frontier he was promoted general of brigade, in June 1794 for his conduct at the Battle of Kaiserslautern.

He continued to serve with distinction on the German frontier under Louis Lazare Hoche, Charles Pichegru and Jean Victor Marie Moreau, was repeatedly wounded and once (in 1795) taken prisoner after having been wounded again. He was André Masséna's right hand all through the Swiss campaign of 1799, first as a general of division, then as chief of staff, and won extraordinary distinction at the Second Battle of Zurich. He was present under Massena at the Siege of Genoa, and so distinguished himself at the Battle of Monzambano that Napoleon presented him with a sword of honour (an especially uncommon award replaced later by the Légion d'Honneur). He was made inspector-general of infantry, and, on the establishment of the empire, given the Grand Cross of the Legion of Honour, but was not included in the first creation of marshals.

== Napoleonic Wars ==
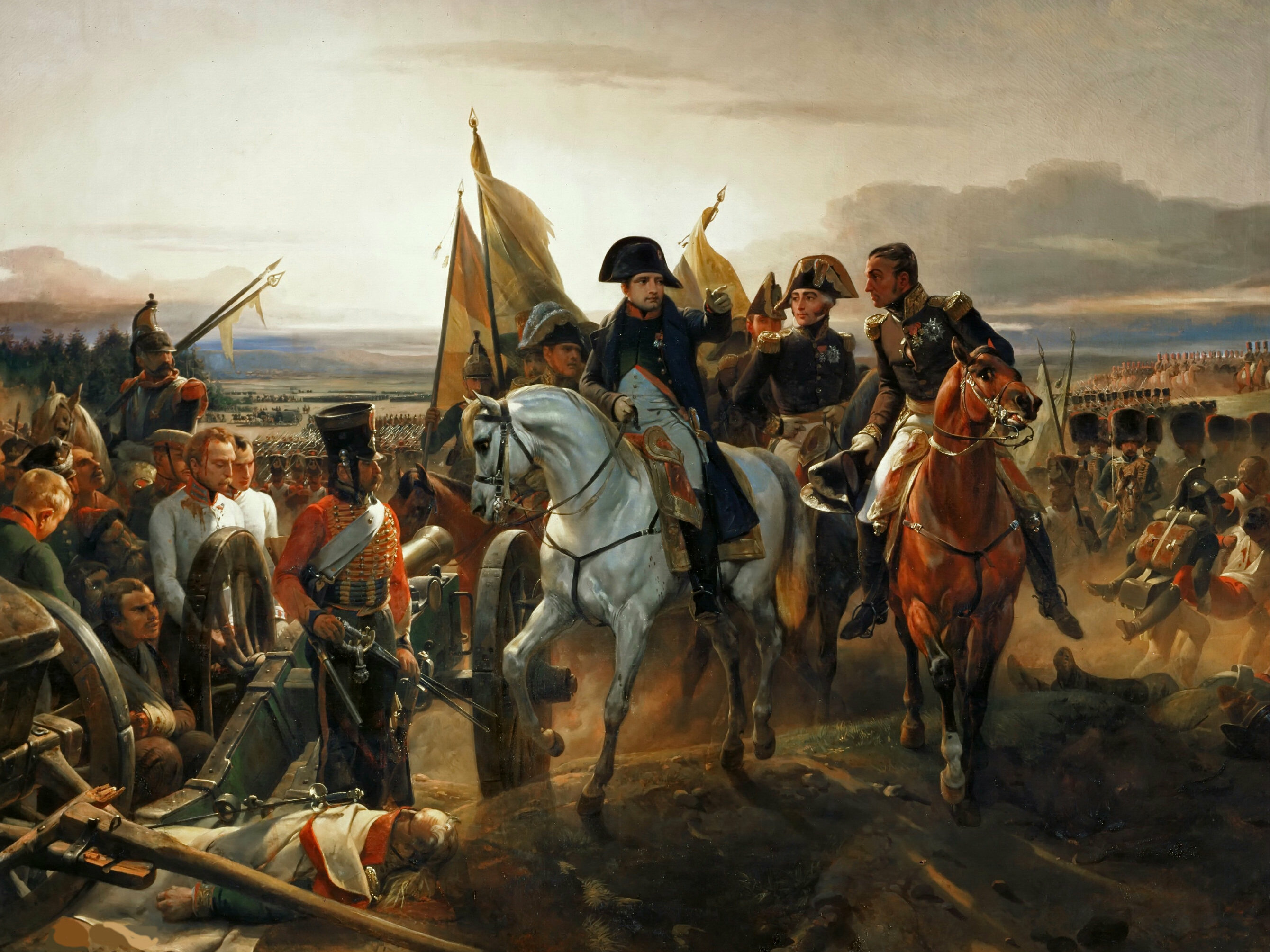
Napoleon giving instructions to Oudinot at Friedland

Oudinot was elected a member of the chamber of deputies, but had little time to devote to politics. He took a leading role in the War of the Third Coalition, commanding the famous division of "grenadiers Oudinot," made up of hand-picked troops and organised by him, with which he seized the Vienna bridges, received a wound at the Battle of Schöngrabern in Lower Austria against the Russians. In 1807, he participated in Joachim Murat's victory in the Battle of Ostrolenka in Poland and fought with resolution and success at the Battle of Friedland.

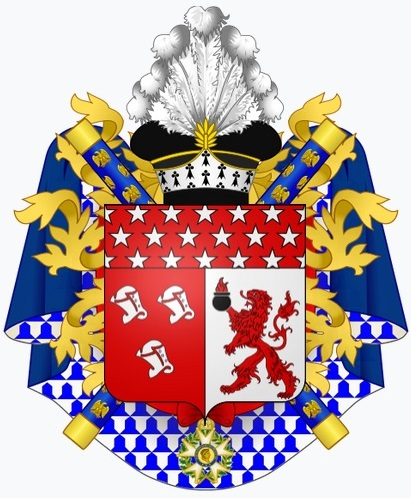
Heraldic achievement of Nicolas-Charles Oudinot as Duke of Reggio

In 1808 he was made governor of Erfurt and Count of the French Empire, and in 1809, after the Battle of Wagram, he was promoted to the rank of Marshal of France. He was made a titular duke in chief of the duché-grand fief of Reggio in the satellite Kingdom of Naples, and received a large money grant in April 1810.

From 1810 to 1812 Oudinot administered the government of the former Kingdom of Holland, and commanded the II Corps of La Grande Armée in the Russian campaign. His corps was instrumental in building the bridge over the Berezina that allowed the evacuation of troops after the defeat at the Battle of Berezina. During this period he suffered another wounding in battle.

He was present at the Battle of Lützen and the Battle of Bautzen, and when holding the independent command of the corps directed to take Berlin was defeated at the Battle of Grossbeeren. He was then superseded by Marshal Ney, but the latter was defeated at the Battle of Dennewitz.

Oudinot was not disgraced. He held important commands at the Battle of Leipzig and in the campaign of 1814. On Napoleon's abdication, he rallied to the new government, and was made a Peer of France by the Bourbon Restoration King Louis XVIII. Unlike many of his old comrades, he did not desert to his former master during Bonaparte's 1815 return.

== Later life ==
His last active service was in the French invasion of Spain in 1823, in which he commanded a corps and was for a time governor of Madrid. He died as Governor of the Parisian veterans institution Les Invalides.

== Honours ==
- 1849 : Knight Grand Cross in the Order of Pope Pius IX.

== Personal life ==
He married first, in September 1789, Charlotte Derlin (1768–1810) and had 7 children:

- Marie-Louise (1790–1832): wife (1808) of general Pierre Claude Pajol (1772–1844)
- Charles (1791–1863)
- Nicolette (1795–1865): wife (1811) of general Guillaume Latrille de Lorencez (1772–1855)
- Emilie (1796–1805)
- Auguste (1799–1835)
- Elise (1801–1882)
- Stephanie (1808–1893)

He married secondly, in January 1812, Eugenie de Coucy (1791–1868) and had 4 children:

- Louise-Marie (1816–1909)
- Caroline (1817–1896)
- Charles-Joseph (1819–1858)
- Henri (1822–1891)

== See also ==
- Charles Oudinot, the marshal's eldest son
