= Battle of Kobrin =

1812 battle during the French invasion of Russia

Battle of Kobrin (Kobryn)
- Part of the French invasion of Russia
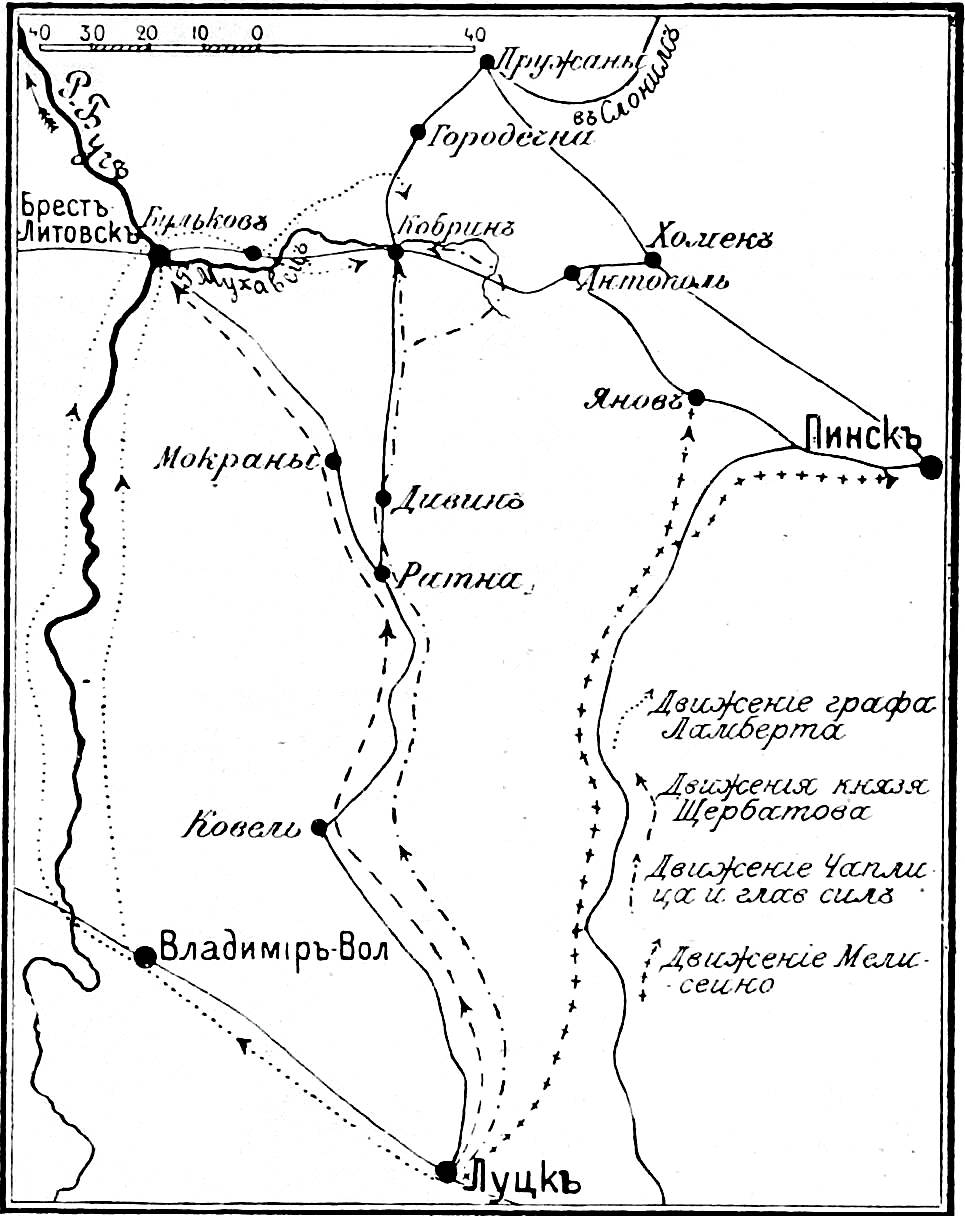
- Theater of military operations
| Date | 27 July 1812 |
| Location | Kobrin, Russian Empire; present-day Kobryn, Belarus 52°12′58″N 24°21′59″E |
| Result | Russian victory |

Belligerents
| Russian Empire | Kingdom of Saxony |

Commanders and leaders
| Alexander Tormasov; Karl Lambert | Jean Reynier; Heinrich von Klengel (surrendered) |

Units involved
| Third Reserve Army of Observation | VII Corps |

Strength
| 44,000; 12,000 participated, with 36 cannon (Note: Bodart states 33,000 and notes that Tormasov engaged 12,000.) | 15,000; 2,600 participated, with 8 cannon |

Casualties and losses
| 600 killed or wounded | 300 killed or wounded 2,300 captured 8 cannon & 4 standards |

French invasion of Russia
current battle
Prussian corps
Napoleon
Austrian corps

The Battle of Kobrin, or the Battle of Kobryn, took place on 27 July 1812 between the Russian and Saxon forces – under the command of Alexander Tormasov and Jean Reynier respectively – in the city of Kobrin (Kobryn) at the initial stage of the French invasion of Russia. The battle was a clear victory of the Russian forces. The incompetence on the part of Reynier was that he underestimated Tormasov's strength and overstretched his troops, leaving his entire brigade vulnerable to encirclement, which the Russian commander took advantage of.

== Background ==
On 24 June 1812 Napoleon invaded the Russian Empire on a broad front from Brest in the south to the Baltic sea in the north. The main French forces crossed the Neman near Napoleon's Hill (outside Kaunas) and acted against the 1st and 2nd Russian armies stationed there. 33,000-strong Austrian corps of Schwarzenberg crossed the Bug River in the south, who moved troops to Russian Empire due to alliance between Austrian Empire and Napoleon. Austria was compelled to participate in the French invasion of Russia as a French vassal, but gave its commander Schwarzenberg tacit instructions not to be zealous and not to move far from the borders.

Schwarzenberg was opposed by the 3rd Observational Army of Russian General of the Cavalry Tormasov, whose strength varies greatly in different documents. Historians count that Tormasov's army had 45,000 men, Clausewitz determines its number at 35,000 men, and Prince Vyazemsky (commander of the 15th Division as part of the Third Army) in his notes mentions about 25,000 combatants in the Third Army, 160 guns and garrisons placed in territories of modern-day Belarus and the north-west Ukraine, which probably also belonged to the Third Army. The Observational Army guarded the borders of the Russian Empire from Austria and the Duchy of Warsaw in modern territories of the south of Belarus and the north-west of Ukraine.

With the outbreak of the war, the Austrians covered the right flank of Napoleon from the Russian Third Army, stationing the border garrisons along Brest–Kobryn–Pinsk line with a length of 170 kilometres (110 mi).

Initially, the case was limited to maneuvers, the Russians and Austrians watched each other without entering into fights. On 17 July, Tormasov received orders from War Minister Barclay de Tolly to act on the right flank of the French army, wedged into Russian territory by a deep wedge.

The order successfully coincided with the rearrangement of troops in the enemy camp. Napoleon recalled the Austrians to the main direction, instead of them sending the Reynier's 7th Saxon corps (17,000 men). Napoleon mistakenly underestimated the strength of the Third Army, believing that the corps of Reynier could hold back the Russians before Chichagov's Danube Army will arrive to Tormasov from Moldova. The original plan of Napoleon meant a lightning campaign. It was planned to destroy the Western Russian armies in a general battle and force the tsar to ask for peace.

Tormasov attacked at a time when the Austrians had withdrawn their troops, and the Saxons had not yet taken a fully defensive line. According to the plan, the first goal was to capture Brest, and then Kobryn.

== Tormasov's offensive plan ==
Tormasov selected 5 cavalry regiments (mostly dragoons) to protect the borders of Russian Empire from the Duchy of Warsaw, that was allied to Napoleon. Then he pulled the available forces to Kovel, dividing the army into 5 parts:

- The detachment of Lieutenant General Sacken covered the rear, staying in Lutsk.
- The main forces (3 cavalry and 11 infantry regiments) under the command of Tormasov moved to Kobryn along the southern road.
- The detachment of Major General Lambert, consisting of two Jaegers and two cavalry regiments, was sent to Brest.
- The detachment of Major General Scherbatov, consisting of two cavalry regiments, was sent to Brest from another direction. Lambert and Scherbatov's detachments after the occupation of Brest had to attack Kobryn from the west.
- The detachment of Major General Melissino (1 cavalry regiment and about an infantry battalion) was sent to Pinsk to demonstrate activity and to deceive Reynier about Tormasov's intentions.

On 24 July, General Scherbatov occupied Brest, knocking out 2 enemy squadrons from the corps of Reynier. At the same time General Melissino on 25 July beat out group of Saxons from Pinsk in 170 kilometers from Brest. Reynier with the main forces was near Yanov, approximately in the middle between Kobryn and Pinsk, in a condition of some confusion, unable to determine the direction of the main blow of the Russians and their strength.

On 27 July, the main Russian forces (up to 18,000 soldiers, 130 guns) approached Kobryn. Tormasov came from the south, and the detachments of Lambert and Scherbatov came from the west. Kobryn was a small town with a population of about 2 thousand inhabitants in the south-west of modern Belarus, on the Mukhavets River (an eastern tributary of the Bug River).

== Battle ==
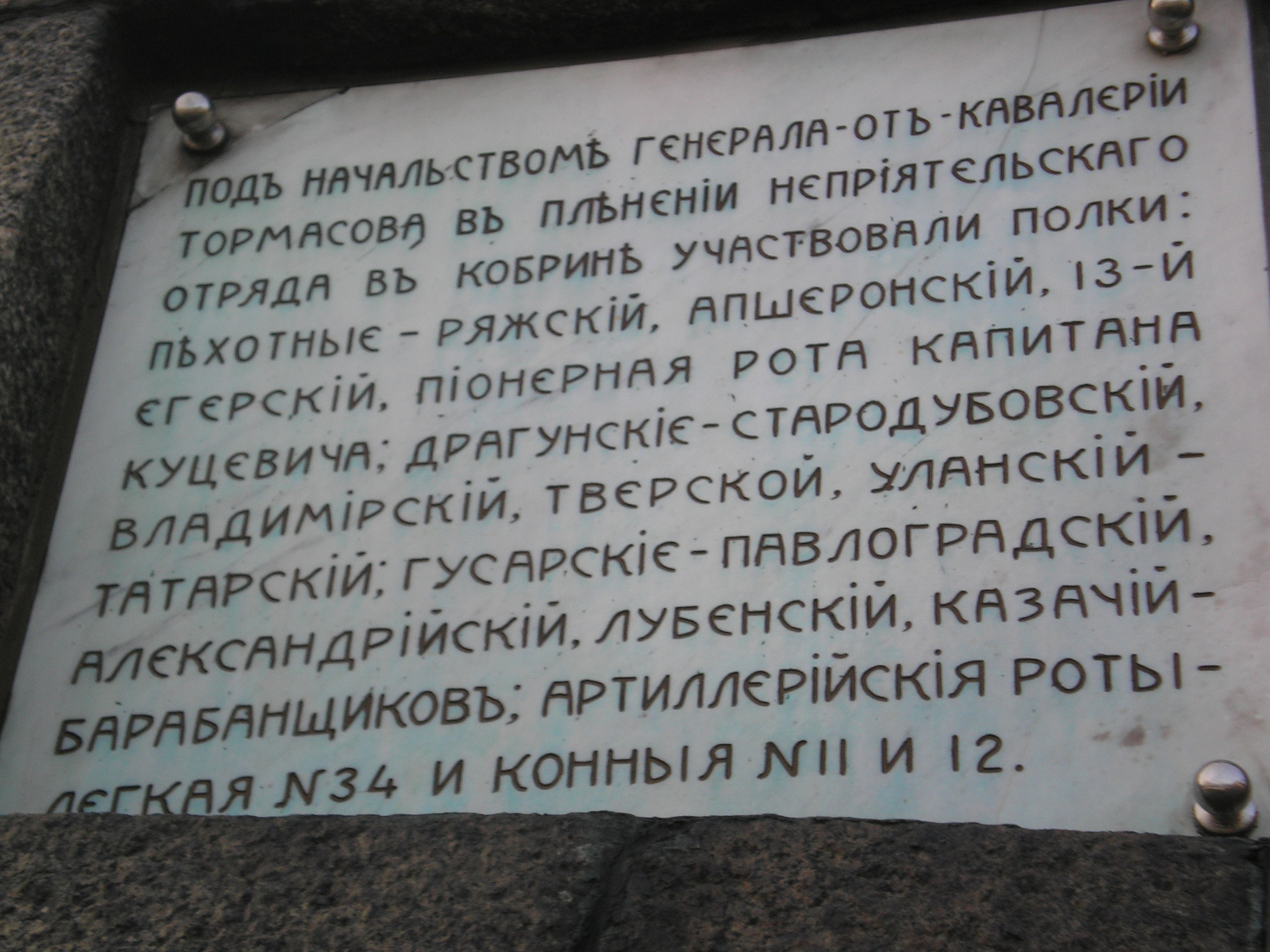
Memorial plaque on the monument of the victory of Russian troops in Kobryn

Kobryn was occupied by a 5,000-strong Saxon brigade commanded by Major General Klengel from the 22nd Infantry Division of the Reynier corps. Saxons expected Russians from Brest and took a position 2 kilometres (1.2 mi) from the city, placing the cavalry on the road, and the riflemen along the road. From the south, Saxons settled in the manor houses on the outskirts, blocking the entrance to the Tormasov's vanguard.

Lambert in the west early in the morning attacked the enemy with the forces of irregular cavalry, trying to entice the Saxons into the open field. Tormasov ordered General Chaplits to bypass Kobryn from the east with the vanguard, leaving a little cavalry to block the soldiers of Klengel, who had settled in the buildings on the southern outskirts. Lambert managed to bring down the Saxons' cover from the road, but they were entrenched in urban buildings, barring the way to the city from the west. When Chaplits broke with the 13th Jaeger Regiment in Kobryn from the east, Lambert sent two regiments of irregular cavalry to the northern road to the Pruzhany to cut off the Saxons' escape routes. Thus the brigade of Klengel was completely surrounded. The Saxons tried to bring down the Russian cover from the road to the Pruzhany, but were pushed back to Kobryn.

Meanwhile, at 9 o'clock in the morning, the main forces of the Russians came to Kobryn. Tormasov sent two more infantry regiments to Kobryn, the remaining regiments surrounded the town with a dense ring. In the town of wooden buildings Saxons had nowhere to gain a foothold. The Russian artillery easily shot any position, the city burned. Out of 630 city buildings, only 79 survived after the battle. Prince Vyazemsky wrote the impressions of the battle in the diary the next day:

All in flame, wives, girls in only shirts, children, all fleeing and seeking salvation; the battle in the fire, the rapid movement of troops, scattered enemy transporters, roaring and running cattle through the field, the dust eclipsed the sun, horror everywhere.

By noon the battle was over, the surviving Saxons led by General Klengel were driven into the half-ruined Kobryn castles (part of the gift of Catherine II to count Alexander Suvorov) and surrendered.

== Aftermath ==
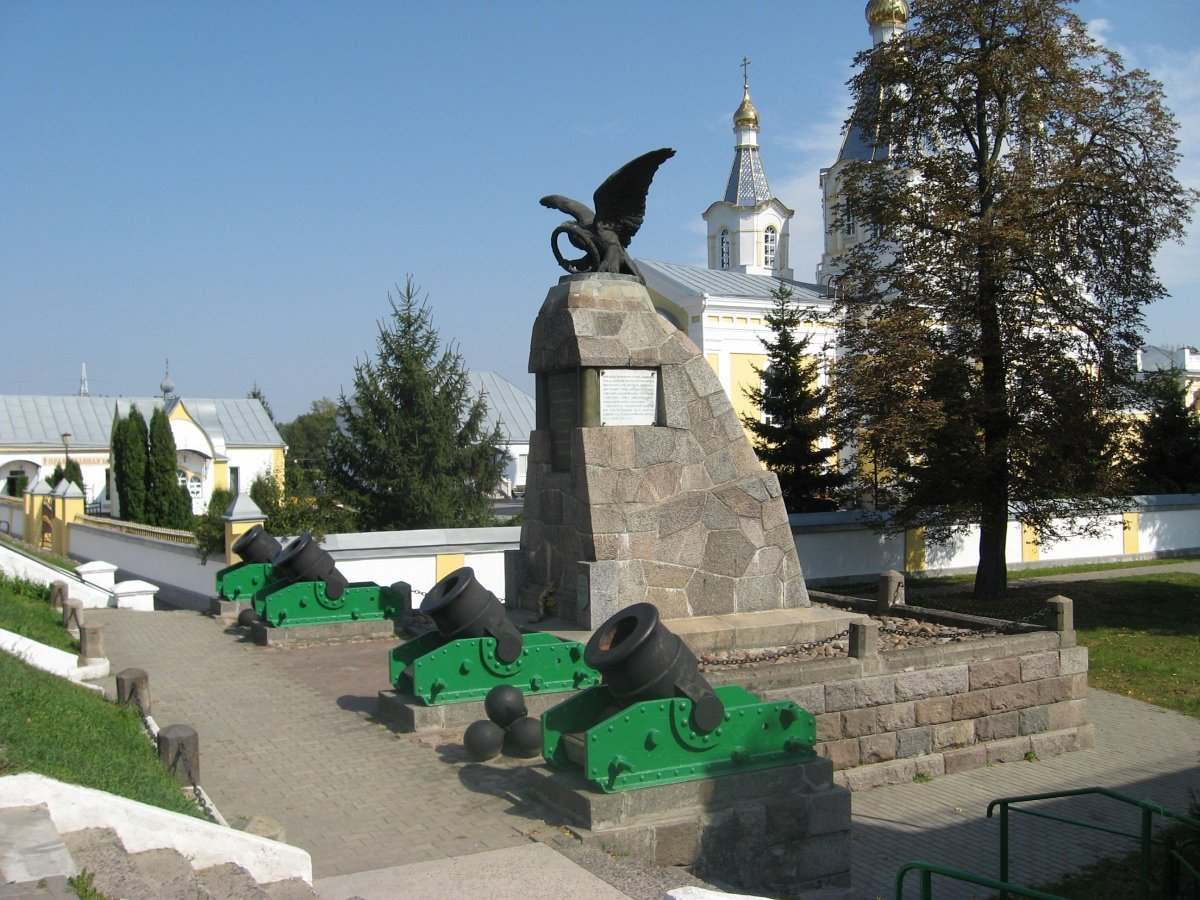
Monument to victory near Kobryn

According to the report of Tormasov, up to 2,000 Saxons were killed, 2 generals were captured, including Klengel himself, 76 officers and 2,382 lower ranks, 2 battalion banners, 2 standards and 8 guns were captured. The losses of the Russian army amounted to 77 people killed and 181 wounded.

The Russian Tsar generously noted the first major victory in the French invasion of Russia. Tormasov received the Order of St. George of the 2nd degree and 50 thousand rubles, count Lambert received a golden sword with the inscription "For Bravery", decorated with diamonds. Also the Order of St. George of the 4th degree was awarded to the commander of the 13th Jaeger Regiment, Major Izbashi.

On the day of the defeat of the Saxon brigade in Kobryn in the main direction, the 1st Russian army retreated from Napoleon forces to Smolensk after heavy rearguard battles near Vitebsk.

Reynier did not reach 25 kilometres (16 mi) to Kobryn. Upon learning of the defeat of his brigade, he began to retreat north to Slonim, pursued by the detachments of Tormasov. Schwarzenberg with the consent of Napoleon turned to the help the 7th Corps of Reynier. Thus Tormasov's army pulled on itself a powerful Schwarzenberg's forces, weakened the French troops in the Moscow direction.

On 12 August the combined forces of Schwarzenberg and Reynier attacked under Gorodechno (slightly north of Kobryn) Tormasov's forces estimated by Prince Vyazemsky of 16,000 soldiers. The Russians lost up to 1,200 soldiers and by September retreated south to Lutsk, fortifying themselves on the eastern bank of the Styr River.

With the approach in mid-September 1812 of the Chichagov's Danube army Tormasov gained superiority over the Schwarzenberg and on 23 September went on the offensive.

== See also ==
- List of battles of the French invasion of Russia

== Notes ==
| Preceded by Battle of Vitebsk (1812) | Napoleonic Wars; Battle of Kobrin | Succeeded by Battle of Klyastitsy |
