= 1812 in Russia =

- Decades: 1790s; 1800s; 1810s; 1820s; 1830s
- See also: History of Russia; Timeline of Russian history; List of years in Russia

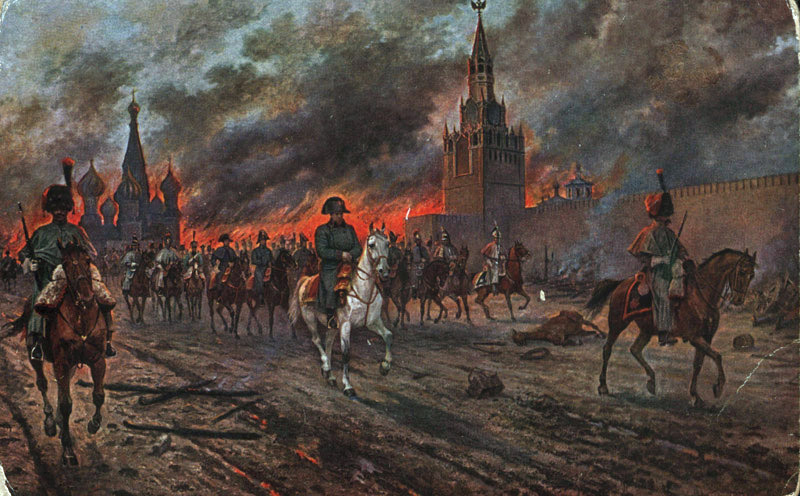
Napoleon retreating from the burning Moscow

This article lists notable events that occurred in 1812 of Russia, including a timeline of the French invasion of Russia.

== Events ==
- Alexander I remains Monarch of Russia.
- March 14 - The Treaty of Paris is signed, establishing a reluctant alliance between the French Empire and the Austrian Empire to provide troops to fight against the Russian Empire.
  - June 24 - The French invasion of Russia begins, as Napoleon crosses the Nieman river.
  - August 16 - The Battle of Smolensk begins, marking the first major Battle of the French invasion of Russia.
  - August 18 - The Battle of Smolensk concludes in a French victory, with roughly 15,000 to 24,000 casualties.
  - September 5 - The Battle of Shevardino begins and ends in a day, resulting in a French victory.
  - September 7 - The Battle of Borodino also begins and ends in a day, in the outskirts of Moscow. This resulted in the Russian troops retreating, but with roughly equal losses on both sides.
  - September 14 - Moments before the French arrive at Moscow, Russian troops and civilians evacuate the city.
  - September 14 - The French army, led by Napoleon, take control of Moscow.
  - September 14 to 18 - Moscow is destroyed by a fire organized by Fyodor Rostopchin, the military governor at the time. This burns down most of the entire city, including Moscow University.
  - October 18 - The troops of Russian general Levin August von Bennigsen defeat Joachim Murat's french troops in the Battle of Tarutino.
  - October 18 - The Second Battle of Polotsk starts.
  - October 19 - Napoleon's forces abandon Moscow.
  - October 20 - The Second Battle of Polotsk concludes with a Russian victory.
  - October 24 - The Battle of Maloyaroslavets begins and ends in a day, resulting in a Russian victory.
  - November 15 to 18 - The Battle of Krasnoi begins and ends in a Russian victory.
  - November 26 to 29 - The Battle of Berezina begins and ends; as Napoleon and his army attempt to retreat to Poland to recover from the occupation of Moscow, they have to cross the Berezina river, leading to an attack from the Russian army.
  - December 24 - The French invasion of Russia concludes with a Russian victory, with an estimated 1 million total deaths.
- March 29 - Mikhail Speransky is dismissed from his office of State secretary due to his unpopular reform policies.
- May 28 - The Treaty of Bucharest is signed, establishing peace between the Ottoman Empire and the Russian Empire, following the Ottoman's defeat in multiple battles in eighth Russo-Turkish War. This also established the basis for future Russia–Turkey relations.
- December 29 - The Society of Patriotic Ladies, also known as the Patriotic Society, is founded in Saint Petersburg.

== Births ==
- Hasan bey Agalarov (d. ?), Azerbaijani general
- Gabriel Aivazovsky (d. 1879), Armenian archbishop, scholar, and historian
- Mirza Fatali Akhundov (d. 1878), Azerbaijani writer, playwright, philosopher, and literary critic
- Ambrose of Optina (d. 1891), monk, saint
- Ivane Bagration of Mukhrani (d. 1895), Georgian nobleman, general, and winemaker
- Vasily Botkin (d. 1869), essayist, critic, translator, and publicist
- Nino Chavchavadze (d. 1857), Georgian princess, wife of novelist Alexander Griboyedov
- Alexandre Dubuque (d. 1898), pianist, composer, and teacher of French descent
- Abdul Hamid Efendizadeh (d. 1880), fourth mufti of the Religious Council of the Caucasus
- Ivan Goncharov (d. 1891), novelist and government official
- Alexander Herzen (d. 1870), revolutionary
- Yevhen Hrebinka (d. 1848), Ukrainian poet, writer, and philanthropist
- Ahmad Huseinzadeh (d. 1887), third Sheikh ul-Islam of the Caucasus
- Hélene Kotchoubey (d. 1888), noblewoman and court official
- Otto Friedrich Theodor von Möller (d. 1874), Baltic German painter
- Vakhtang Orbeliani (d. 1890), Georgian poet and general
- Pimen Orlov (d. 1865), painter
- Ivan Panaev (d. 1862), writer, literary critic, journalist and magazine publisher
- Nikolai Pimenov (d. 1864), sculptor
- Natalia Pushkina (d. 1863), wife of poet Alexander Pushkin
- Izmail Sreznevsky (d. 1880), philologist, Slavist, historian, paleographer, folklorist and writer
- Nadezhda Borisovna Trubetskaya (d. 1909), philanthropist
- Nikolay Zinin (d. 1880), organic chemist

== Deaths ==
- Arsen of Tbilisi (b. ?), Georgian aristocrat and bishop
- Karl Gustav von Baggovut (b. 1761), general of Scandinavian ancestry
- Prince Pyotr Ivanovich Bagration (b. 1765), Georgian general and prince
- Jan Benisławski (b. 1735), Polish clergyman, coadjutor bishop of Mogilev
- Andreas Eberhard von Budberg (b. 1750), Baltic German diplomat, foreign minister of Russia 1806-7
- Charles Cameron (b. 1745), Scottish architect of the court of Catherine II of Russia
- Prince Jibrael of Georgia (b. 1788), Georgian prince
- Matvey Kazakov (b. 1738), architect
- Yakov Kulnev (b. 1763), general
- Alexander Kutaisov (b. 1784), general of artillery, died at Battle of Borodino
- Platon Levshin (b. 1737), Metropolitan bishop of Moscow from 1775 to 1812
- Stepan Rumovsky (b. 1734), astronomer and mathematician
- Anton Skalon (b. 1767), general
- Nikolay Tuchkov (b. 1765), general
- Ivan Vasilyev (b. 1776), navigator and exlorer
- Vasily Vyazemsky (b. circa 1775), general
- Shneur Zalman of Liadi (b. 1745), rabbi, founder of the Chabad branch of Hasidic Judaism
- Pyotr Zavadovsky (b. 1735), statesman, lover of Catherine the Great
