= Western Army =

Western Army may refer to:

- Western Army (Japan), an active army of the Japan Ground Self-Defense Force
- Western Army (Ottoman Empire), active during the First Balkan War
- Western Army (Russia), an army of the Russian SFSR formed in 1918
- Western Army of the White Movement, formed in January 1919
- the forces of the Toyotomi clan during the Siege of Osaka

== See also ==
- First Western Army, an army of Imperial Russia active during the Napoleonic Wars
- Second Western Army, an army of Imperial Russia active during the Napoleonic Wars
