= Army of the Danube (1806–1812) =

Field army of the Russian Empire

The Army of the Danube (or Danube Army; alternately the Army of Moldavia) (Russian: Дунайская армия) was a field army of the Russian Empire, created for the Russo-Turkish War of 1806–1812.

Commanded by Admiral Pavel Chichagov from May 1812, it merged with the Third Reserve Army of Observation to form the Third Western Army in September during the French invasion of Russia.

== History ==
The Army of the Danube ended the Russo-Turkish War of 1806–1812 on the Danube; its commander-in-chief, General of the infantry Mikhail Kutuzov, signed the peace treaty ending the war at Bucharest on 28 May [O.S. 16 May]. Admiral Pavel Chichagov was appointed commander-in-chief of the army on 10 June [O.S. 29 May]. While waiting for news of the Ottoman sultan's ratification of the treaty, Chichagov proposed to attack Constantinople, but this plan was dropped after the treaty was ratified. On 21 April [O.S. 9 April] Tsar Alexander I instructed Chicagov to use his army to attack Napoleon's rear and force Austria out of the war by encouraging a Slavic revolt and advancing to the Adriatic Sea. These plans were abandoned due to diplomatic communications between Russia and Austria that revealed that the Austrian contribution to the invasion would be limited to 30,000 men. The chief of staff of the army was Lieutenant General Ivan Sabaneyev, while Major Generals Sergey Tuchkov and Burhardt Berg held the positions of duty general and quartermaster general, respectively. It included the following units:

- 1st Corps (General of the infantry Alexandre Langeron)
  - 22nd Infantry Division (less Olonets Infantry Regiment)
  - 18th Brigade of the 6th Cavalry Division
  - 14th Horse Artillery Company
  - Grekov IV Don Cossack Regiment
  - Panteleyev II Don Cossack Regiment
  - 7th Pontoon Company
- 2nd Corps (Lieutenant General Peter Kirillovich Essen)
  - 8th Infantry Division (less 7th Jager Regiment)
  - Seversk Dragoon Regiment
  - Smolensk Dragoon Regiment
  - Grekov VIII Don Cossack Regiment
  - 15th Horse Artillery Company
  - 8th Pontoon Company
- 3rd Corps (Lieutenant General Alexander Voinov)
  - 10th Infantry Division (less Yaroslavl Infantry Regiment)
  - Kinburn Dragoon Regiment
  - Belorussian Hussar Regiment
  - Melnikov V Don Cossack Regiment
  - 3rd Ural Cossack Regiment
  - 4th Ural Cossack Regiment
  - 38th Artillery Battery
  - 50th Light Artillery Company
- 4th Corps (Lieutenant General Alexander Zass, later replaced by Major General Mikhail Bulatov)
  - 2nd Brigade and Okhotsk Infantry Regiment of the 16th Infantry Division
  - 22nd Brigade, Pereyaslavl Dragoon Regiment, and Chuguyev Uhlan Regiment of the 7th Cavalry Division
  - 39th Artillery Battery
  - 17th Horse Artillery Company
  - Melnikov III Don Cossack Regiment
  - Kuteynikov IV Don Cossack Regiment
- Army Reserve (Lieutenant General Ivan Sabaneyev)
  - Olonets Infantry Regiment
  - Yaroslavl Infantry Regiment
  - 7th Jager Regiment
  - Oliviopol Hussar Regiment
  - Lukovkin II Don Cossack Regiment
  - 16th Horse Artillery Company
  - 2nd Pioneer Regiment (three companies)

The army fielded 57,500 men in 74 battalions, 64 squadrons, fourteen irregular cavalry regiments, and twenty artillery companies on 17 July [O.S. 5 July]. The soldiers of the army had seen much fighting by 1812 and were described by historian Dominic Lieven as "among the best in the Russian army." It began moving north to Volhynia on 31 July [O.S. 19 July] and arrived there in September after a 52 day-march to the Styr River, leaving behind elements to cover the border. On 12 September [O.S. 31 August] the army included 43,600 men in 71 battalions, 64 squadrons, ten irregular cavalry regiments, and eighteen artillery companies. The army linked up with the Alexander Tormasov's Third Reserve Army of Observation on 19 September [O.S. 7 September], fighting in the Battle of Liuboml before being combined with Tormasov's army to form the Third Western Army under the command of Chichagov on 30 September [O.S. 18 September].

== See also ==
- Russian Army order of battle (1812)
