= Battle of Kaidanowo =

1812 battle during Napoleon's invasion of Russia

- Part of the French invasion of Russia
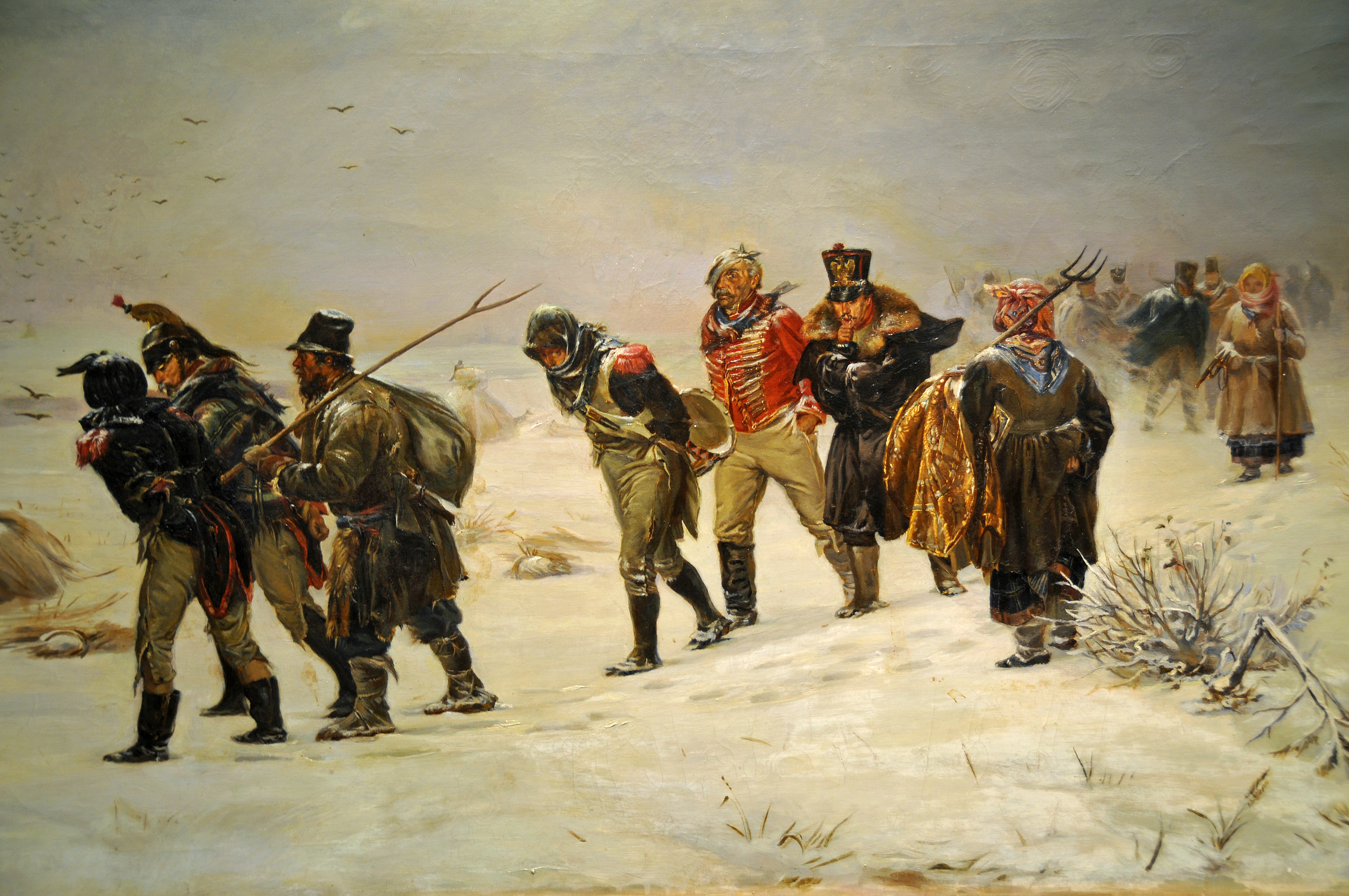
- Napoleon's retreat by Illarion Pryanishnikov
Date	15 November 1812
Location	Koydanovo, Minsk Governorate, Russian Empire (today Dzyarzhynsk, Belarus)
Result	Russian victory

Belligerents
Russian Empire	(First French Empire) French Empire; Duchy of Warsaw (Kingdom of Württemberg) Württemberg

Commanders and leaders
(Russian Empire) Charles de Lambert	(Duchy of Warsaw) Franciszek Ksawery Kossecki

Strength
3,800–4,000	1,300–2,000

Casualties and losses
Unknown	1,000–2,000; 2 cannon 2 standards 10 ammunition wagons

French invasion of Russia
current battle
Prussian corps
Napoleon
Austrian corps

The Battle of Kaidanowo (Koydanovo) was fought on Sunday, 15 November 1812, near the village of Kaidanowo or Koydanovo, part of the Russian Empire at the time (now Dzyarzhynsk in Belarus). A Polish-Lithuanian, Württembergian, and French force under Polish General Franciszek Ksawery Kossecki of 1,300-2,000 was defeated by seasoned Russian forces led by General Charles de Lambert of about 3,800-4,000.

== Background ==
On one side was General Kossecki's division, which had been mauled two days previously at Nowo Schwerschen, reinforced after the battle with Württembergian infantry and French cavalry units. On the other side was cavalry from the Army of the Danube.

== Order of Battle ==
According to Pugačiauskas, the regiments under Kossecki were:

- incompletely formed 22nd Lithuanian Infantry Regiment (1,500)
- 18th Lithuanian Uhlan Regiment (940)
- Kossakowski's Lithuanian Rifle Regiment (two battalions, total 634)

== Battle ==
Lambert mounted a pursuit, catching them at Kaidanowo, where he destroyed most of the detachment.

The Russian cavalry charge proved devastating, as the unseasoned 22nd Lithuanian Infantry Regiment did not withstand it and retreated. The regiment's commander, Stanisław Czapski, tried to halt the retreat and even shot insubordinate soldiers, but his actions were unable to rectify the situation. All three Polish-Lithuanian regiments suffered losses.

Kossecki and about 100 of his cavalry escaped back to Minsk.

== Aftermath ==
Of the 22nd Lithuanian Infantry Regiment, a mere 30 officers and 53 soldiers remained. Stanisław Czapski was awarded the Legion of Honour by Napoleon due to his effort in this battle.

The 18th Lithuanian Uhlan Regiment survived this battle, which was its first, relatively unscathed, as it managed to evade Russian capture and retreated towards Berezina.

Bronikowski and about 1,000 men evacuated Minsk and, including about 500 men of the 7th Württembergian Infantry Regiment, marched to Barysaw. A number of civilians of the administration together with many soldiers escaped to Vilnius, where they caused a panic because the inhabitants thought that the Russians were following them.

== See also ==
- List of battles of the French invasion of Russia

== Sources ==
- Bodart, Gaston (1908). Militär-historisches Kriegs-Lexikon (1618-1905) (in German).
- clash-of-steel (2021). "Battle Name : Kaidanowo".
- Pugačiauskas, Virgilijus (2007). "Lietuvos nuostoliai 1812 m. kare". Karo Archyvas (in Lithuanian). 22. Vilnius: General Jonas Žemaitis Military Academy of Lithuania: 89–110. doi:10.47459/ka.2007.22.3. ISSN 1392-6489. S2CID 240264768.
- Pugačiauskas, Virgilijus (2019). XIX a. Lietuvos karinių dalinių istorija (in Lithuanian). Vilnius: General Jonas Žemaitis Military Academy of Lithuania. ISBN 978-609-8074-97-0.
- Riehn, Richard K. (1990). 1812 : Napoleon's Russian campaign. McGraw-Hill. ISBN 9780070527317.
- Smith, Digby (2004). Napoleon against Russia: a concise history of 1812. Great Britain: Pen and Sword Military. ISBN 9781783409587.
