= Haradzyechna, Pruzhany district =

Village in Brest Region, Belarus

Haradzyechna Гарадзечна (Belarusian) Городечно (Russian)
- Village
- Location within Belarus
- Coordinates: 52°25′27″N 24°18′40″E
- Country: Belarus
- Region: Brest Region
- District: Pruzhany District
- Time zone: UTC+3 (MSK)

Haradzyechna (Belarusian: Гарадзечна, romanized: Haradziečna; Russian: Городечно, romanized: Gorodechno) is a village in Pruzhany District, Brest Region, Belarus. It is part of Shani selsoviet.

== History ==
During the French invasion of Russia, French forces and Russian forces clashed at the Battle of Gorodechno in August 1812.
