= Battle of Borisov =

1812 battle during Napoleon's invasion of Russia

- Part of the French invasion of Russia
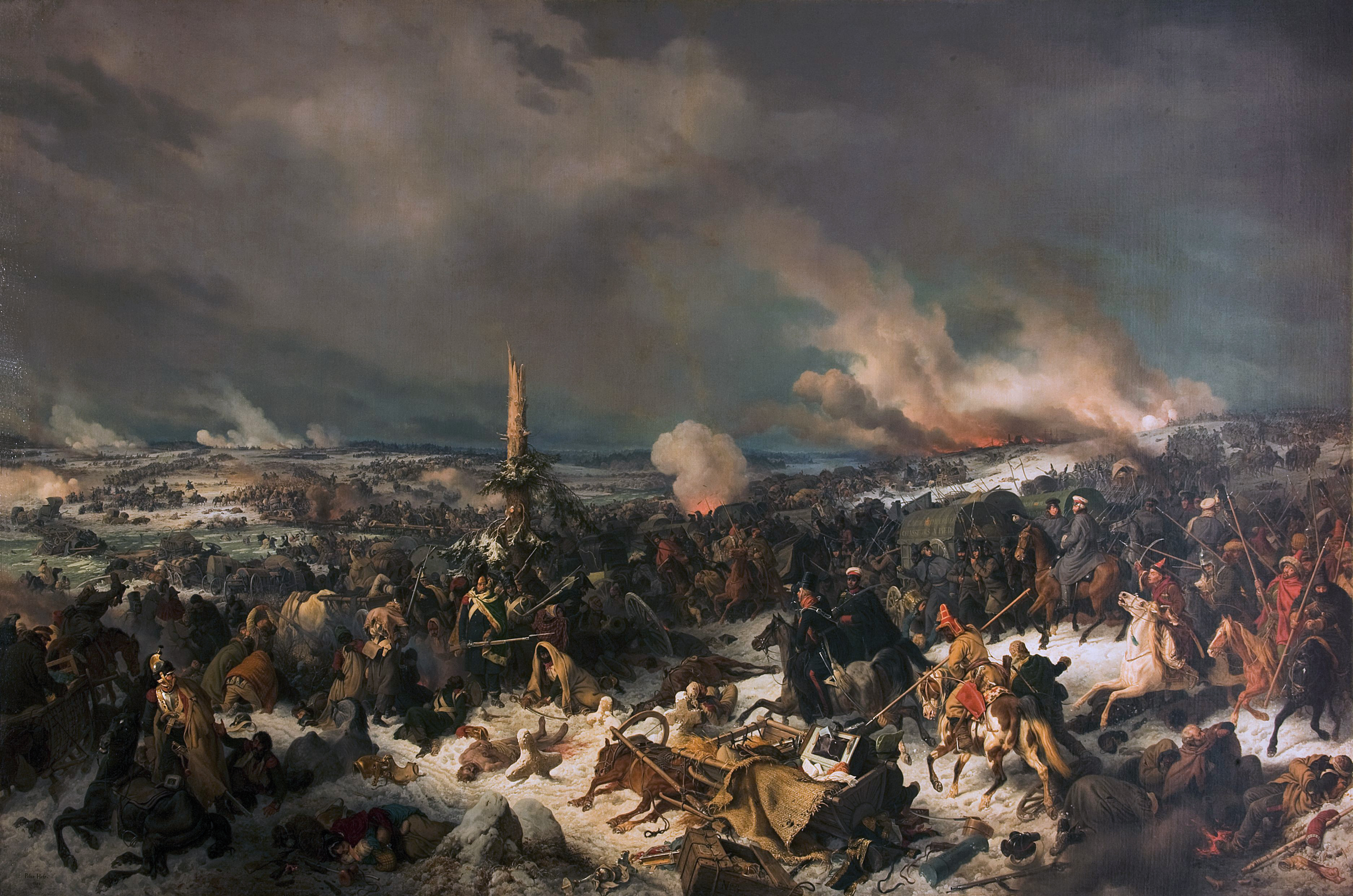
- Kalmyks and Bashkirs attacking French troops at the Berezina (the painting Crossing the Berezina River by Peter von Hess)
Date	21 November 1812
Location	Borisov, Russian Empire 54°13′40″N 28°30′17″E
Result	Russian victory

Belligerents
Duchy of Warsaw (First French Empire) French Empire	Russian Empire

Commanders and leaders
Jan Henryk Dąbrowski	(Russian Empire) Charles de Lambert (WIA)

Strength
3,000	3,500

Casualties and losses
3,000, 6 cannon, 2 colours, 1 eagle	2,000

French invasion of Russia
current battle
Prussian corps
Napoleon
Austrian corps

The Battle of Borisov, a meeting engagement that took place on 21 November 1812, between parts of the French army and parts of the Russian armies. The Russian vanguard under Charles de Lambert eliminated the Franco-Polish force under Dombrowsky.

== Background ==
The French had suffered a defeat just two weeks earlier during the Battle of Krasnoi. Napoleon's army amounted to no more than 20,000 combatants. However, the union with Victor, Oudinot, and Dombrowsky brought the numerical strength of the Grande Armée back up to some 49,000 French combatants as well as about 40,000 stragglers. But Minsk had been occupied by Chichagov on 16 November 1812 who reached the Berezina with about 31,500 combatants.

== Battle ==
On the 21 November, the Russians under Lambert occupied Borisov in the morning before Oudinot could come up as the sentries had been ambushed. Dombrowski had about 2,000 men left out of his total force. The Russian casualties were about 2,000. Lambert was seriously wounded in the leg.

== Aftermath ==
The Russians destroyed the bridge at Borisov on 22 November. The Battle of Loschniza is Oudinot's reaction.

== See also ==
- List of battles of the French invasion of Russia
