= 22nd Lithuanian Infantry Regiment =

- Active: July 1812 – December 1813
- Country: Lithuania (1812)
- Engagements: French invasion of Russia; Battle of Kaidanowo; War of the Sixth Coalition; Siege of Modlin (1813)

Commanders
- First and only: Stanisław Hutten-Czapski

22nd Lithuanian Infantry Regiment – infantry regiment of the Army of the Duchy of Warsaw.

== 1812 ==
The regiment was raised in 1812 in Minsk at the expense of Colonel Stanisław Hutten-Czapski, who took command of it on July 13 of that year. The regiment's major was Hilchen, and the battalion commanders were Mieszkowski, Łaszewski, Jezierski, and Bitner.

Three months after the regiment began to be formed, Czapski still wrote in October 1812, that the regiment was not at full strength and lacked 600 men. In addition, the 2nd Battalion was unarmed.

The unit fought near Babruysk, Klyetsk (mid-October 1812) and near Minsk (November 15, 1812).

== 1813 ==
As of May 1, 1813, 12 officers and 53 soldiers from the regiment were still defending at the siege of Modlin.

== 1814 ==
After Napoleon's abdication, Tsar Alexander I of Russia agreed to repatriate Polish–Lithuanian units. They were to serve as a base for the formation of the Army of Congress Poland under the command of Grand Duke Konstantin. On June 13, 1814, the regiment was assigned a concentration site in Płock. However, the regiment was not recreated, as the new army provided for only 12 infantry regiments.

== Bibliography ==
- Gaidis, Henry L. (Spring 1984). Klimas, Antanas (ed.). "Napoleon's Lithuanian Forces". Lituanus. 30 (1). ISSN 0024-5089.
- Nafziger, George (2012). "Grande Armée, 1 May 1813" (PDF). Archived from the original (PDF) on 22 October 2020.

=== Polish-language sources ===
- Tomaszewicz, Andrzej (2006). "Wojsko Wielkiego Księstwa Litewskiego w roku 1812". Nasz Czas (in Polish). 18 (692).
- Wimmer, Jan (1978). Historia piechoty polskiej do roku 1864 (in Polish). Warszawa: Wydawnictwo Ministerstwa Obrony Narodowej.
- Zych, Gabriel (1961). Armia Księstwa Warszawskiego 1807–1812 (in Polish). Warszawa: Wydawnictwo Ministerstwa Obrony Narodowej.

==== By Gembarzewski ====
- Askenazy, Szymon; Gembarzewski, Bronisław (2003). Wojsko Polskie: Księstwo Warszawskie 1807–1814 (in Polish). Poznań: Wydawnictwo Kurpisz. ISBN 8388841475.
- Gembarzewski, Bronisław (1925). Rodowody pułków polskich i oddziałów równorzędnych od r. 1717 do r. 1831 (in Polish). Warszawa: Towarzystwo Wiedzy Wojskowej.
- Gembarzewski, Bronisław (1964). Żołnierz polski. Ubiór, uzbrojenie i oporządzenie od wieku XI do roku 1960 (in Polish). Vol. 3: od 1797 do 1814 roku. Warszawa.
