= Third Reserve Army of Observation =

The Third Reserve Army of Observation was a Russian army created during 1811 as an impromptu force to watch the Austrian frontier when it became apparent that the Austrian Emperor would possibly send troops into Russia as part of the French invasion of Russia. It was also needed to provide support to Bagration's flank and rear from the Duchy of Warsaw's side and maintain public order in the Volhynia and Podolia governorates. It had 44,000 men and 168 guns. Alexander Tormasov took command of the army on 27 March 1812. It was renamed the Third Western Army on 30 September 1812 following its merger with the Army of the Danube. The Third Western Army, led by Pavel Chichagov, failed to cut off Napoleon's army's retreat, though it followed the French into Poland the following January.

== Composition ==
Commander-in-Chief General of the Cavalry Alexander Tormasov
Chief of Staff General Major I. N. Inzov
General-quartermaster - Colonel R. E. Renni
Duty General - Fligel-Adjutant Colonel K. F. Oldekop
Chief of Artillery - General Major I. Kh. Sivers

- Group of General of the Infantry S. M. Kamensky 1st
- Group of General Lieutenant Ye. I. Markov
- Group of General Lieutenant Baron F. W. Osten-Sacken
- Cavalry group of the General Major Graf K. O. Lambert

The total strength of the Army was 60 battalions, 76 squadrons, 10 Cossack regiments, and 168 guns.

== See also ==
- First Western Army
- Second Western Army
