= Alexander Tormasov =

Russian general (1752–1819)

Coordinates: 55°42′53″N 37°36′6.7″E

Count Alexander Petrovich Tormasov
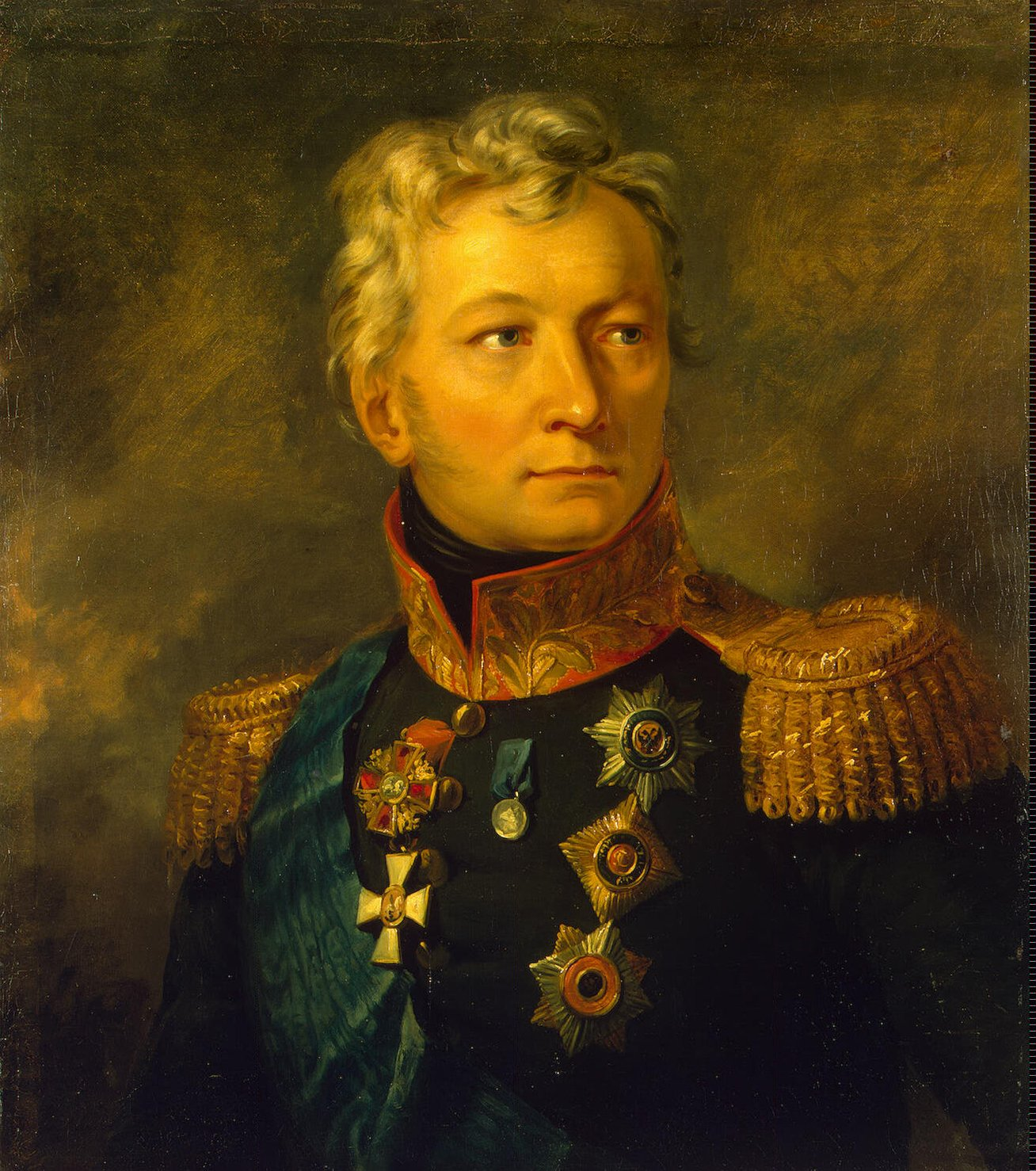
- Portrait by George Dawe, c. 1820, Hermitage
- Born: August 22, 1752; Moscow, Russia
- Died: November 25, 1819 (aged 67); Moscow, Russia
- Occupations: General; Statesman

Member of the State Council
- In office 1811–posthumously
- Monarch: Alexander

Governor for the Civil Division of the Moscow Governorate
- In office 1814 – 1816 – 1819
- Monarch: Alexander
- Military career
- Allegiance: Russia
- Branch: Imperial Russian Army
- Commands: Third Reserve Army of Observation
- Conflicts: Battle of Racławice; Battle of Praga; Battle of Kobrin; Battle of Gorodechno; Battle of Krasnoi; Battle of Lützen (1813)
- Awards: Order of St. George; Golden Weapon for Bravery; Order of St. Andrew

Count Alexander Petrovich Tormasov (Russian: Алекса́ндр Петро́вич Торма́сов; 22 August [O.S. 11 August] 1752 – 25 November [O.S. 13 November] 1819) was a Russian cavalry general prominent during the Napoleonic Wars.

== Early life ==
Alexander Tormasov was born on 22 August 1752 into an old ethnic Russian noble family. At the age of ten, he entered service as a Page of Honour, then, aged 20 in 1772 he began military service as a lieutenant of the Vyatka infantry regiment. Within a few weeks he joined the staff of Yakov Bruce as aide-de-camp. Three years later Tormasov formed and headed the Finland Chasseur regiment with the rank of lieutenant colonel. In 1782 Prince Potemkin charged to him an operation in the Crimea. Following that Tormasov commanded the Dalmatsky Hussars, on the base of which he formed and led the Aleksandriysk Light Cavalry Regiment with the rank of colonel.

Tormasov was a Freemason, dedicated no later than 1785.

== First time as general ==
In 1788–1791 he took part in the Russo-Turkish War, serving at the Siege of Ochakov and the Danube river raids, and was promoted to major general on 21 March 1791. He commanded the left flank cavalry at the storm of Machin, for which he received the Order of St. George 3rd Class. In 1792 and 1794 he [in general] successfully acted against the Polish–Lithuanian Commonwealth during the Polish–Russian War of 1792 and Kościuszko Uprising, being at Maciejowice and commanding a column under Suvorov in the assault on Praga, awarded Golden Weapon for Bravery. He was also commanding at Racławice, a failed engagement.

Like many other generals of this time, he was dismissed by Emperor Paul I on 11 July 1799 and was imprisoned in the Dünamünde fortress for several months. On 16 November 1800 he was restored in the army. On 15 September 1801, on the day of the coronation of the new Emperor Alexander I he was promoted to Full General of cavalry. Later he took up an administrative post until 1803.

== Time as governor and commander ==
From 1803 Tormasov served as governor of Kiev, Minsk, and from 1807 Riga. From 1809 to 1811, he served as a Viceroy of Georgia and as the commander-in-chief in the Caucasus during the Russo-Persian War (1804–1813). Ensured the inclusion of the Kingdom of Imereti into the Russian Empire (1810).

After the French invasion of Russia began, Tormasov became the Chief Commander of the 40,000-man Third Reserve Army of Observation on 27 March 1812. Advancing North against Jean Reynier in mid July, he overwhelmed Klengel's Saxon brigade at Kobryn 27th, marking the first Russian victory in the campaign. Tormasov received the Order of St. George 2nd Class for this. Defeated in turn by Reynier and Schwarzenberg at Gorodetschna (Podobna, Prujany) 12 August, he then withdrew to Ratno to join with the corps of Pavel Chichagov, meeting him on the Styr River 18 September. The combined command then acted under the orders of Mikhail Kutuzov, and fought at Brest-Litovsk 9 October. Ordered to envelop the Grande Armée at Lyady, Tormasov commanded the combined forces of the 1st and 2nd Western armies at the 2nd Battle of Krasnoe 15 November, awarded the Order of St. Andrew. Appointed by Kutuzov with internal management of all troops in December, he was then temporarily made overall commander of the Russian main Army after Kutuzov's death.

In 1813 he commanded the Russian army forces at the Battle of Lützen, but then resigned due to failing health.

== Late life and career ==
Since 1811 he held the position of a member of the State Council. On 30 August 1814 he succeeded Count Fyodor Rostopchin as Governor-general of the Moscow Governorate and was the governor for the Civil Division of the Moscow Governorate from 1814 to 1816 and from 1816 to 1819. Two years later he received a comital title for his efforts in rebuilding the city.

After his death in Moscow on November 25, 1819, he was buried in the Donskoy Monastery. Tormasov's only son died in 1839 and thus this family became extinct.

== Gallery ==
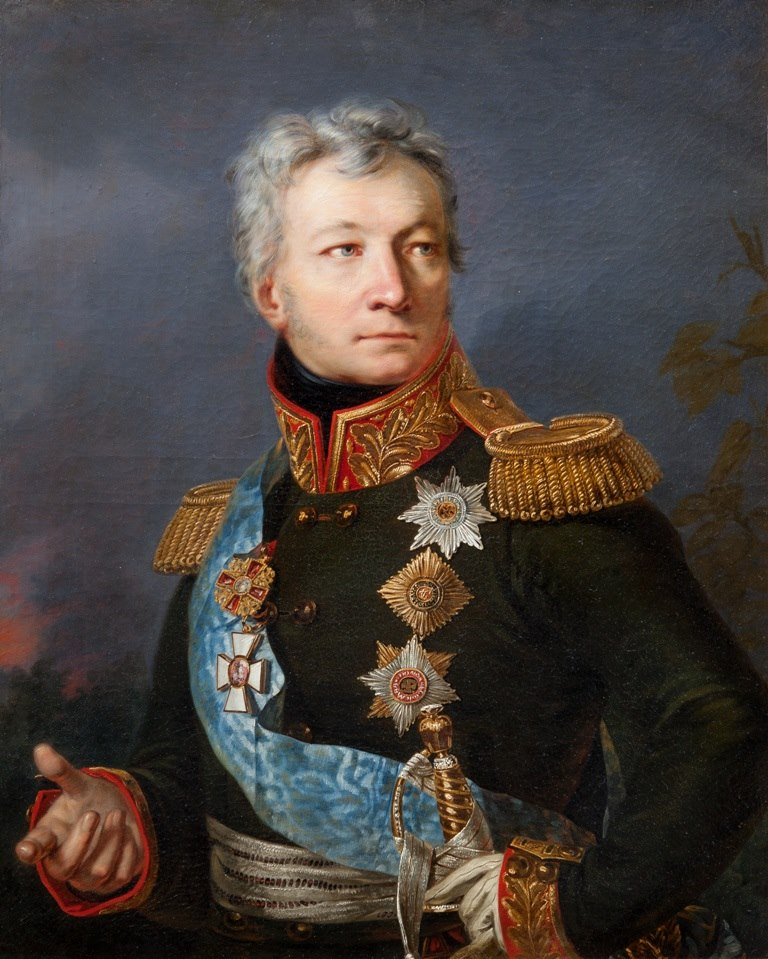
Portrait by C. C. P. Reichel, 1813, State Historical Museum

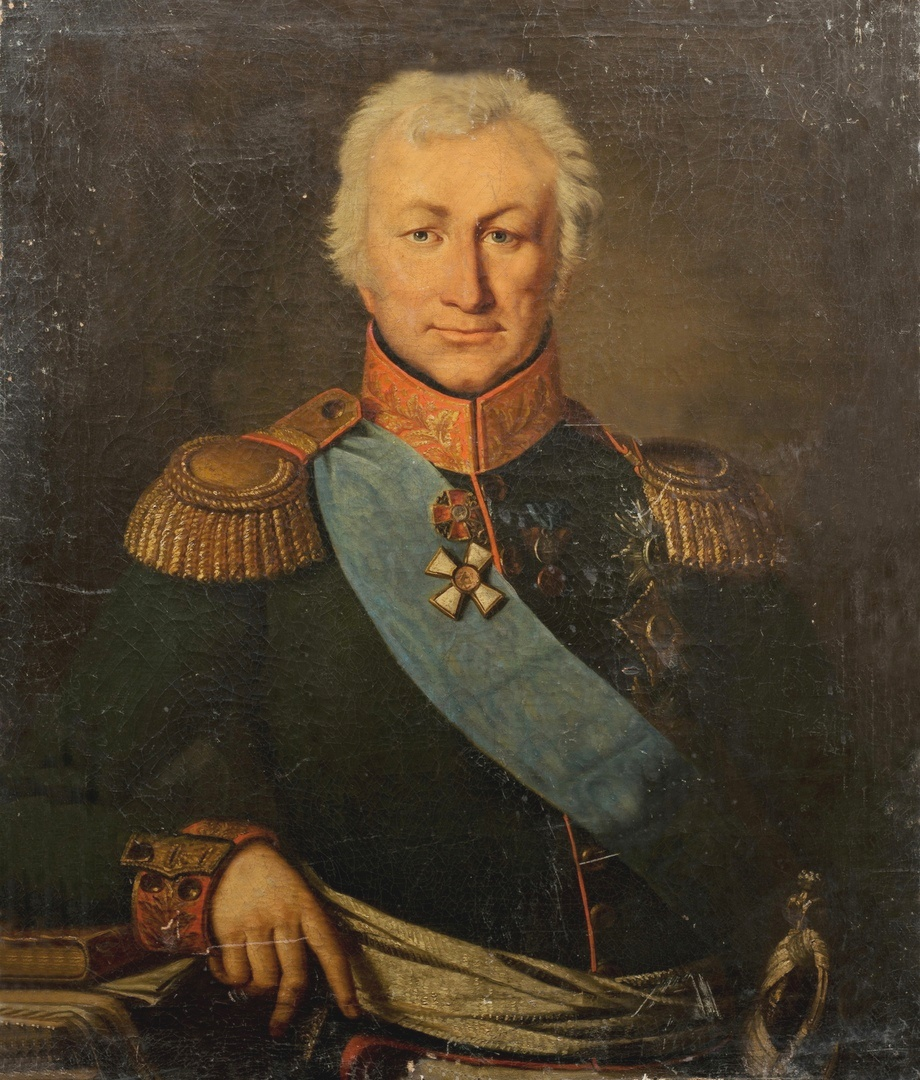
By an unidentified artist, 1818

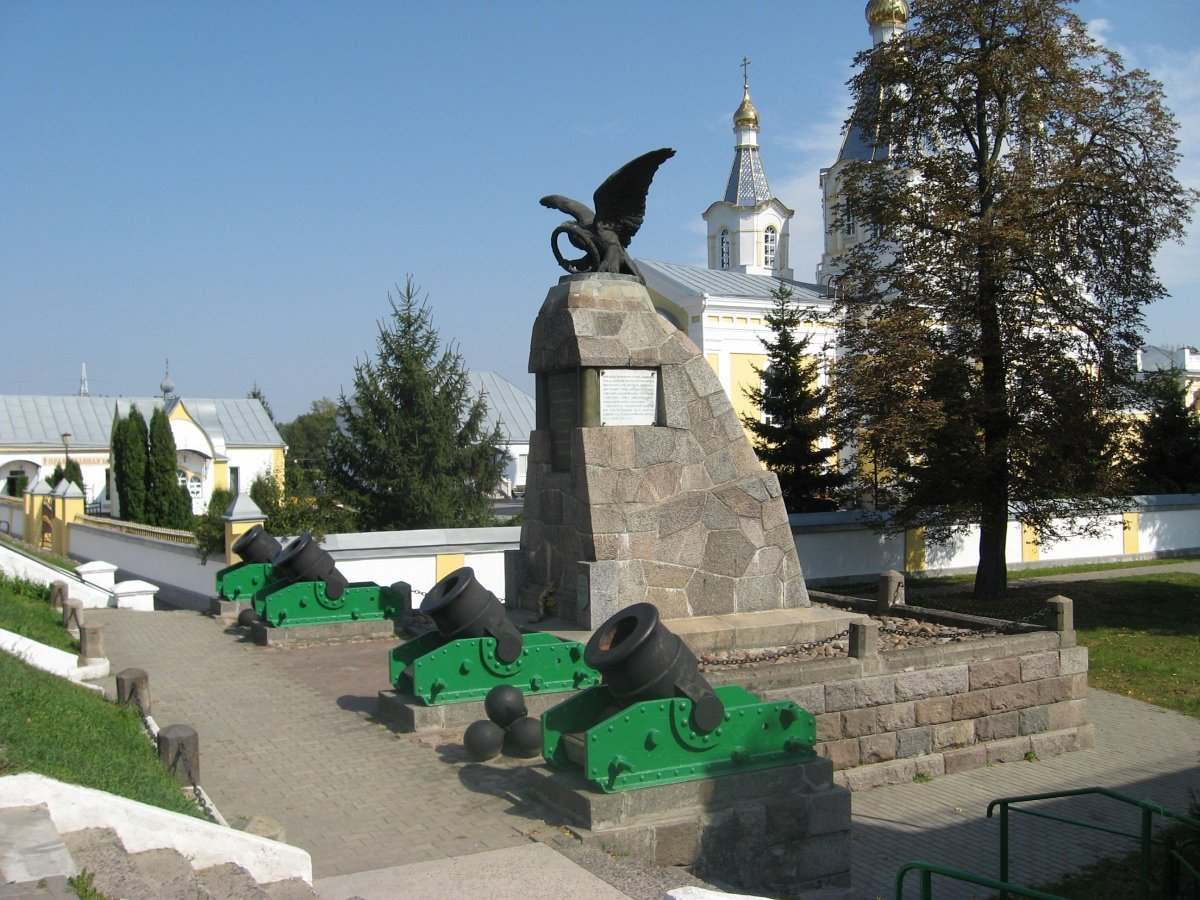
Monument to the Battle of Kobrin (Kobryn)

== Sources ==
- Mikaberidze, Alexander (2005). Russian Officer Corps of the Revolutionary and Napoleonic Wars. Casemate Publishers. ISBN 978-1611210026.

Preceded by Andrei Fensh	War Governor of Kiev Governorate; 1803 – 1806	Succeeded by Mikhail Kutuzov
Preceded by Fyodor Rostopchin	War Governor of Moscow Governorate; 1814 – 1819	Succeeded by Dmitriy Golitsyn
