= Vasily Vyazemsky =

Russian military regimental and divisional commander

Prince Vasily Vasilevich Vyazemsky
- Native name: Василий Васильевич Вяземский
- Born: December 1775; Klimovo, Kolomna Uyezd, Moscow Governorate, Russian Empire
- Died: 17 December 1812 (aged 36–37) Minsk, Russian Empire
- Allegiance: Russian Empire
- Service years: 1794–1812
- Rank: Major general
- Conflicts: Kościuszko Uprising; Russo-Turkish War (1806–1812); French invasion of Russia
- Awards: Order of Saint Anna; Order of Saint Vladimir; Order of Saint John of Jerusalem; Cross "For the Capture of Praga"

Prince Vasily Vasilyevich Vyazemsky (Russian: Василий Васильевич Вяземский; c. 1775–1812) was a Russian military regimental and divisional commander during the French invasion of Russia. He was also a General of the Imperial Russian Army.

== Early life ==
Vyazemsky was born in December 1775 in the village of Klimovo, which at the time was part of the Kolomna Uyezd (later Bronnitsky Uyezd, now the territory of Ozyorsky District, Moscow Oblast). He was born from nobility and his father was a court councilor. He lost his parents at a young age, after which his elder sister and her husband took care of him. Vyazemsky was educated at Moscow University Boarding School and later enrolled at Mining University.

== Career ==
In 1786, Vyazemsky was admitted to the Preobrazhensky Life Guards Regiment as a sergeant, but his actual military service only began in 1790.

Since 1792, Vyazemsky served as an orderly of Alexander Suvorov and took part in the Kościuszko Uprising. The following year, he was promoted to the rank of prime major, and was sent to serve in field regiments. On October 1, 1799, he became a colonel.

On July 13, 1800, Vyazemsky was entrusted with the command of the 11th Jaeger Regiment, and on July 27 of the same year, he took the post of chief of the 13th Jaeger Regiment.

On November 23, 1803, Vyazemsky acceded to the rank of Major General. He participated in an expedition to the Septinsular Republic in a campaign to Naples, where he fought with the Montenegrins at New Ragusa against the army of Napoleon.

His courage during the Russo-Turkish War of 1806–1812 was noted by the command, and he was awarded the Order of Saint Anna of the 1st degree.

During the French invasion of Russia, the regiment Vyazemsky commanded was a part of the 3rd brigade of the 15th Infantry Division, which was part of the Yevgeni Markov's corps of the 3rd Reserve Observatory Army. He fought in battles, including the battle of Kobrin and the battle of Gorodechno. On November 9, 1812, Vyazemsky was mortally wounded during the assault of Borisov. He died in the Minsk military hospital on December 5.

No portrait of Vyazemsky got into the "Military Gallery of the Winter Palace".

== Sources ==
- (in Russian) Alexander Podmazo - Dictionary of Russian generals, participants in military operations against the army of Napoleon Bonaparte in 1812-1815., TriTe studio, 1996, ISNN 0869-20011
- (in Russian) Sergey Shumikhin - Military diaries, Soviet Russia, 1990, ISBN 5-268-00886-2
