= 18th Lithuanian Uhlan Regiment =

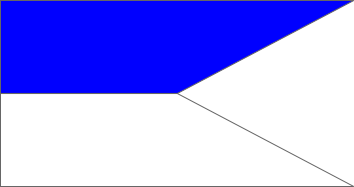
- Lance pennant
- Active: 1812–1813
- Country: Lithuania (1812)
- Engagements: French invasion of Russia; Battle of Kaidanowo

Commanders
- First and only: Karol Dominik Przezdziecki

18th Lithuanian Uhlan Regiment – uhlan regiment of the Army of the Duchy of Warsaw.

== Formation and fighting ==
The formation of the 18th Uhlan Regiment was initially entrusted to Józef Wawrzecki, but he, busy with work in the Military Committee and not having the necessary assets, handed over the command to Karol Dominik Przezdziecki.

Under new command, a regiment was formed in Nyasvizh from the Minsk Department's conscripts. To streamline the formation of units, special commissioners were appointed to support regimental commanders. In the 18th Uhlan Regiment, this was General Franciszek Wyszkowski.

Soon, however, the regiment was forced to abandon its base, threatened by the Imperial Russian Army. It fought at the Battle of Kaidanowo on November 15, 1812. On December 1, 1812, after the fighting in the Minsk region, and especially after Kaidanowo, the regiment still numbered 486 officers and soldiers.

The soldiers' uniform had yellow lapels.

Regimental commander

- Colonel Karol Przeździecki – from 13 July 1812

== Bibliography ==
- Żygulski jun, Zdzisław; Wielecki (1988). Polski mundur wojskowy. Kraków: Krajowa Agencja Wydawnicza. ISBN 83-03-01483-8.
- Minkiewicz, Jan (1985). Ułańskie dzieje. Londyn: VERITAS.
- Gembarzewski, Bronisław (1925). Rodowody pułków polskich i oddziałów równorzędnych od r. 1717 do r. 1831. Warszawa: Towarzystwo Wiedzy Wojskowej.
- Morawski, Ryszard; Paczuski (2009). Wojsko Księstwa Warszawskiego. Ułani, gwardie honorowe, pospolite ruszenie, żandarmeria konna. Warszawa. ISBN 978-83-61229-03-2.
