= Stanisław Hutten-Czapski =

Polish noble and soldier (1779–1844)

Stanisław Hutten-Czapski, of Leliwa (b. 1779 in Nyasvizh, d. 1844 in Kėdainiai) was a Polish–Lithuanian Count, who later became a decorated Colonel during the Napoleonic Wars. He was the son of Franciszek Stanisław Hutten-Czapski, the voivode of Chełmno and Veronica Radziwill (1754–?), sister of Prince Karol Stanisław Radziwiłł.

== Early life ==
Stanisław and his brother Karol spent their childhood at the Nesvizh Castle with their uncle Prince Karol Stanisław Radziwiłł, the wealthiest magnate of Poland and Lithuania. They were then educated by Piarist Fathers in a college in Vilnius.

== Napoleonic Wars ==
Stanisław Hutten-Czapski was in the Polish Legions.

=== Invasion of Russia of 1812 ===
In July, 1812, Emperor Napoleon Bonaparte appointed Stanisław as Colonel and commander of the 22nd Lithuanian Infantry Regiment. With it, he partook in the beginning of Napoleon's invasion of Russia, fighting bravely in the battle of Kaidanava, for which he was awarded Virtuti Militari. During Napoleon's retreat from Russia, Stanisław fought in the battle of Berezina.

=== German Campaign of 1813 ===
During the German Campaign of 1813, Czapski fought in the Battle of Dresden with his regiment and was awarded the French Legion of Honour for his conduct. He later fought in the Battle of Hanau in October 1813, in which his close friend Prince Dominik Hieronim Radzivil was killed.

== Estates ==
The Tsarist authorities confiscated his Lithuanian Estates, but later Stanisław and his brother Karol were amnestied by Tsar Alexander I of Russia, and their properties in Lithuania were returned to them.

Stanisław's Lakhva estate was destroyed during the war. He received the Kėdainiai estate in Lithuania as part of his maternal inheritance from the Radziwills. He established himself in Swojatycze, near Minsk, and dedicated himself to agricultural activities, hunting, and purchasing and selling properties. From 1827 to 1844, the count lived in the manor house which he established by the Dotnuvėlė stream near Kėdainiai. Here he took care of agriculture, forestry and raising horses. At the end of his life, he found himself in economic difficulties. He died in 1844. After his death, his eldest son Marian inherited the estate.

== Personal life ==
In 1810 Stanisław Czapski married Sophia (1797–1866), the daughter of the Castellan of Minsk, Michała Obuchowicza (1760–1818), and had four children: Michalina, Marian, Adolf and Edward. Stanisław's brother Karol married Sophia's sister, Fabianna Obuchowicza (1787–1876).

== Decorations ==
- Polish Virtuti Militari 3rd class
- French Legion of Honor

== Bibliography ==
- Kėdainiai region museum (2020). Kėdainiai - Istorija [Kėdainiai - History] (PDF) (in Lithuanian).
- Bielecki, Robert (1990). Berezina 1812. MON. ISBN 9788311078314.
- Chwalczewski, Jerzy; Dąbrowski, Ignacy (1938). "CZAPSKI HUTTEN Stanisław (1779-1844)". Polish Biographical Dictionary. Vol. IV. Kraków: Polska Akademia Umiejętnośc.
- Nawrot, Dariusz (2008). Litwa i Napoleon w 1812 roku [Lithuania and Napoleon in 1812]. Uniwersytet Slaski. ISBN 9788322617489.
