= Alexander Kutaisov =

Russian artillery commander

Graf Alexander Ivanovich Kutaisov
- Александр Иванович Кутайсов
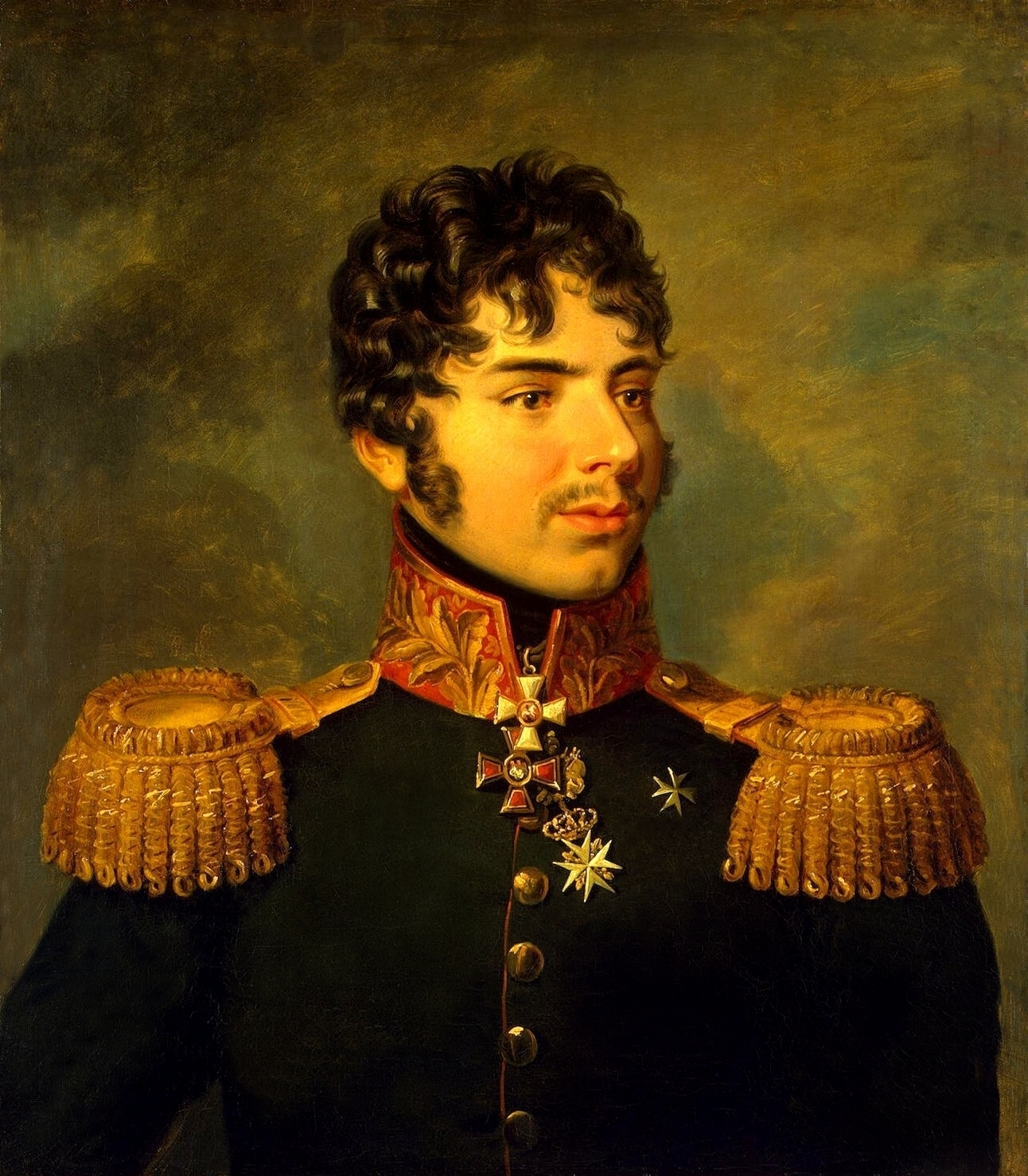
- Portrait by George Dawe in the Hermitage Museum
- Born: 10 September 1784 (Note: Old Style date: 30 August 1784); Saint Petersburg, Saint Petersburg Governorate
- Died: 7 September 1812 (27) (Note: Old Style date: 26 August 1812) near Borodino, Moscow Governorate
- Other name: Aleksandr Ivanovich Kutaysov
- Relatives: ru:House of Kutaisov
- Military career
- Allegiance: Russia
- Branch: Imperial Russian Army
- Service years: 1793–1812
- Rank: Major general
- Awards: Order of St. George 3rd degree

Graf Alexander Ivanovich Kutaisov (Note: Russian: Алекса́ндр Ива́нович Кута́йсов) (Kutaysov; 10 September 1784 – 7 September 1812) was an Imperial Russian military commander, namely a major general who specialized in artillery. His death during the Battle of Borodino undermined the combat capability of the Russian gunners.

== Biography ==
Kutaisov was born in Saint Petersburg, of Turkish origin. The surname comes as far as from the name of the ancestor's hometown, Kütahya. He received a home education. In 1805, he was already an artillery colonel; in the wars of the Third and Fourth coalitions, he proved himself to be a remarkably brave leader of horse artillery and especially distinguished himself in the Battle of Eylau. In 1812, he was chief of artillery of the First Western Army; he participated in all rearguard actions during its retreat; he was killed near Borodino.

== Sources ==
- "Кутайсов, Александр Иванович".
- "Кутайсов" [Kutaisov]. Great Russian Encyclopedia. 2016.
- "Кутайсовы" [House of Kutaisov]. Great Russian Encyclopedia. 2016.
