= Pimen Orlov =

Russian painter (1812–1865)

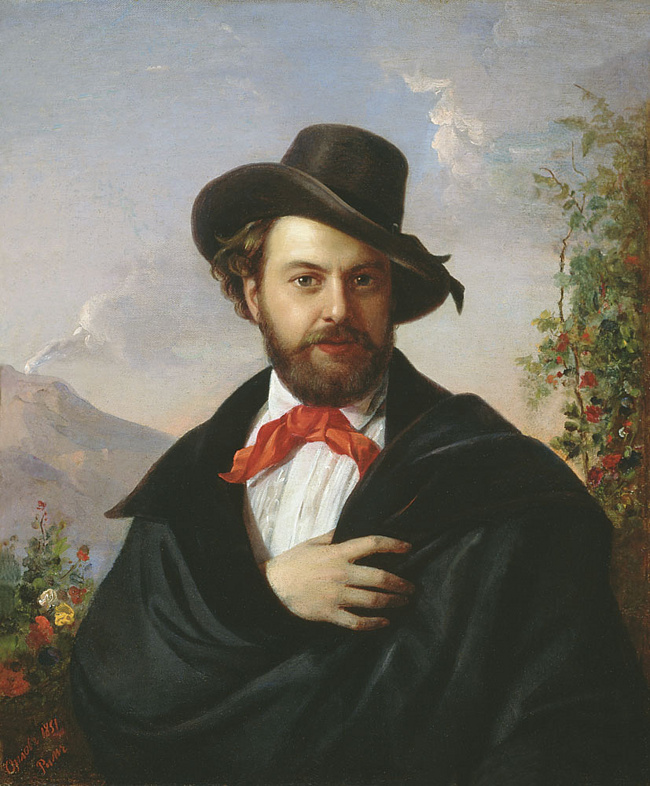
Self-portrait (1851)

Pimen Nikitich Orlov (Russian: Пи́мен Ники́тич Орлóв; 1812, near Malo-Foshchevaty, Ostrogozhsky Uyezd, Voronezh Governorate — 6 October 1865, Rome) was a Russian painter in the Classical style. He worked in a wide variety of genres and spent most of his career in Italy.

== Biography ==
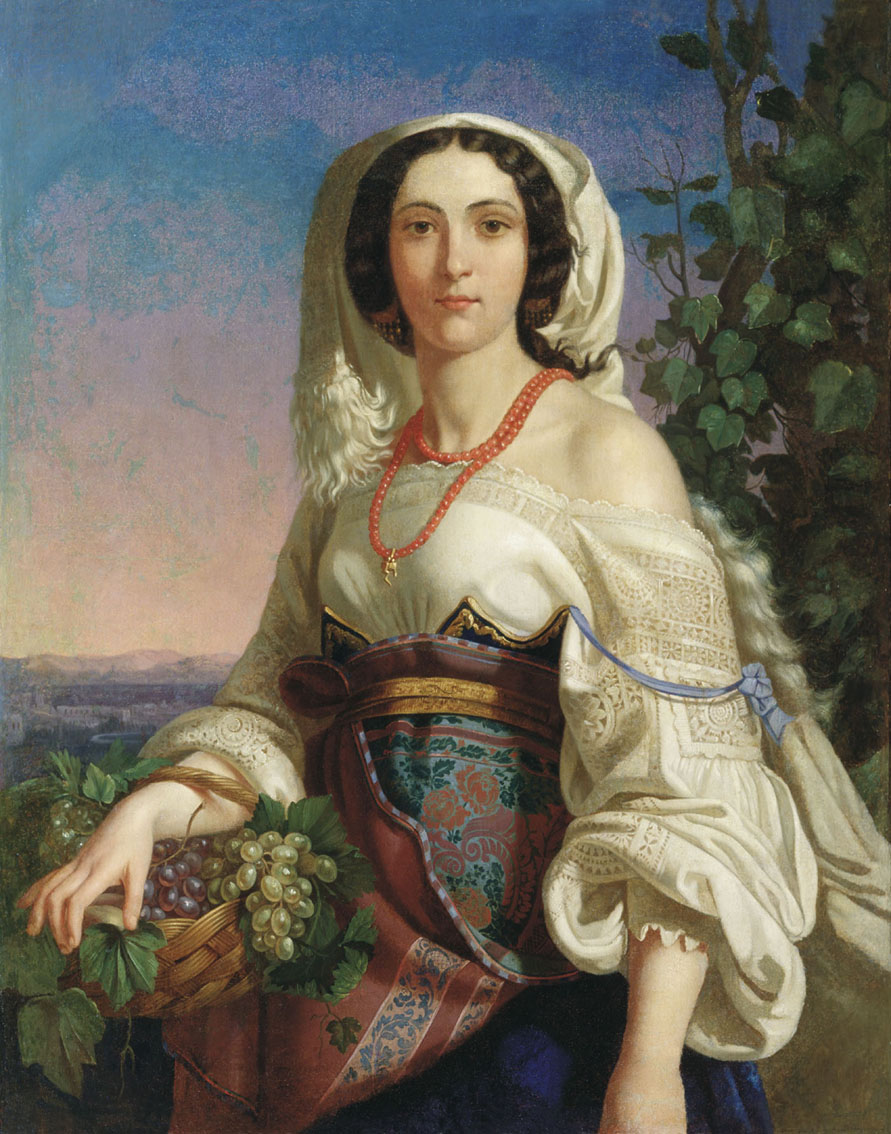
Neapolitan Woman

He was born on a farm to a family of millers. At an early age, he showed a talent for drawing. His father wanted him to continue the family business and could not afford to pay for an art school in any event.

He was determined, however, and apprenticed himself to an itinerant decorative painter when he was a teenager. They travelled from village to village, painting signs and billboards as well as doing simple paint jobs on walls and fences. He changed employers as his experience grew, but still received no orders for icons or murals.

He eventually turned to painting portraits of local landowners and, in 1834, with recommendations from the Gladkis, a Ukrainian noble family, he was able to go to Saint Petersburg and audit classes at the Imperial Academy of Arts, where he studied with Karl Bryullov and decided to become a painter of genre scenes. While studying, he continued painting portraits to help support himself. Members of the Golitsyn family were among his most notable clients. He graduated in 1837 with a silver medal and the title of "Free Artist".

In 1841, with the support of the Imperial Society for the Encouragement of the Arts, he obtained a grant that enabled him to go to Italy. He established himself in Rome and soon had a steady flow of commissions, although he was still not financially secure. Then, in 1848, he sent home a painting ("Young Woman Doing Laundry") that was brought to the attention of Tsar Nicholas I, who awarded him an annual pension of 300 Rubles.

The following year, all pensioners were ordered to return to Russia, but he was able to get permission to stay, pleading eye disease and the necessity of completing his standing commissions. He would remain there until his death, sixteen years later. He continued to send the occasional painting back to Saint Petersburg and was awarded the title of "Academician" in 1857.

== Orlov's artistic legacy ==
Orlov's paintings, which drew the praise of his contemporaries, are noted for their softness and beauty of colour, along with the efficacy of the lighting and the thoroughness of the finish. Most of his works are portraits and genre scenes from the life of Italians, but there are also works on historical subjects and landscapes.

Most of Pimen's works remained in Italy and are in the private collections of Western European collectors. However, in Russia they were also in demand - the paintings "Young Roman Girl at the Fountain", "Italian Morning" were bought by Emperor Nicholas I.

Currently, Orlov's paintings are represented in many museums in Russia and CIS countries - Tretyakov Gallery, Tver Regional Picture Gallery, Transcarpathian Regional Art Museum named after Y. Bokshaya (Ukraine) and others.

== Selected paintings ==
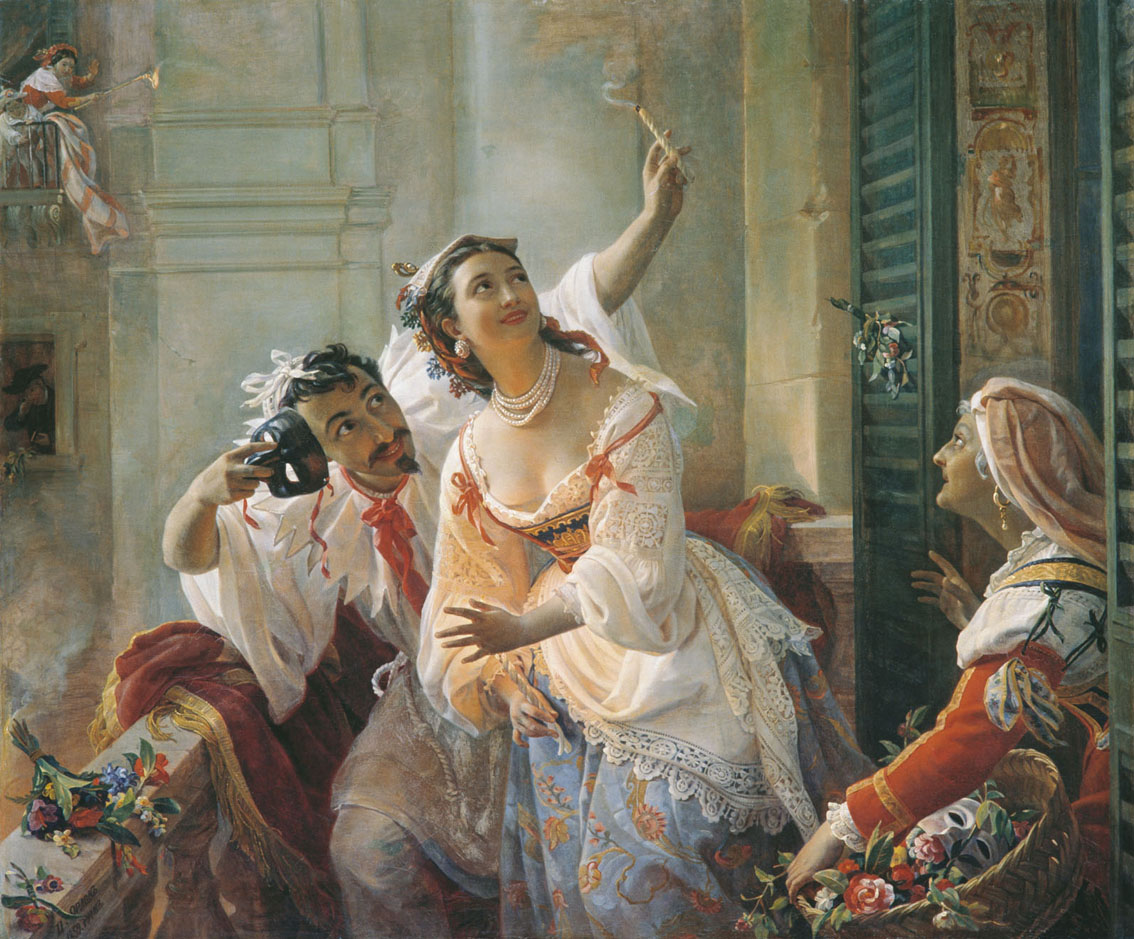
Scene from the Roman Carnival

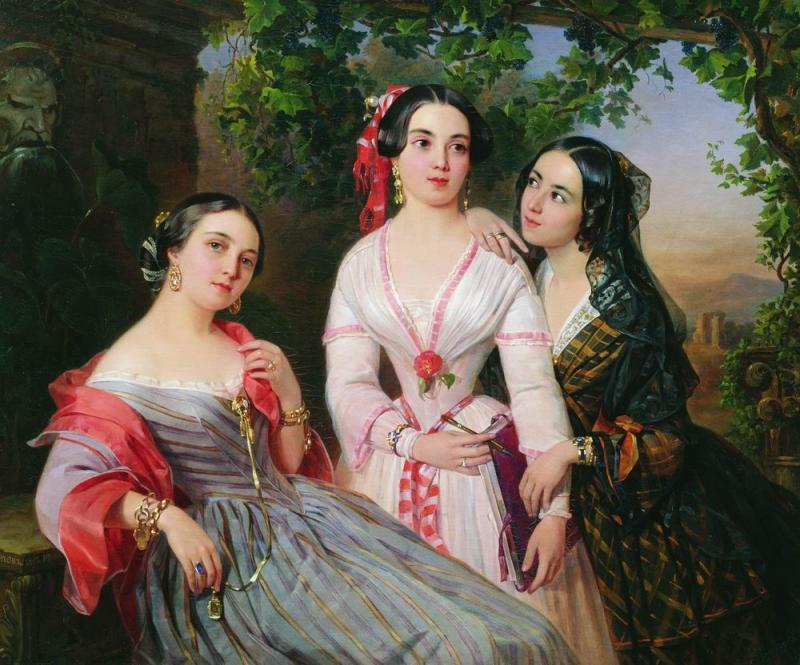
The Sukhovo-Kobylin Sisters

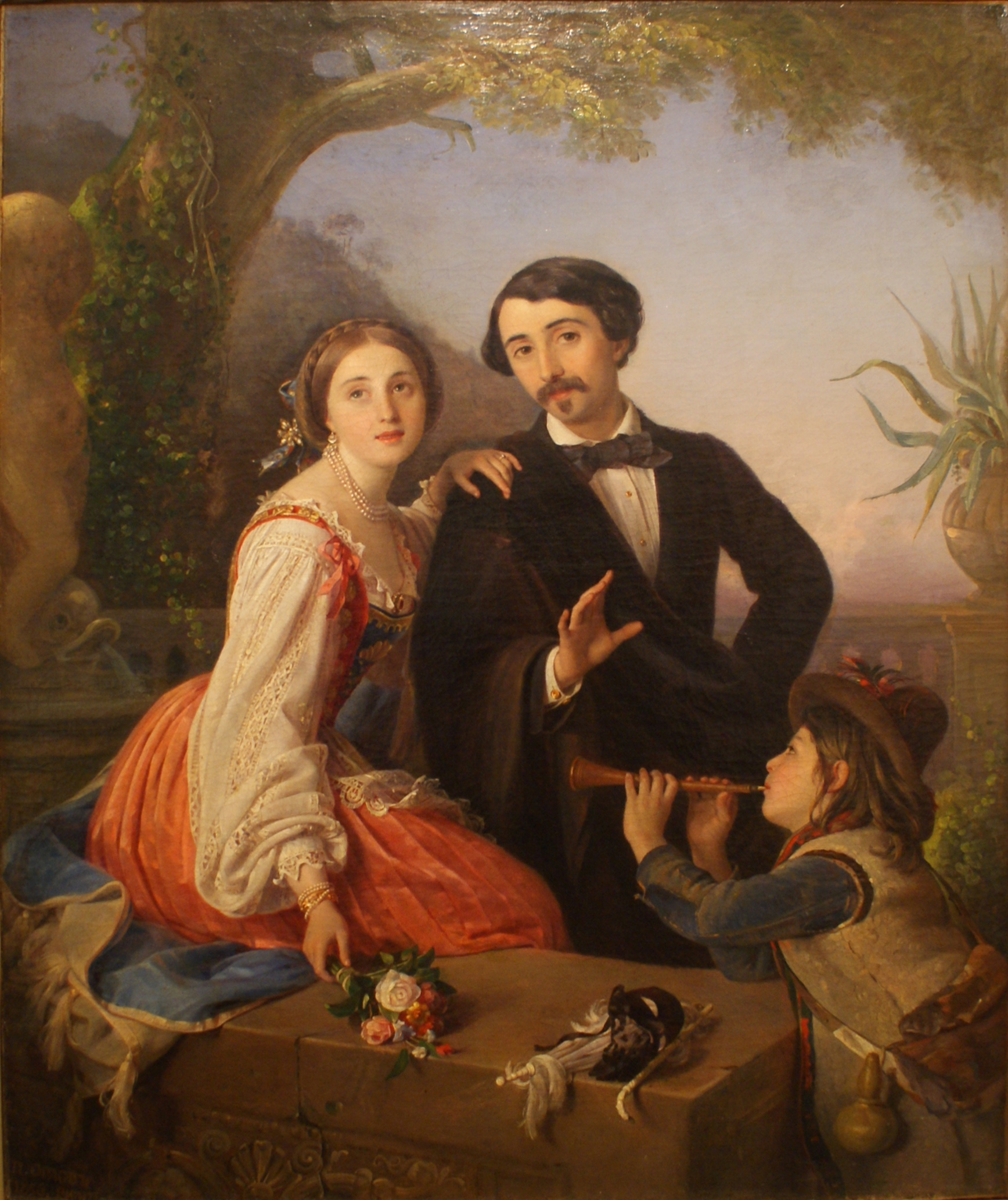
A.I. Loris-Melikov
and his family

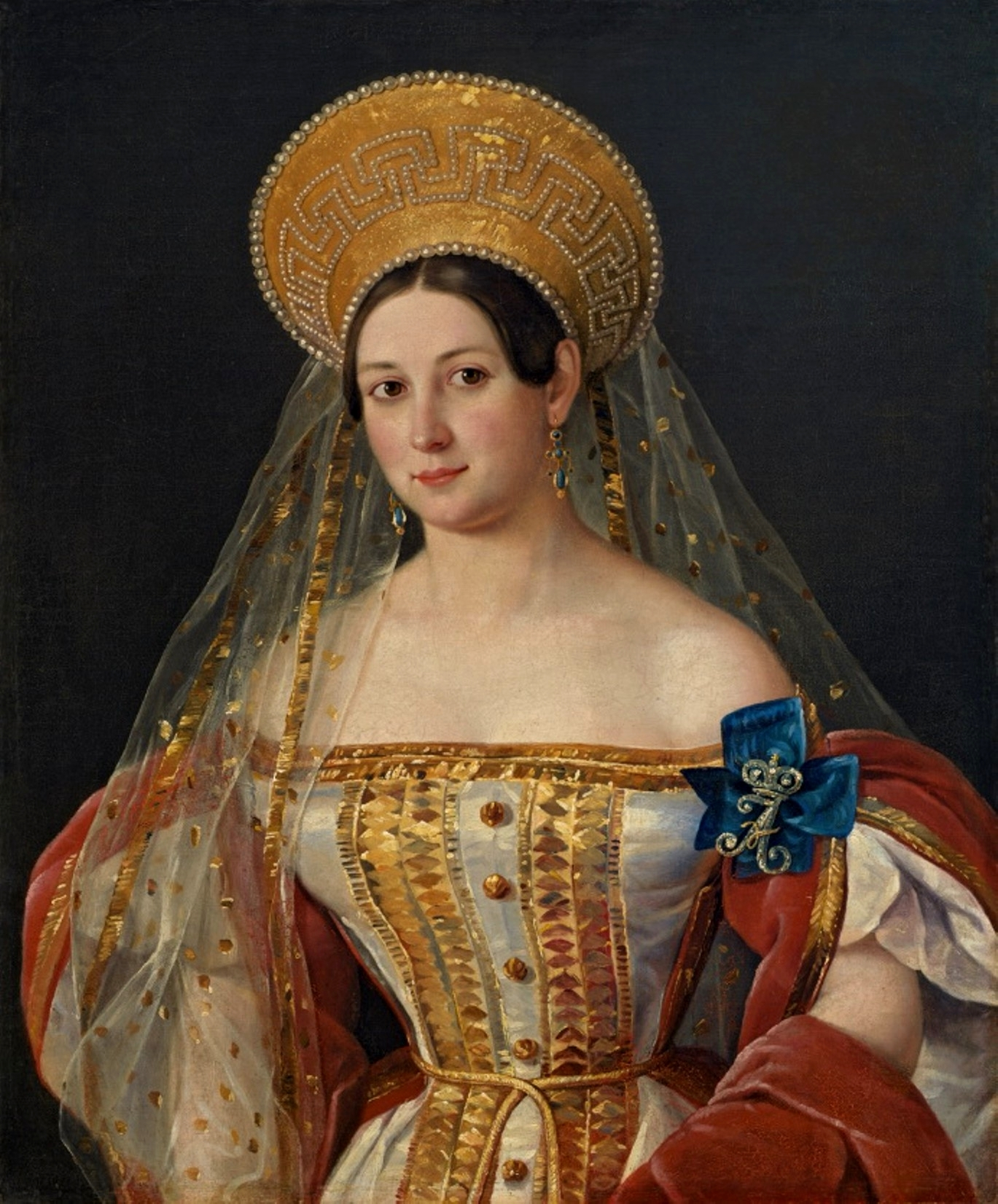
Portrait of the Maid-of-Honour Sophia Orlova-Denisova

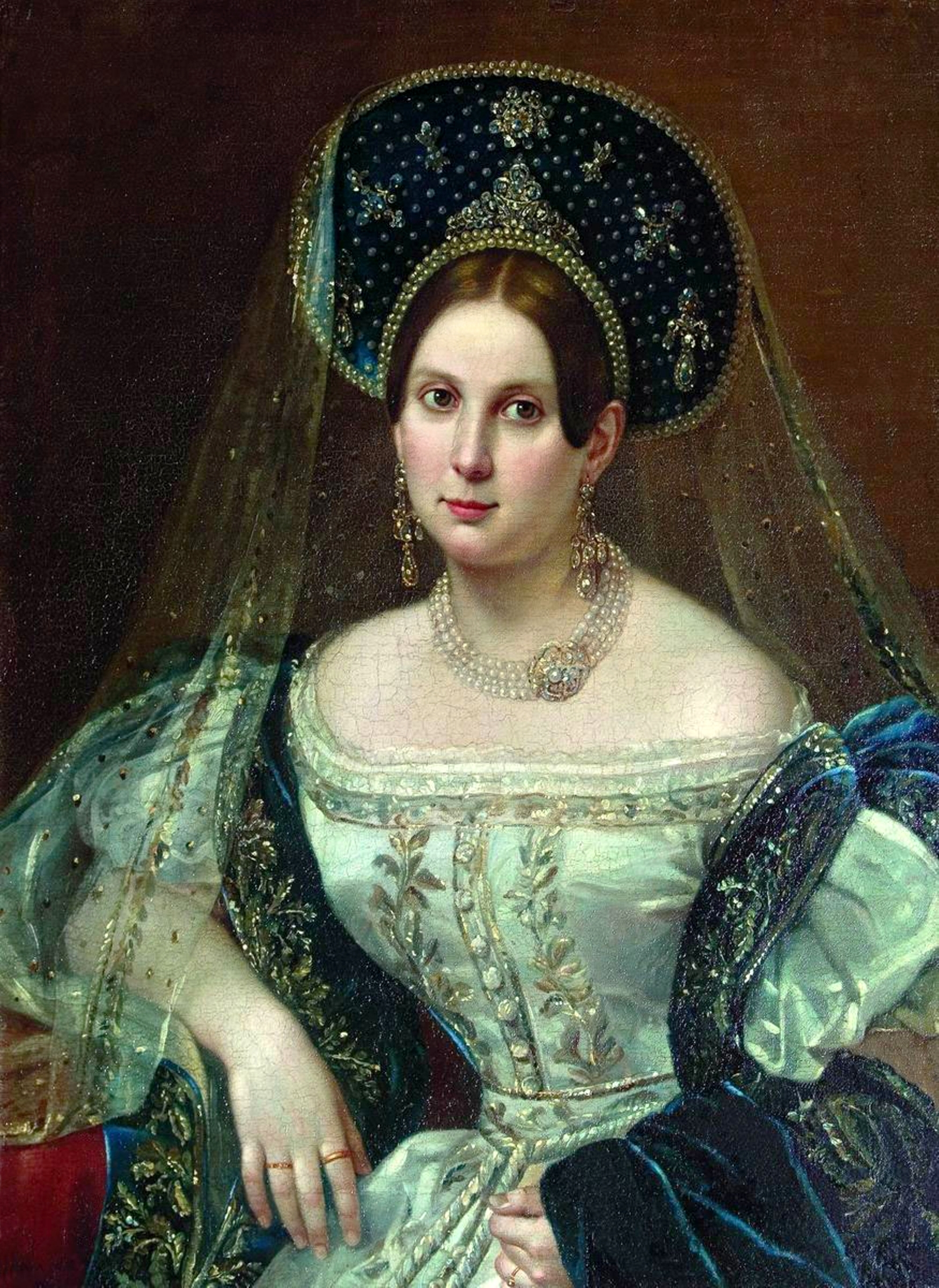
Portrait of an Unknown in a Court Old Russian Dress.

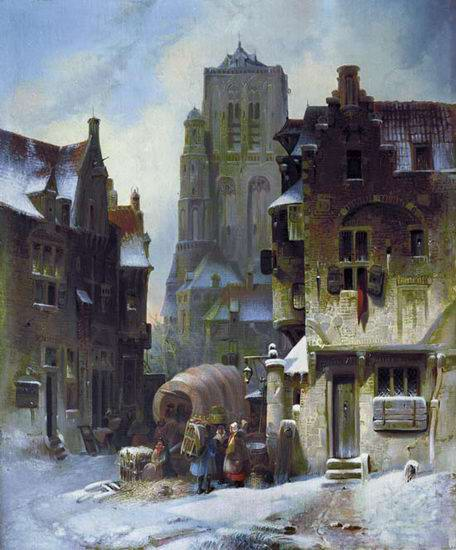
Architectural landscape
