= Kobryn castles =

Former castles in Kobryn, Belarus

- Kobryn, Belarus
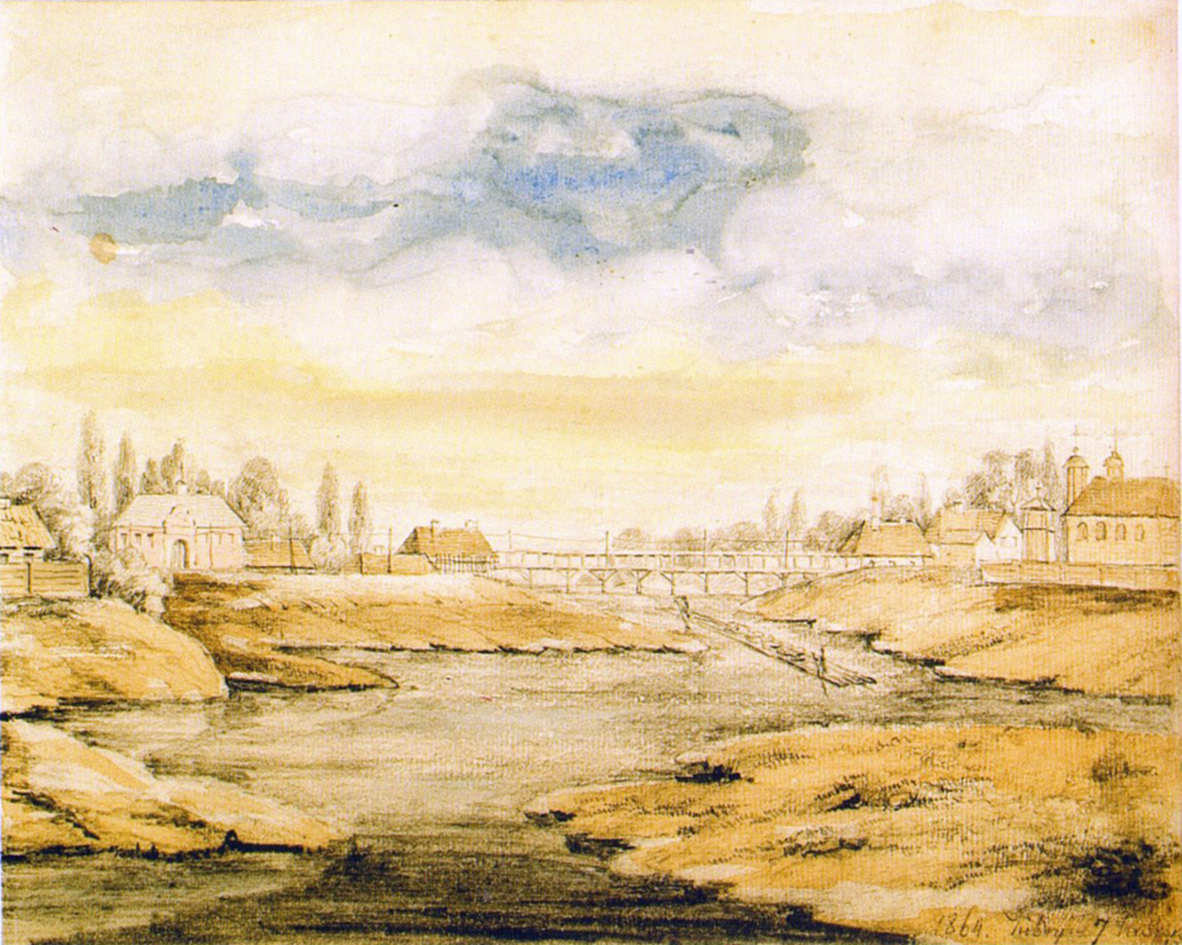
- The location of the former Kobryn castles. (by Napoleon Orda, Kobryn, 1864)

Site information
- Condition: Not preserved

Location
- Coordinates: 52.2145°N 24.3610°E

Site history
- Built: c. 11th century
- Materials: wood and soil
- Demolished: In the 19th century

Kobryn castles were a complex of wooden defense and administrative structures that existed in the city of Kobryn in the 16th–18th centuries. Presumably, the first Kobryn castle (detinets) was founded in the 11th century by the heirs of the Kiev prince Izyaslav on the island at the confluence of the Kobrinka and Mukhavets rivers. The remaining earth embankments were dismantled in the 1880s when laying the Moscow–Warsaw chaussee.

== Characteristics ==
The appearance of castles and their equipment can be established basing on their 16th century inventories. The fortifications consisted of the Lower Castle ("hillock") Castle and the Upper (High) Castle. The entrance to the Lower Castle was blocked by Kobrinka River. A bridge was built across the river, the last span of which was lifting. On both sides the bridge ended with gate towers. The Lower Castle was protected by 5 towers, gorodnyas and a parkan. In one of the towers there was a mill.

The Upper Castle was separated from the Lower by a moat. The bridge over the moat rested against the tower-gate of the Upper Castle. The last span of the bridge was also lifted. In the Upper Castle there were also 5 towers (with gates), gorodnyas and parkan. On them there were platforms with eaves covered with shingles. All the towers were covered with shingles.

According to the inventory of 1597, the castle's artillery consisted of 2 cannons and 5 serpentines. Of small arms there were 16 gakovnitsas, 17 hand cannons and 2 cues.

== Sources ==
- Yakimovich, Yuri (1978). Wooden architecture of the Belarusian Polesye.
- Yatskevich, Dmitry (2005). Grand Duchy of Lithuania (encyclopedia). Belarusian Encyclopedia named after Petrus Brovka. ISBN 985-11-0378-0.
