= Ivan Vasilyev =

Russian explorer and navigator

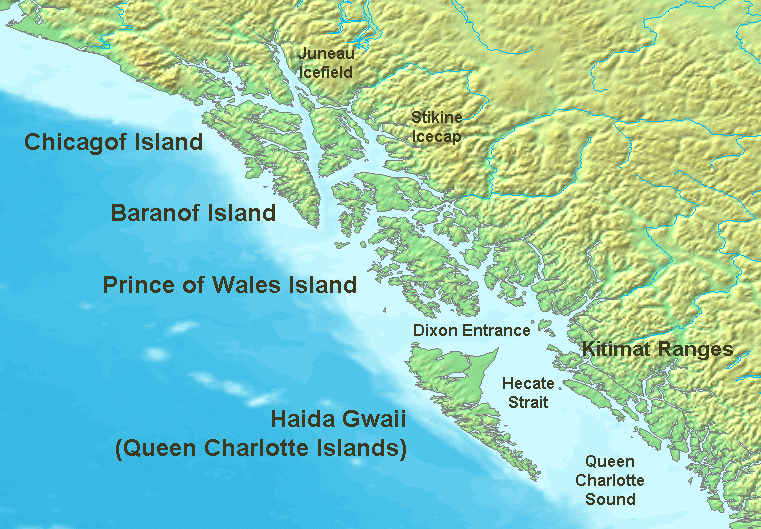
Islands of the Pacific Northwest Coast

Ivan Filippovich Vasiliev (Vasilyev, Vasil'ev) (1776 – July 1812) (referred to in some records as "Ivan Vasiliev the First") was a Russian explorer and navigator of the Imperial Russian Navy. He accompanied Leonty Andrianovich Hagemeister (1780–1833) on ship Neva to explore the coasts of Alaska and the North Pacific in 1806.

Vasiliev explored the Alexander Archipelago and the many coastal Islands in the area. In 1809 he surveyed the western shore of Baranof Island.

Ivan F. Vasiliev should not be confused with explorer Mikhail Vasilyev (1770–1847) or with another navigator named Ivan Yakovlevich (Iakovlevich) Vasiliev (Vasil'ev) (1797 - died after 1838). Krusenstern says this about Ivan Filippovich Vasiliev:

It is much to be regretted that the hydrographic works of a naval officer, Vasilief, who was in the employment of the American Company, were lost... Provided with a sextant and chronometer and with much zeal and attachment for his profession, he had during his sojourn in our American colonies made a complete survey of all of the Aleutian Islands without having had specific instructions to do so. Unfortunately he was drowned in Okhotsk harbor on his return from America to Russia, and what became of his precious papers and drawings is unknown...

Ivan F. Vasiliev's name is spelt "Vasilief" in the United States, where he is also known as "Ivan Vasiliev the First", in order to differentiate him from other Russian mariners and early explorers of Alaska also named "Vasiliev".

Vasilief Bank close to Sitka and Vasilief Rock in Kodiak Island were named after him. There are other geographic features in the coast of Alaska and the Aleutians bearing the name "Vasilief", but it is not clear after which Vasiliev they were named.
