= Nadezhda Borisovna Trubetskaya =

Russian noblewoman and courtier

- Nadezha Troubetskaya circa 1890s
- Born: Princess Nadezhda Borisovna Svyatopolk-Chetvertinskaya; 20 October 1812
- Died: 23 February 1909 (aged 96); Moscow, Russian Empire
- Noble family: Czetwertyński
- Spouse: Alexey Ivanovich Trubetskoy
- Issue: Natalya Alekseevna Trubetskaya; Alexei Alexeevich Trubetskaya
- Father: Boris Antonovich Chetvertinsky
- Mother: Nadezhda Feodorovna Gagarina

Nadezhda Borisovna Trubetskaya (20 October 1812 – 23 February 1909), was a Russian noblewoman and courtier. She was noted for her philanthropy, and was one of the most known philanthropists in 19th-century Russia, contributing to 40 charity organizations in care for orphans, the homeless and the Red Cross, as well as the medical care during the Russo-Turkish War (1877–78), for which she became famous.

== Biography ==
Nadezha was born into the large family of Prince Boris Antonovich Chetvertinsky, a veteran of the Napoleonic Wars, and Nadezhda Feodorovna Gagarina. Her relatives were closely tied to the imperial family. Her aunt, Maria Naryshkina, was a longtime mistress of Alexander I, and another, Zhanetta Chetvertinskaya, nearly became the morganatic wife of Grand Duke Konstantin Pavlovich.

The family spent a lot of time at the Filimonki estate, where their numerous relatives gathered. Nadezhda's maternal aunts, Vera Vyazemskaya and Sofia Ladomirskaya, and their children often stayed at the estate. Nadezhda moved in refined circles since childhood, due to her family's connections.

She received an excellent education at home and later attended university. In 1831, she was accepted to the court as a maid of honour to Empress Alexandra Feodorovna, and three years later, in 1834, she became the wife of Prince Alexei Ivanovich Trubetskoy (1806-1855) who would later become the Vilnius vice-governor, chamberlain, and actual state councillor. Fellow maid of honour, A. S. Sheremetev wrote in April 1834:

"I saw Princess Trubetskaya née Chetvertinskaya, and her husband. I find him very awkward; I was very sorry to see them together; he is so out of place! She introduced herself to the Empress, who found her particularly charming."

The Trubetskoy House on Znamensky Lane became one of Moscow's cultural centres, a literary salon. Princess Trubetskaya surrounded herself with the best minds of the time. At the home of her uncle, the poet Pyotr Vyazemsky, she met Alexander Pushkin, Vasily Zhukovsky, and Nikolai Gogol. Later, Trubetskaya told her great-grandson about dancing with Pushkin and his visits to the Chetvertinsky house.

Nadezhda Trubetskaya's final years were marred by tragedy. Her son, Alexei, embezzled state funds, his mother was then forced to sell all her property, including her hosue on Znamensky lane. The Trubetskoy's financial affairs, disrupted by their charitable activities, left Nadezhda Borisovna penniless. For her services, she was awarded a pension from the Brotherly Society she organized, and given a rented apartment in her former home, purchased by Sergei Shchukin.

Nadezhda Borisovna Trubetskaya died on 23 February 1909.

== Charity ==
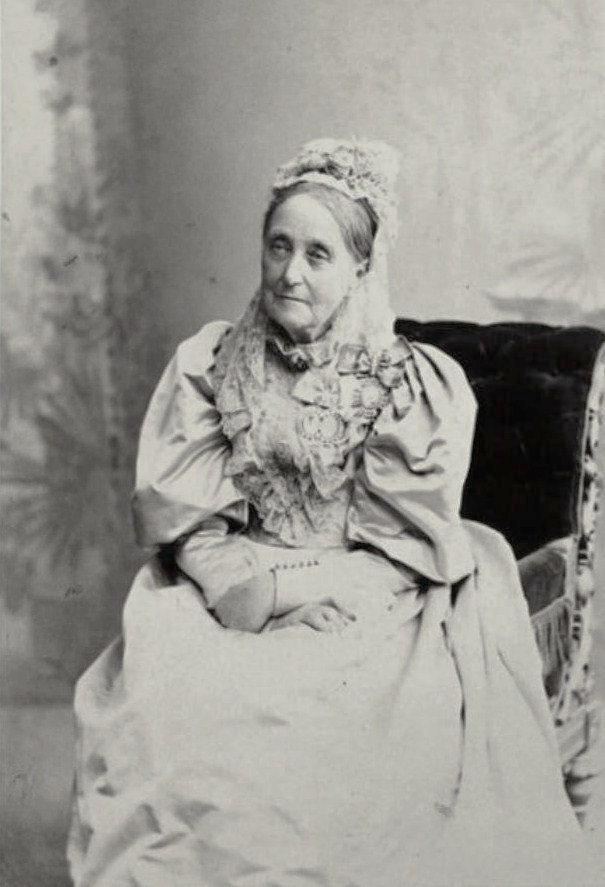
N. B.Troubetskay

According to Boris Chicherin, Princess Trubetskaya was "an intelligent, lively, lively woman with character, with intellectual interests, a constant attendee of university lectures, and at the same time devoted to charity, who headed many institutions, which she managed with tact and skill."

From 1842, Nadezhda Borisovna served on the Council of Orphanages, and in 1844, with the assistance of Stepan Nechayev, she organised the Olginsky Orphanage. After her husband's death in 1855, Princess Trubetskaya devoted all her time to charity.

During the winter of 1859/60, the homes of some poor residents were at risk of flooding. Nadezhda, her mother, sister, and several other aristocrats rented a house near the Kaluga Gate, where they relocated these residents. In 1861, with the active participation of Nadezhda Borisovna, the "Brotherly Society for the Provision of Housing to the Indigent" was founded. This organisation belonged to the "Imperial Philanthropic Society", where one could obtain an apartment or rental assistance. Under the princess' chairmanship, by the turn of the 20th century, the society had 40 charitable institutions under it's administration. Empress Maria Feodorovna became the patron of the society, and Grand Duchess Elizaveta Feodorovna became honorary chairperson.

In 1865, Trubetskaya became a trustee of the Arbat branch of the Ladies' Guardianship of the Poor. In August of that year, with the participation of engineer Christian Meyen and entrepreneur Pyotr Gubonin, the committee opened a small vocational school for boys, where children were taught tailoring, shoemaking, and bookbinding. On 17 Aoruk 1866, the school was renamed Komissarov Technical Schoolin honour of the Osip Komissarov who saved the Emperor from an assasintaion attempt.

In 1877, with the ourbreak of the Russo-Turkish War, Trubetskaya organised a hospital train and, as a nurse, went to the front at the age of 65.

In 1879, Nadezha Borisovna organised financial assistance to the city of Orenburg, which had suffered damage as a result of fire, and she personally delivered essential items to the city.

In her later years, Princess Trubetskaya was a member of the Board of Trustees of the Kseninsky Children's Orphanage, which she founded in Khamovninki and named in honour of Grand Duchess Xenia Alexandrovna.

For her efforts, Nadezha was awarded the Order of Saint Catherine, Small Cross.

== Marriage and Issue ==
On 18 Fenruary 1834 Nadezhda Borisovna married Prince Alexei Ivanovich Trubetskoy (1806-1855), son of Prince Ivan Nikolaevich Trubetskoy (1760-1843) by his wife Natalia Sergeevna (1775-1852) née Princess Meshcherskaya. They had two children:

- Natalia Alekseevna (12 January 1835, Moscow - 1918), baptised on 22 January 1835 in the Church of Boris and Gleb on Povarskaya sponsored by her granfather Prince Ivan Trubetskoy and her grand mother. Princess Nadezhda Chetvertinskaya. She married Prince Nikolai Ivanovich Shakovsky (1823-1890), their granddaughter is the writer Zinaida Shakhovskaya
- Alexei Alexeevich (1847 - 4 July 1914), married Natalia Dmitrievna Vsevolozhskaya (1856 - 1 March 1913) on 16 August 1876, he died in Paris from progressive general paralasis.
