= Mikhail Bulatov =

Russian military officer

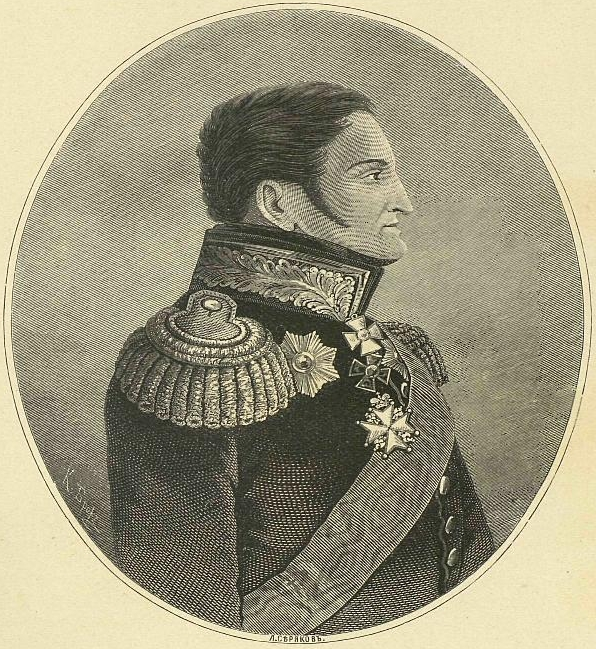
Bulatov in 1812

Mikhail Leontievich Bulatov (Russian: Михаил Леонтьевич Булатов; 1760, in Ryazan – 2 May 1825, in Omsk) was a Russian military officer who fought during the Russo-Turkish War (1787–1792) and became major general in 1799 during the Napoleonic Wars and lieutenant-general in 1823.
