= Charles de Lambert (soldier) =

French general soldier (1773–1843)

Count Charles-Marie de Lambert
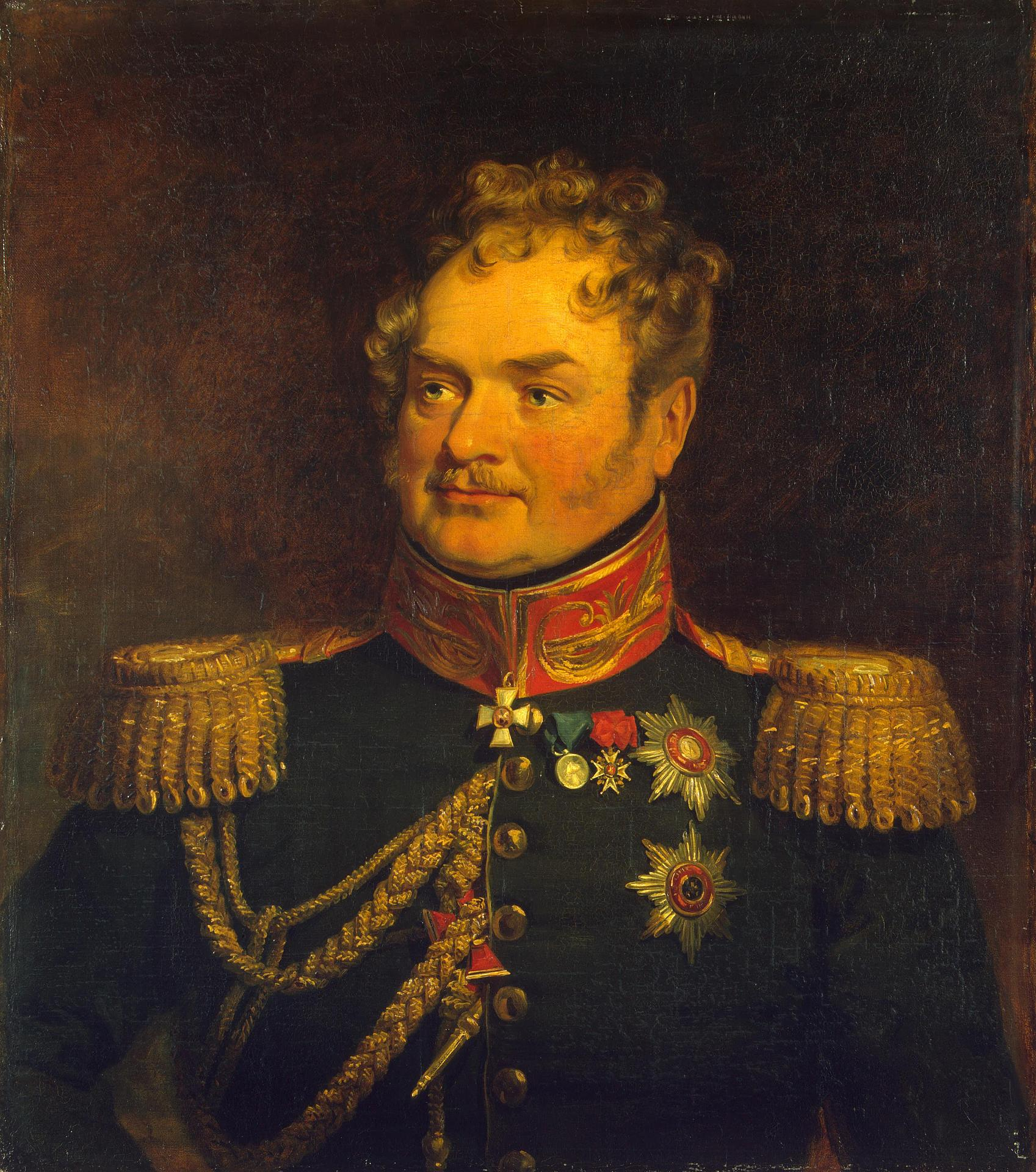
- Portrait by George Dawe (1820–1825)
- Born: 1773
- Died: 1843 (aged 69–70)
- Military career
- Allegiance: Kingdom of France; Armée des Émigrés; Russian Empire
- Service years: 1790–1824
- Rank: General
- Conflicts: Kościuszko Uprising; Persian Expedition of 1796; Napoleonic Wars; Invasion of Russia; Battle of Nowo Schwerschen; Battle of Kaidanowo; Battle of Borisov (WIA); Minor campaigns of 1815
- Awards: Order of St. Anna; Order of St. George; Order of St. Vladimir; Order of St. Alexander Nevsky

Count Charles-Marie de Lambert (Russian: Карл Осипович Ламберт, romanized: Karl Osipovich Lambert; 15 June 1773 – 30 May 1843) was a French royalist general who fought for Russia during the Napoleonic Wars.

== Life ==
After his brother Maurice's death, Catherine II of Russia invited Charles and his father (who had already left France) to join the Russian Army in honour of Maurice's bravery. In 1793 he joined the Kinburn Dragoon Regiment to help put down the Kościuszko Uprising. He and his father fought in the battle on the Matsiovitsa Hill and the assault on the heavily fortified Praga suburb of Warsaw and rose to commander and lieutenant colonel. He was granted the Order of St George 4th class on 1 January 1795.

In 1796 he fought in the Persian campaign under Valerian Zubov's command at the head of a cossack regiment. On returning from Persia he transferred to the Strarodubov Cuirassier Regiment. He rose to colonel in 1798 but left the army because of illness the same year. The following year he returned to the Starodubov Regiment under Alexander Rimsky-Korsakov's command on its departure for Switzerland and the War of the Second Coalition. He was wounded at the Second Battle of Zurich and rose to general and commander of the Riazan Cuirassier Regiment. In 1800 the regiment was disbanded but he was given the right to continue wearing its uniform.

Alexander I's accession allowed him to take command of the 3rd Elizavetgrad Guards Hussar Regiment in 1802. He took part in the War of the Fourth Coalition and fought against the French at Blonav and on 23 December [O.S. 11 December] 1806 at Tchanow near Modlin. He was before Alexander Ostermann-Tolstoy's corps and repulsed all the French assaults, keeping his unit together and finally carrying out a bayonet charge, though he himself was wounded in the arm. He was granted the Order of St George 3rd class on 31 January 1807.

At Pultusk and Eylau he was put in command of three dragoon regiments and two hussar regiments. He was then given the Order of St Vladimir 3rd class. At Friedland he saved two captured batteries, for which he was given the Order of St Anne 1st class. On 30 August 1811 he was made adjutant general and put in command of the 5th Cavalry Division, with which he became part of Alexander Tormasov's occupation force in 1812. He retired to Konstantinograd in Poltava Governorate, where he died on 30 May 1843. His epitaph read: "died of exhaustion from musket balls and of old age".

== Sources ==
- "Ламберт, Карл Осипович". Русский биографический словарь — Т. 10 — Лабзина — Ляшенко. Русский биографический словарь. 1914. pp. 50–51.
