= Napoleon's Hill =

Coordinates: 54°51′43″N 23°55′34″E

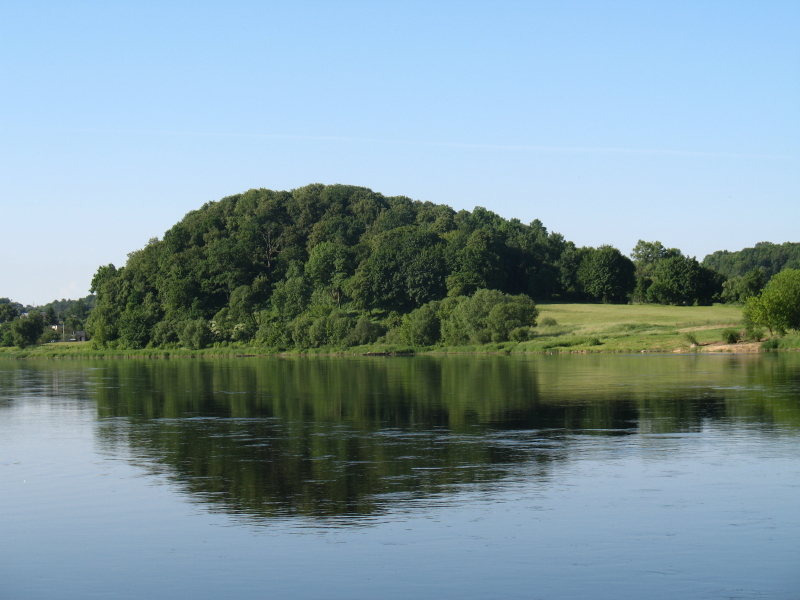
Napoleon's hill

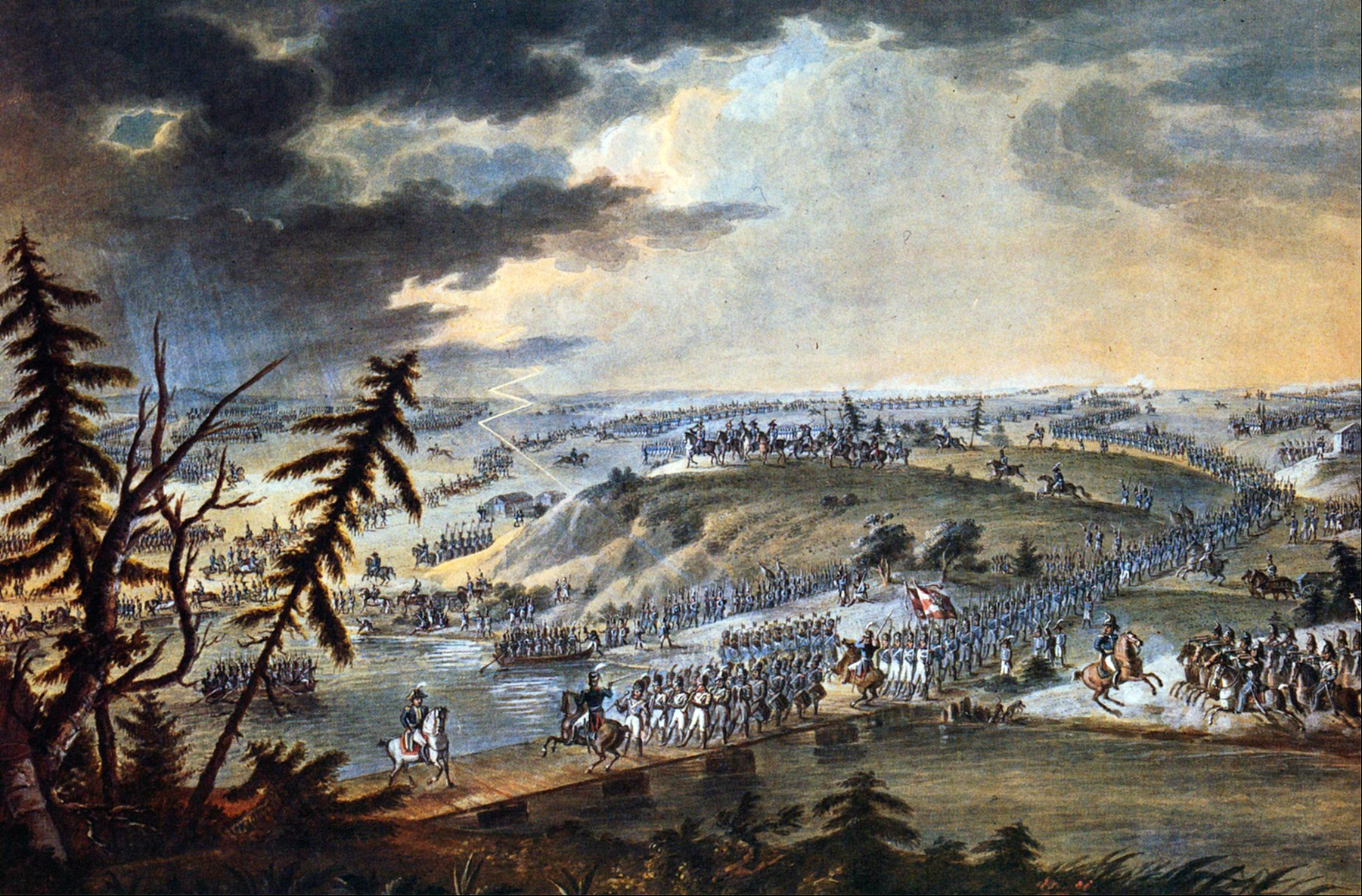
Anonymous, "Grande Armée" crossing of the Nemunas River

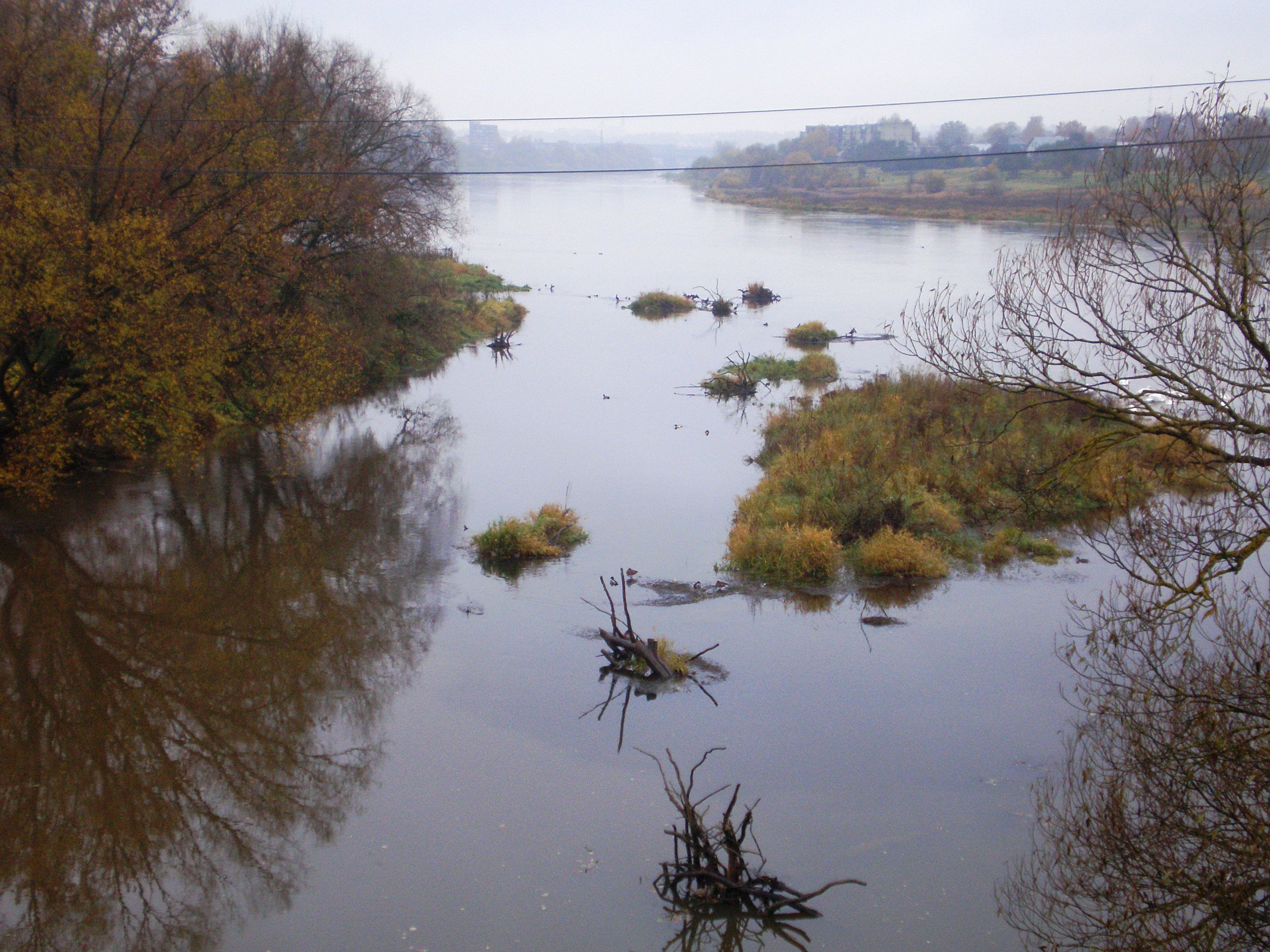
Confluence of Jiesia and Niemen river

Napoleon's hill, actually Jiesia (Pajesys) hill fort mound is located in Kaunas, Lithuania, on the left bank of the Nemunas, between the Panemunė and Railway bridges. It is 63.3 meters high. Since the 19th century, it has been named Napoleon's hill.

From this hill, Napoleon Bonaparte watched his Grande Armée crossing the Neman during the French invasion of Russia on 24/25 June 1812; according to his orders two bridges were built to the left of the Jiesia and one in front of the hill, each 300 m apart.

According to the memoirs of contemporaries, on 23 June 1812. Napoleon Bonaparte arrived at the Nemunas River, near Panemunė, where the 6th Polish cavalry regiment was stationed. Wearing a colonel's "surtout" and hat, the commander reconnoitred the river from Panemunė to Aleksotas. The Grand Army Bridge Construction Unit was led by General Jean-Baptiste Eblé. He was ordered to build three bridges across the Nemunas, 300 metres apart. Two of them were to be built between the Panemunė and the Jiesia river, and one to the left of the river, opposite the hill from which the Emperor chose to command the crossing. At 10 p.m., the operation to cross the Nemunas began.

== See also ==
- List of hillforts in Lithuania

== Sources ==
- "Napoleono kalnas" (in Lithuanian).
- https://keturiossostines.lt/en/objektas/jiesios-piliakalnis-su-gyvenviete-vadinamas-napoleono-kalnu
