= Battle of Gorodechno =

1812 battle during the French invasion of Russia

- Part of the French invasion of Russia
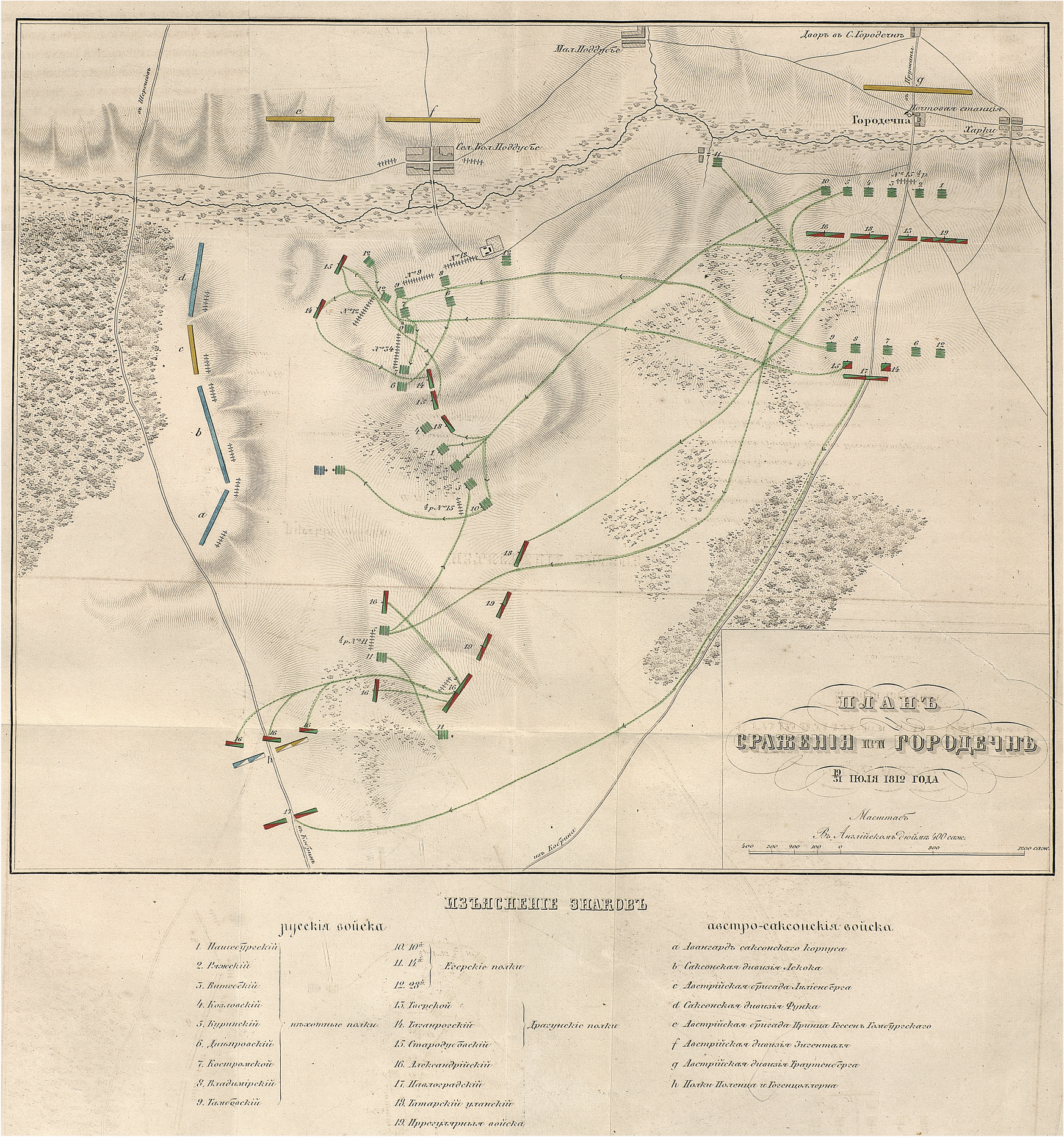
- Plan of the Battle of Gorodechno
Date	12 August 1812
Location	Gorodechno, Russian Empire 52°25′25.37″N 24°18′35.92″E
Result	French Allied victory

Belligerents
Russian Empire	Austrian Empire; Kingdom of Saxony

Commanders and leaders
(Russian Empire) Alexander Tormasov	(Austrian Empire) Prince of Schwarzenberg; Jean Reynier

Strength
18,000	40,000

Casualties and losses
3,000	1,300 Austrians; 930 Saxons

French invasion of Russia
current battle
Prussian corps
Napoleon
Austrian corps

The Battle of Gorodechno took place between an army of the Austrian and Saxon allies of Napoleonic France under the overall command of the Prince of Schwarzenberg and Russian troops under Alexander Tormasov at Gorodechno, a town in Kobrinsky Uyezd, Grodno Governorate (now Pruzhany District, Brest Region in Belarus). The battle was ultimately won by France's allies when Tormasov was forced to retire.

== Background ==
In July 1812, France's Austrian and Saxon allies were given orders to move into Russia on the right flank of Napoleon's Grande Armée as it drove toward Moscow. The allied force was composed of 30,000 Austrians under the command of Schwarzenberg and 13,000 Saxons under the command of General Jean Reynier. Operating in that area for the Russians was Tormasov leading a force of 40,000 on a mission to move about behind Napoleon's forces disrupting activities and communications. During July, the Russians successfully defended Kobryn and send troops north to Pruzhany and Bialystok spreading panic and concern. Ultimately concerned about the allied pursuit, Tormasov retired and took a defensive position without his reserve forces at Gorodechno.

== Battle ==
At daybreak on 12 August 1812, the allies attacked utilizing causeways to cross a marsh behind which Tormasov had established his defensive line and battery. Reynier and the Saxon advance guard composed primarily of cavalry had the greatest success against the Russian defenses as they were able to move across the northern causeway relatively unimpeded and initiate a flank movement on the Russian left. Tormasov quickly shifted his forces to form a new line of defense on his left.

The battle continued throughout the day and included active exchanges of artillery fire. Tormasov and the Russian defenses on the left held strong and kept the allies from enveloping their position. Concurrently Saxon forces shifted part of their focus and attacked the Russian position in the center supported by artillery. The Russians continued to hold strong and the initial allied effort at a breakthrough in the center failed. Toward evening, a battalion of Austrian Colloredo joined the battle at the center after struggling on foot through the marshes. A fight for the high ground took place with the allies gaining a position only to pushed back later by the Russians. Meanwhile, the fighting on the Russian left flank continued only to end in failure for the allies. At the end of the day, the dead and wounded among both the Russians and the allies numbered in the thousands.

Although the Russian defensive position remained intact, that evening Tormasov made the decision to withdraw based upon his belief that the allies would renew the attack in the morning with an additional 21 battalions of fresh troops that had yet to be engaged in the battle.

== Aftermath ==
Schwarzenberg's victory at Gorodechno along with the victory of French General Saint-Cyr over the Russians on the Grande Armée's left flank at Polotsk on 17-18 August gave Napoleon the confidence to continue with his advance toward Moscow responding to all objections with the comment "The wine has been poured, it must now be drunk."

== See also ==
- List of battles of the French invasion of Russia
- Battle of Grodno

== Notes ==
Preceded by Battle of Majadahonda	Napoleonic Wars; Battle of Gorodechno	Succeeded by Battle of Smolensk (1812)
