= First Western Army =

The First Western Army was a field army created in 1810 as part of the reorganisation of the Imperial Russian Army, and was intended as a defense against the north-western part of the Empire from the expected invasion by Napoleon. The total troops in this Army (159,800 men) included 150 battalions, 128 squadrons, 19 Cossack regiments, and 590 guns.

== History ==
The command-in-chief of the First West Army on March 19 [O.S. April 2] 1812 was assigned to General of the Infantry M. B. Barclay de Tolly. However, after arriving 14 (26) April 1812 in Vilno (now Vilnius) at the general headquarters of the First West Army, the Emperor Alexander I became both legally and actually its commander-in-chief, since according to §18 of "Establishments for management of the large acting army", introduced on January 27 (N.S. February 8) 1812, "the presence of Emperor represents the main command authority of the army, unless when specified by an order, the acting commander-in-chief is directed to retain complete authority". There was no such order, therefore, the Emperor assumed command of the army. When on the 7 (19) July 1812 the Emperor left the field army, M. B. Barclay de Tolly again became its commander-in-chief.

== Commanders during the Napoleonic Wars ==
- Commander-in-Chief Emperor Alexander I
- Commander – General of the Infantry M. B. Barclay de Tolly
- Chief of Staff – General Lieutenant N. I. Lavrov until 12 July 1812 (then General Major A. P. Yermolov)
- General-quartermaster – General Major S. A. Mukhin until 11 July 1812 (then Colonel K. W. von Toll)
- Duty General – Fligel-adjutant Colonel P. A. Kikin
- Chief of Artillery – General Major Graf A. I. Kutaysov
- Chief of Engineers – General Lieutenant Kh. I. Truzson
- 1st Infantry Corps General Lieutenant Graf P. Kh. Wittgenstein
- 2nd Infantry Corps General Lieutenant K. G. von Baggovut
- 3rd Infantry Corps General Lieutenant N. A. Tuchkov I
- 4th Infantry Corps General Lieutenant Graf P. A. Shuvalov
- 5th Reserve Guard Corps Tsesarevich Constantine Pavlovich
- 6th Infantry Corps General of the Infantry D. S. Dokhturov
- 1st Cavalry Corps General Adjutant F. P. Uvarov
- 2nd Cavalry Corps General Adjutant Baron F. K. Korff
- 3rd Cavalry Corps General Major Graf P. P. Pahlen III
- Flying Cossack Corps General of the Cavalry M. I. Platov

== See also ==
- Second Western Army
- Third Reserve Army of Observation

== Sources ==
- "La Moskowa: la bataille des Redoutes". F. G. Hourtoulle. Histoire & collections. ISBN 9782908182958
- Napoleon's Invasion of Russia. 1812
