= Second Western Army =

The Second Western Army was created during 1810 as part of the reform of the Imperial Russian Army as a whole and was intended to defend the central western region of the Russian border with Poland (Duchy of Warsaw) to the Austrian border during the expected French invasion of Russia.

== Commanders ==
Commander-in-Chief General of the Infantry Prince P.I. Bagration

Chief of Staff – Major General Graf E.F. de Saint-Priest

General-quartermaster – Major General M.S. Vistitskiy 2nd

Duty General – Fligel-adjutant Colonel S.N. Marin

Chief of Artillery – Major General Baron K.F. Levenshtern

Chief of Engineers – Major General E.Kh. Ferster

- 7th Infantry Corps – Lieutenant General N.N. Raevsky
- 8th Infantry Corps – Lieutenant General M.M. Borozdin
- 4th Cavalry Corps – Major General Graf K.K. Sivers

== Order ==
The total strength of the army was 46 infantry battalions, 52 cavalry squadrons, 9 Cossack regiments, and 180 cannon. The Second Western Army had approximately 45,000−49,423 men, and during the time of June-July, 1812, according to generals Barclay de Tolly, Bagration and Tormasov, was positioned along a 50-mile long front near the areas of Volkovysk and Belostok (now Białystok).

== See also ==
- First Western Army
- Third Reserve Army of Observation
