= French invasion of Russia order of battle =

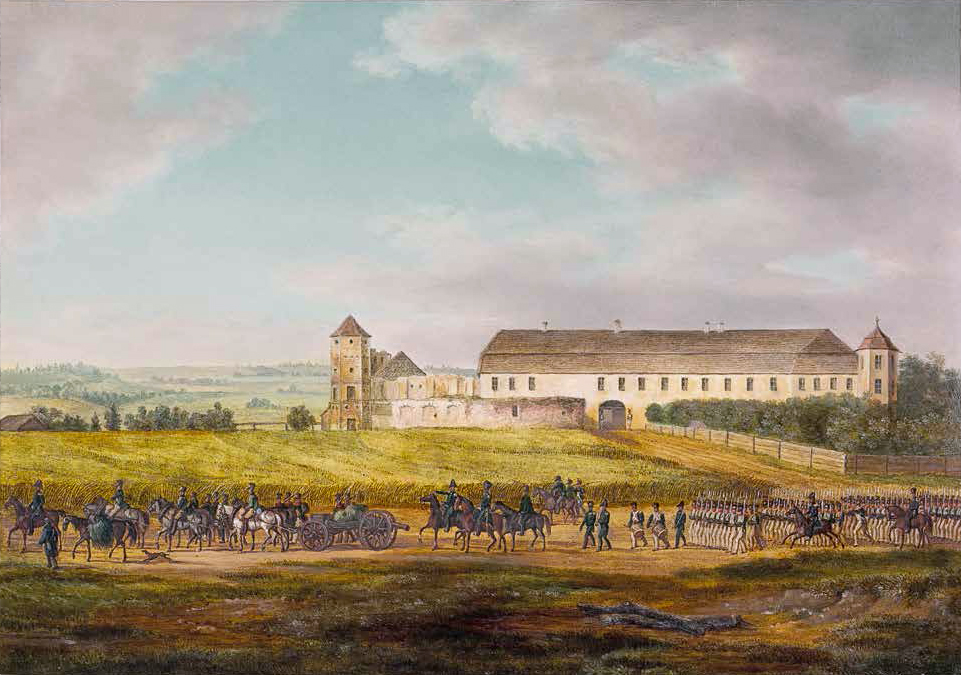
The IV corps under Eugène at Halšany on 11 July 1812. The cavalry, the artillery, the generals, and the drummers, followed by the infantry by Albrecht Adam.

This is the order of battle of the French invasion of Russia.

== Grande Armée ==
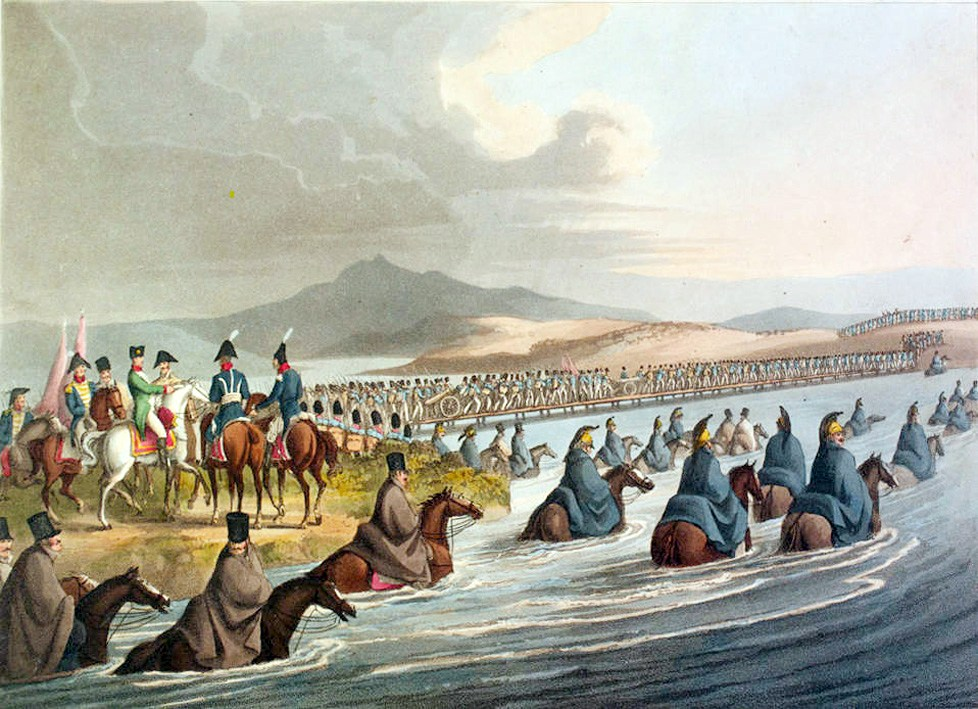
The Grande Armée crossing the Niemen by Waterloo Clark

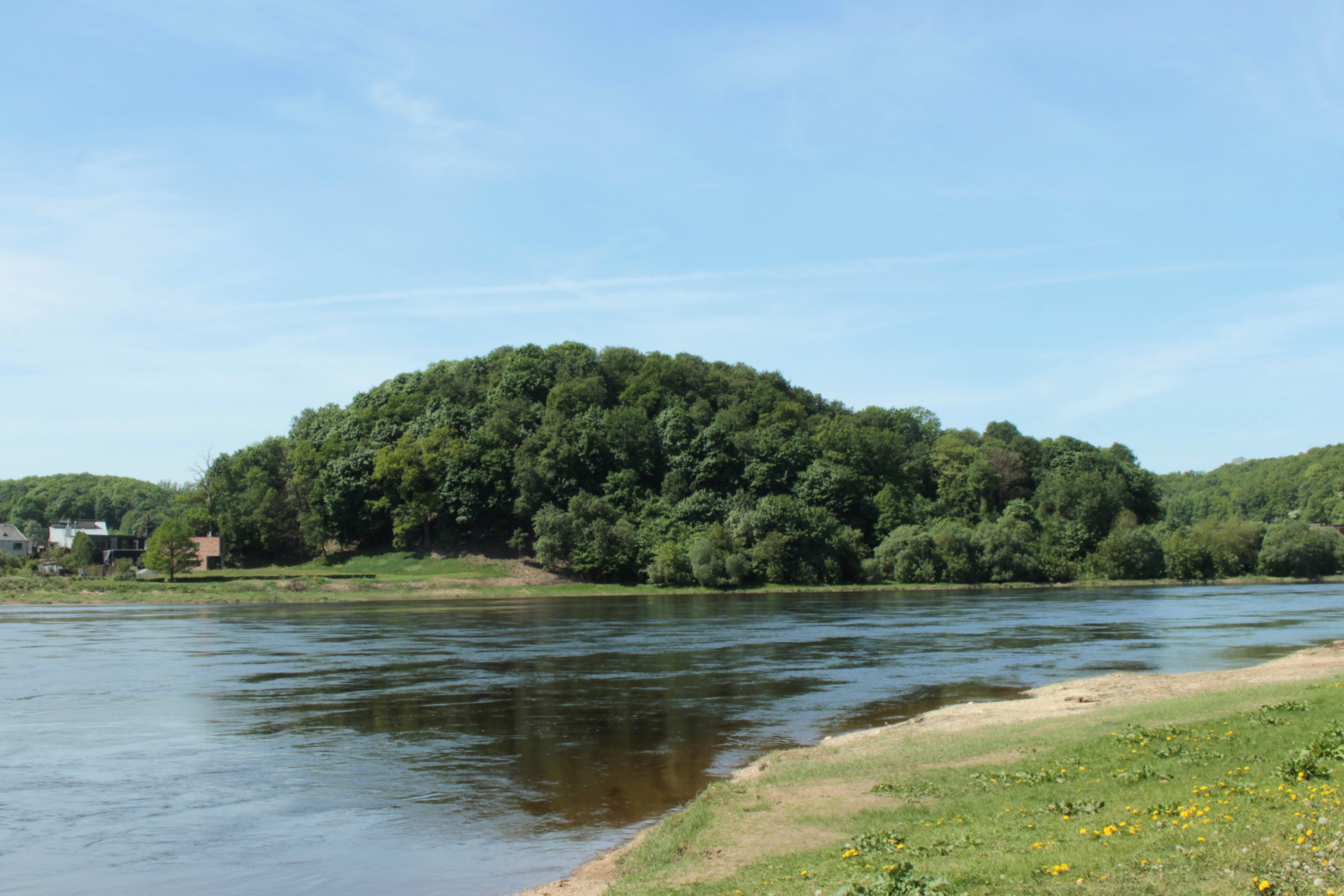
Napoleon's Hill or Jiesia mound from the other bank of the Niemen river

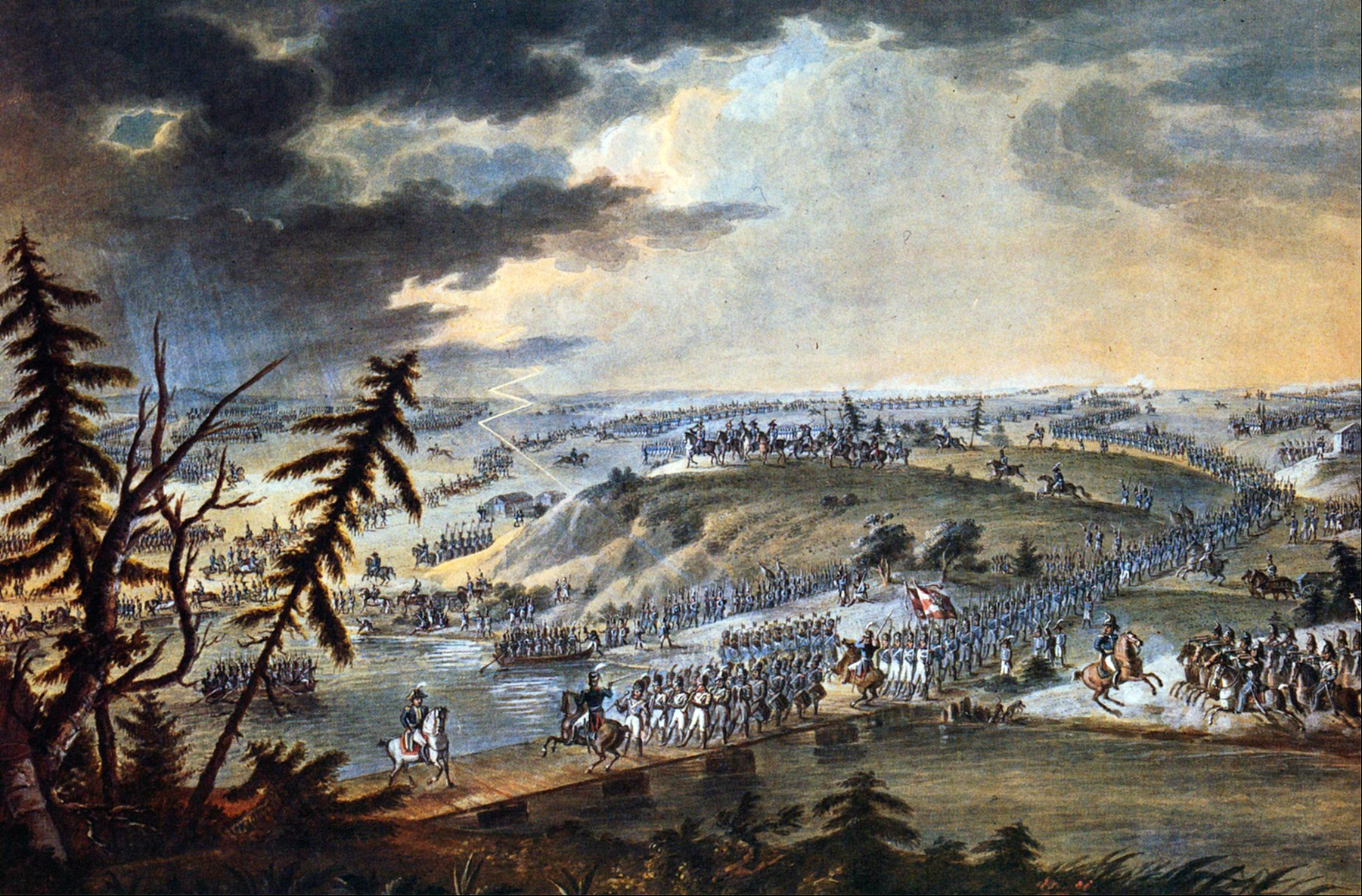
Anonymous, the Grande Armée crossing the river

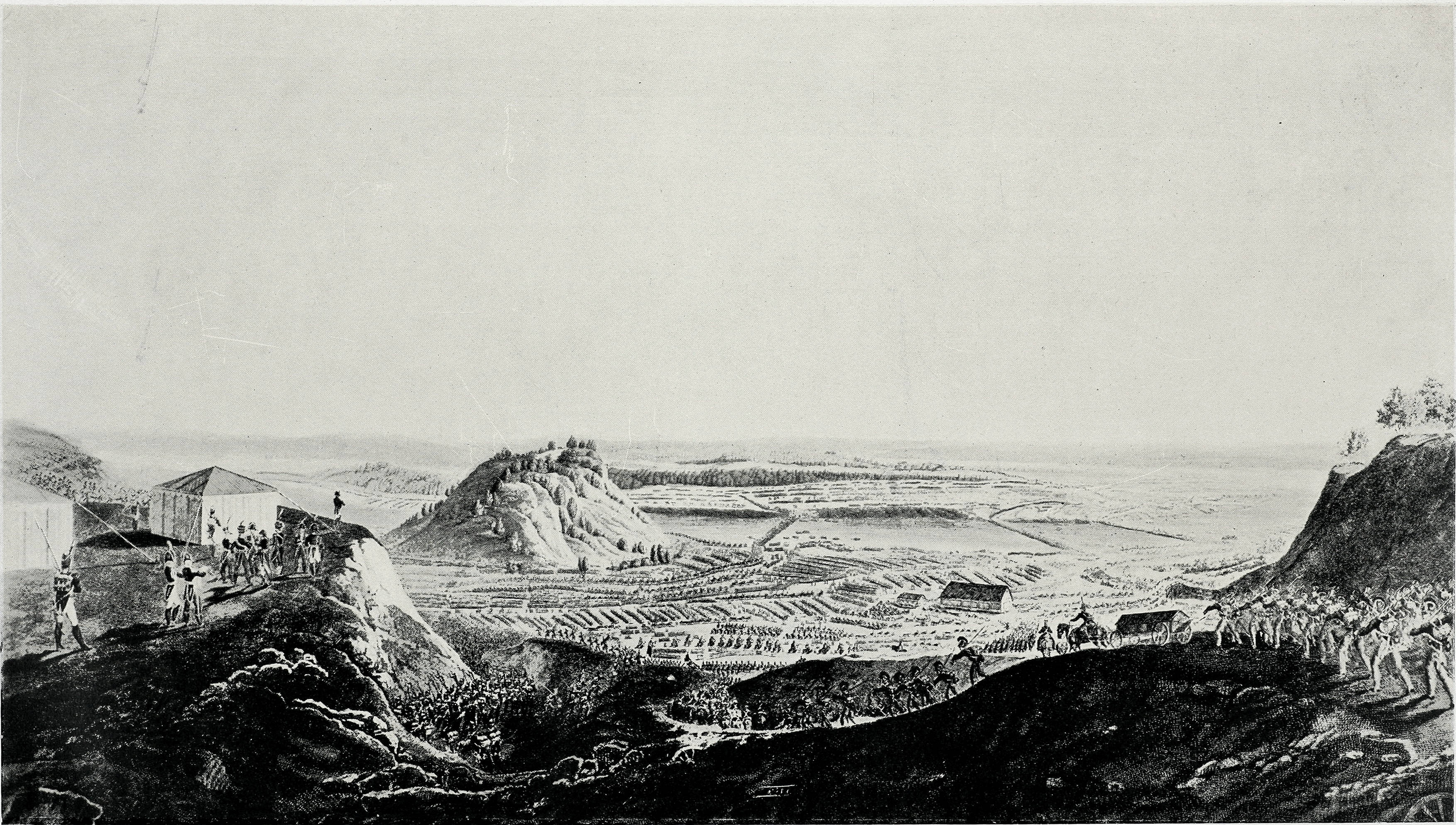
Napoleon's army crossing the Niemen river, starting on 24 June [O.S. 12 June (Julian Calendar)] 1812

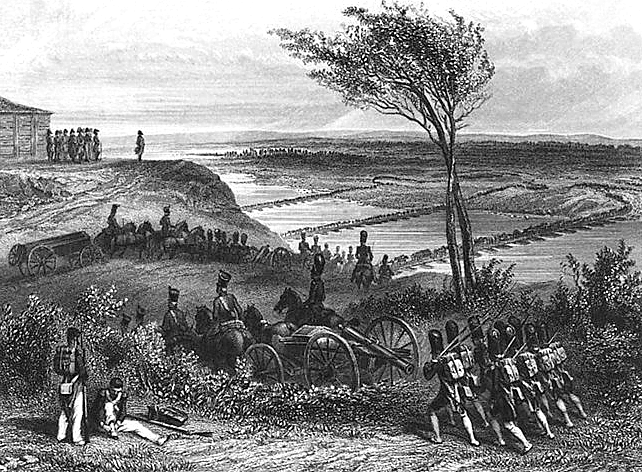
French Army crossing Nieman River 1812 by Auguste Raffet

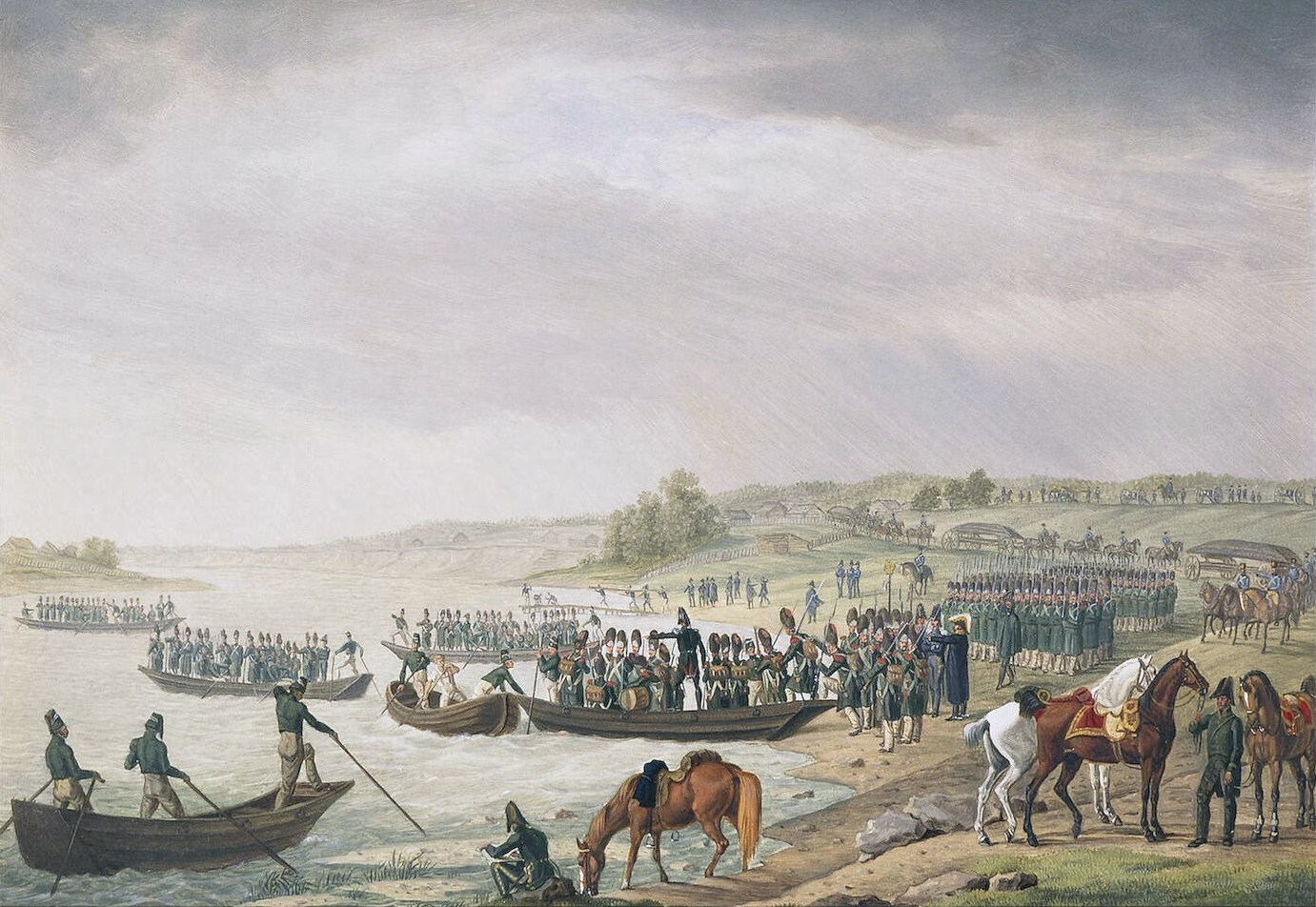
Italian corps of Eugène de Beauharnais crossing the Niemen on 30 June 1812. Oil and gouache on paper by Albrecht Adam. In: Hermitage Museum.

Napoleon organized the Grande Armée, the largest army assembled up to that point in European history. After a whole day of preparation by Morand and Eblé, the invasion commenced on Midsummer, 24 June 1812 with Napoleon's army crossing the river. Half of them were foreigners; Polish legions formed the largest foreign contingent); 120,000 were conscripts. Within a few days, almost half a million men from this multinational army - split up into five columns - crossed the river Neman and entered the Russian Empire. The numbers mentioned below are based on estimates made by Clausewitz, in his book "On War" and not on the estimates in "History of the Consulate and the Empire" by Adolphe Thiers, who wrote that 600,000 men in total were moved but not all of them crossed the Neman. Meanwhile, an analysis of the documents shows that according to the schedules for May 1812, the army had at its disposal 674,024, which include 326,821 soldiers of non-French origin.

Commander-in-Chief: Napoleon Bonaparte; Chief of Staff: Marshal Louis-Alexandre Berthier

=== Northern flank ===
- X Corps (with the Prussian Corps) (30,000) commanded by Marshal Jacques MacDonald. They crossed the Niemen at Tilsit (now Sovetsk) on the 24th. He moved north in Courland but did not succeed in occupying Riga. Early August he occupied Dunaburg; early September he returned to Riga with his entire force. A few days after the French left Lithuania, he drew back to Königsberg, followed by Pyotr Wittgenstein. On 25 December Yorck (von Wartenburg) found himself isolated when the Russian army blocked the road during the retreat. After five days he was urged by his officers (and in the presence of Clausewitz) at least to neutralization of his troops and an armistice. According to Minard, about 6,000 men returned to Poland, according to Clausewitz 5,000 men, but Yorck's resolution had enormous consequences.

=== First Central force ===
Under the Emperor's personal command it crossed the Niemen early in the morning of the 24th on three pontoon bridges (one for the 80,000 horses) nearby Napoleon's Hill. Afterwards, six corps destined for Vilnius or Polotsk hunted after Barclay de Tolly's First Army of the West.

- Imperial Guard (33,000-56,169) commanded by Marshal Jean-Baptiste Bessières (Guard Cavalry); Marshal François Joseph Lefebvre (Old Guard); Marshal Edouard Mortier (Young Guard). The Guard did not take part in the fighting, but during the retreat, the Old Guard was the only unit that retained a semblance of order. The cavalry of the Guard was almost wiped out. About 7,000 Guards succeeded to arrive at the Berezina.
  - Attached to the Young Guard were many multinational units e.g. the Polish Legion of the Vistula under Michel Claparède (7,000), Velites of Turin and Florence, and a Spanish pioneer battalion. Only about 1,500 returned.
  - Grand Quartier, Headquarter's guard, Equipages, Artillery General Park, engineers and other services 14,000 (French, Swiss, Polish, Portuguese) there were attached few multinational units e.g. Portuguese chasseur à cheval, Polish Vistula Uhlan, Neuchâtel (Swiss) battalion.
- I Corps (72,000-96,000) commanded by Marshal Louis-Nicolas Davout. The strongest corps left Vilnius on 1 July, occupied Minsk, beat Bagration at Mogilev and with only 20,000 men left he went to Smolensk and joined the main army. Only 1,800 arrived at the Berezina.
- II Corps (37,000-42,000) commanded by Marshal Nicolas Oudinot crossed the Niemen was sent to the other side of the Viliya and expected to join with McDonald to combat Wittgenstein, who protected the road to St Petersburg. This corps left mid-October after losing the Second Battle of Polotsk; it was joined by IX corps (reserve). Arriving at the Berezina before Wittgenstein they played a key role in securing the crossing of the river; Nicolas Joseph Maison took over. 300 were able to leave the country?
- III Corps (40,000) commanded by Marshal Michel Ney. He defended downstream the 4th pontoon bridge at Aleksotas which could be used to escape; he then went to Polotsk. During the retreat his corps was in the rear. After being cut off from the main army in the Battle of Krasnoi Ney managed to escape in heavy fog and thin ice over the Dnieper River but without his artillery.

==== Reserve cavalry (vanguard) ====
Marshal Joachim Murat, his brother-in-law, under King of Naples, followed with (21,000) Napoleon to Vilnius and Vitebsk

- I Reserve Cavalry Corps (11,000) commanded by General Étienne Marie Antoine Champion de Nansouty went to Polotsk
- II Reserve Cavalry Corps (10,000) commanded by General Louis-Pierre Montbrun went to Polotsk

=== Second Central force ===
It followed behind the central force and (81,000) crossed at Pilona and avoided Vilnius

- IV Corps (46,000) commanded by General Eugène de Beauharnais, Viceroy of the Kingdom of Italy. They crossed the Niemen 20 km upstream near Piliuona. Unlike the I, II and III Corps Napoleon's stepson had orders to avoid Vilnius on his way to Vitebsk; only 1,600 arrived at the Berezina.
- VI Corps (25,000 – 30,000) commanded by General Laurent de Gouvion Saint-Cyr. They crossed at Pilona and moved east. He went to Polotsk to attack Wittgenstein. When Oudinot was wounded in the Battle of Klyastitsy he took over command of the II corps; he retreated after the Second Battle of Polotsk.
- III Reserve Cavalry Corps (10,000) commanded by General Emmanuel de Grouchy crossed as first the Dniepr at Mogilev

=== Right flank force ===
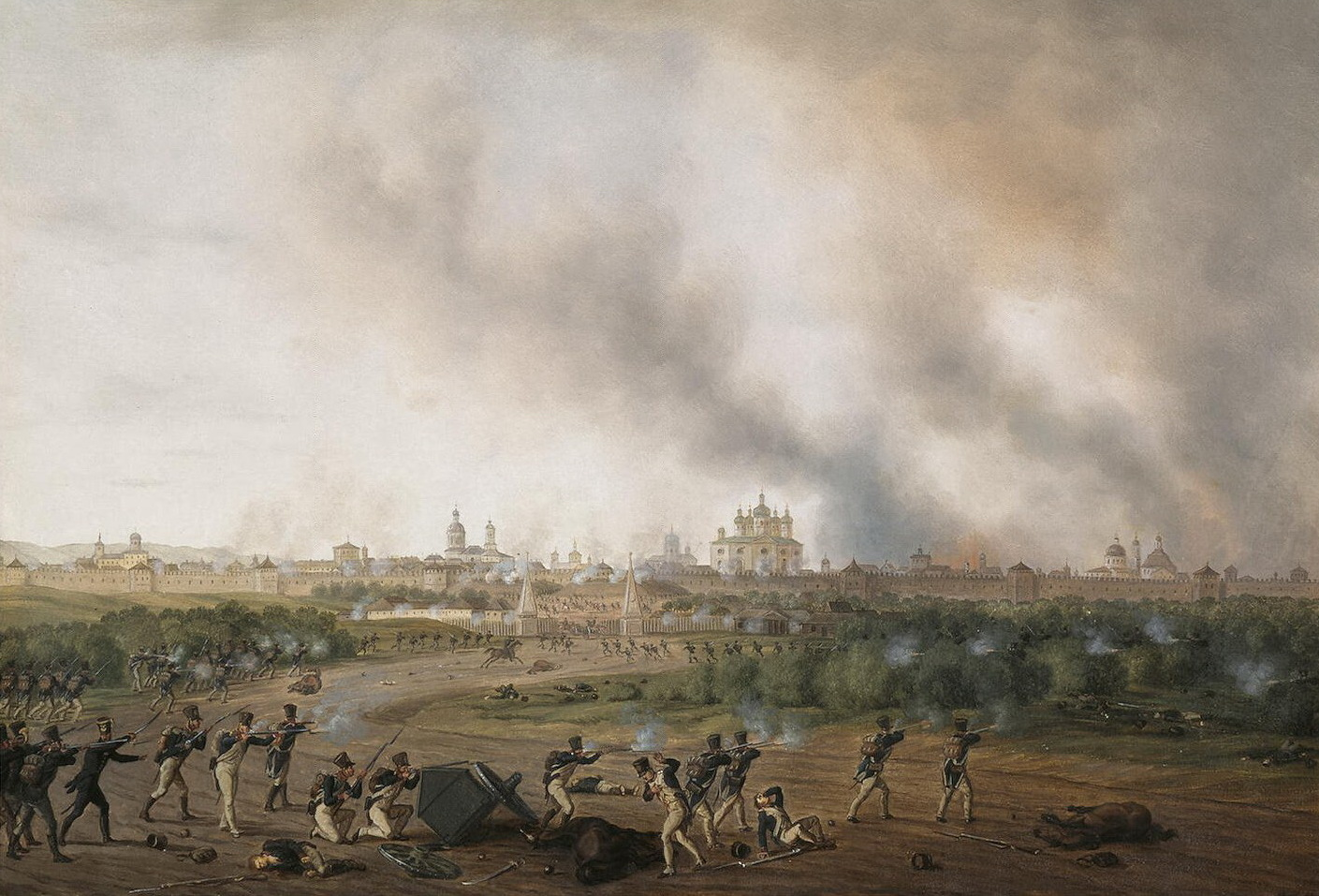
Battle of Smolensk on 18 August 1812, by Albracht Adam

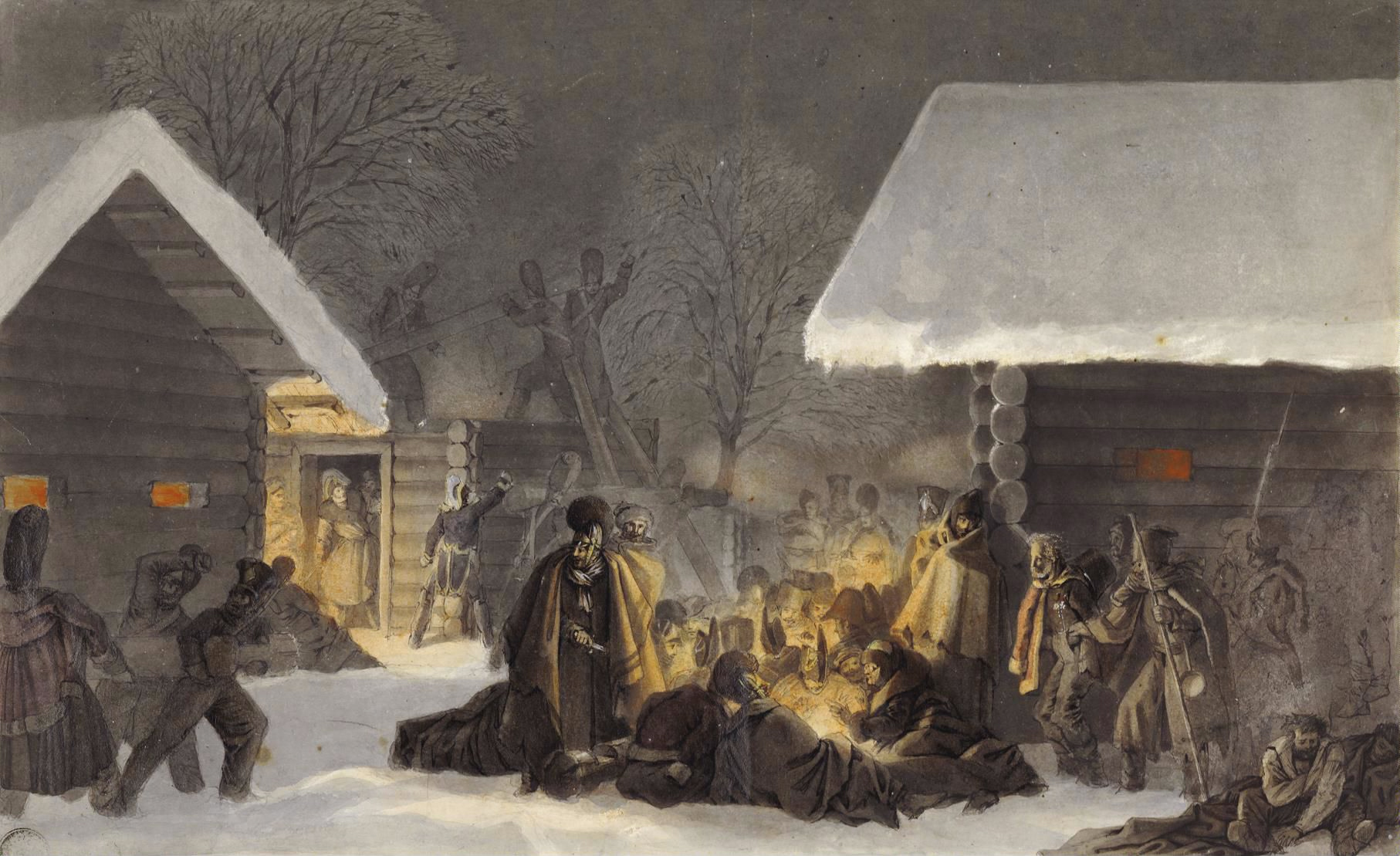
Berezina. French troops in Studzenke (C. Faber du Faur, 27.11.1812).

Napoleon's brother Jérôme Bonaparte King of Westphalia (62,000) crossed the Niemen near Grodno on 1 July, and moved towards Bagration's (second western) army. On the order of Napoleon, Davout secretly took over the command on 6 July. In the Battle of Mir Jerome let Platov escape by deploying too few of Poniatowki's troops. Jérôme was sent to Slutsk but left the army after being criticised by Davout. He went home at the end of July, taking a battalion of guards with him. Davout took over the command of Latour's cavalry, trying to prevent Bagration from moving north.

- V Corps (36,000 Polish) commanded by General Józef Poniatowski. He joined Davout and went to Mogilev and Smolensk. Early November Zajączek took over the command but the corps ceased to exist after the Battle of Krasnoi; Dombrowski stayed around Minsk; 8,000 men arrived at the Berezina.
- VIII Corps (17,000 Westphalians) under Vandamme. Early July Jérôme Bonaparte took over and Vandamme was sent home. Jérome resigned on 15 July when he found out Davout had been secretly given the command. Early August the command was given to Junot. Junot didn't take part in the Battle of Smolensk (1812) as he was sent to bypass the left flank of the Russian army, but then got lost. Junot was blamed for allowing the Russian army to retreat at the Battle of Valutino; General Rapp took over. After the Battle of Borodino the corps had only 2,000 men left. They were ordered to stay behind and clear up the site. At the end of the war 1,200 arrived in Poland.
- IV Reserve Cavalry Corps (9,000) commanded by General Victor de Fay de La Tour-Maubourg joined Davout. Only 150 arrived at the Berezina

With French forces moving through different routes in the direction of Vitebsk, a first major engagement took place on 25 July at the Battle of Ostrowno.

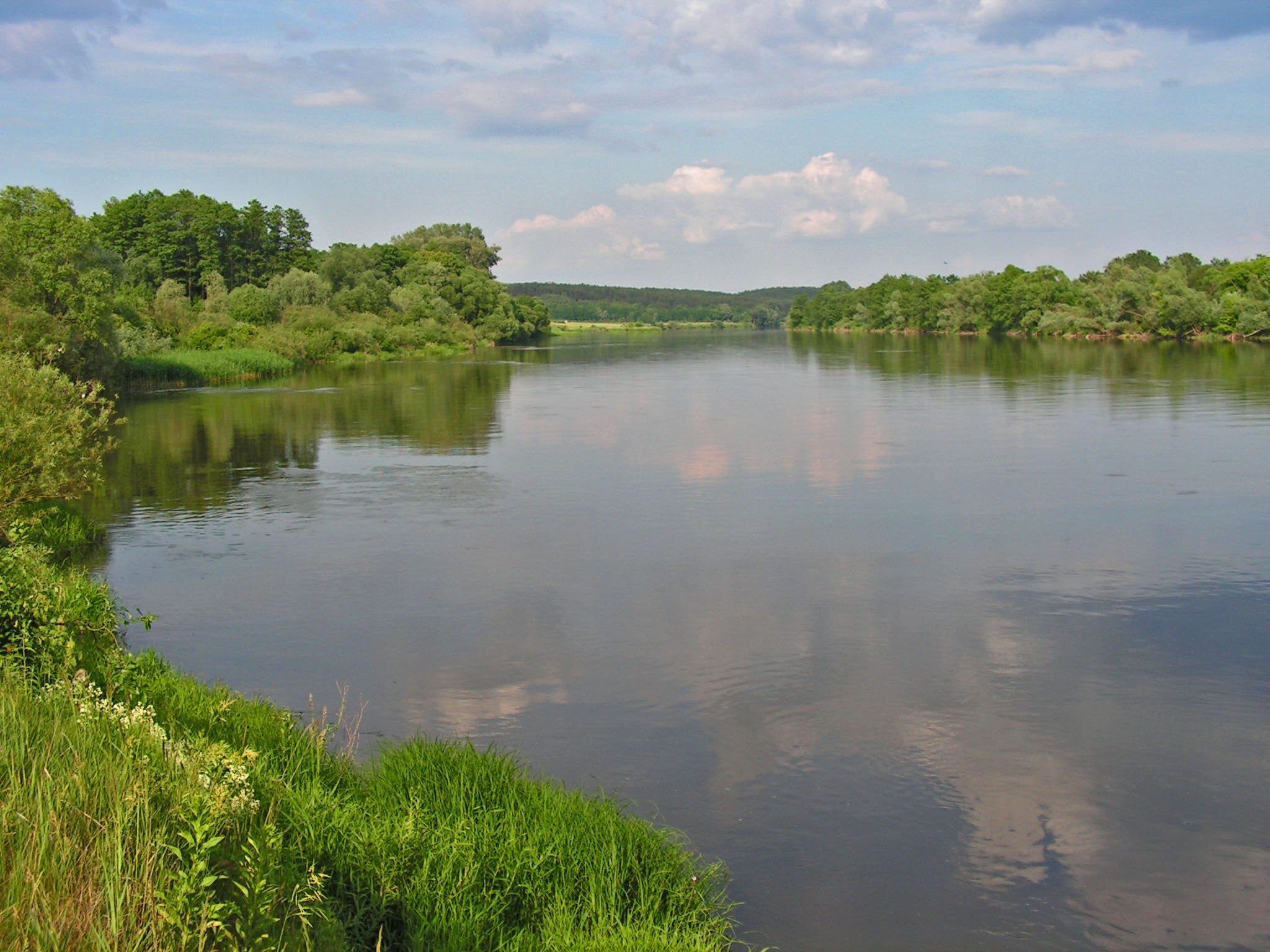
The Bug near Drohiczyn, where the Austrian army and Reynier crossed the river

=== Southern flank ===
- VII Corps (17,000) commanded by General Jean Reynier. He stayed in the Grodno region to protect the Duchy of Warsaw against Tormasow; on 26 December between 5 and 11,000 arrived in Poland.
- XII Corps (with the Austrian Corps) (34,000) commanded by Field Marshal Karl von Schwarzenberg crossed the Bug on 2 July on a pontoon bridge to go after Bagration and Tormasow. He was prevented from joining up with Davout. The VII corps came under his command when Reynier fell back. When Tormassov occupied Brest (Belarus) at the end of July, he was cut off from supplies. On 18 September he withdrew when Pavel Chichagov arrived from the south. Schwarzenberg won the Battle of Wolkowisk. He crossed the Polish border on 14 December 1812. Many survived.

=== Reserve units in Poland and Prussia ===
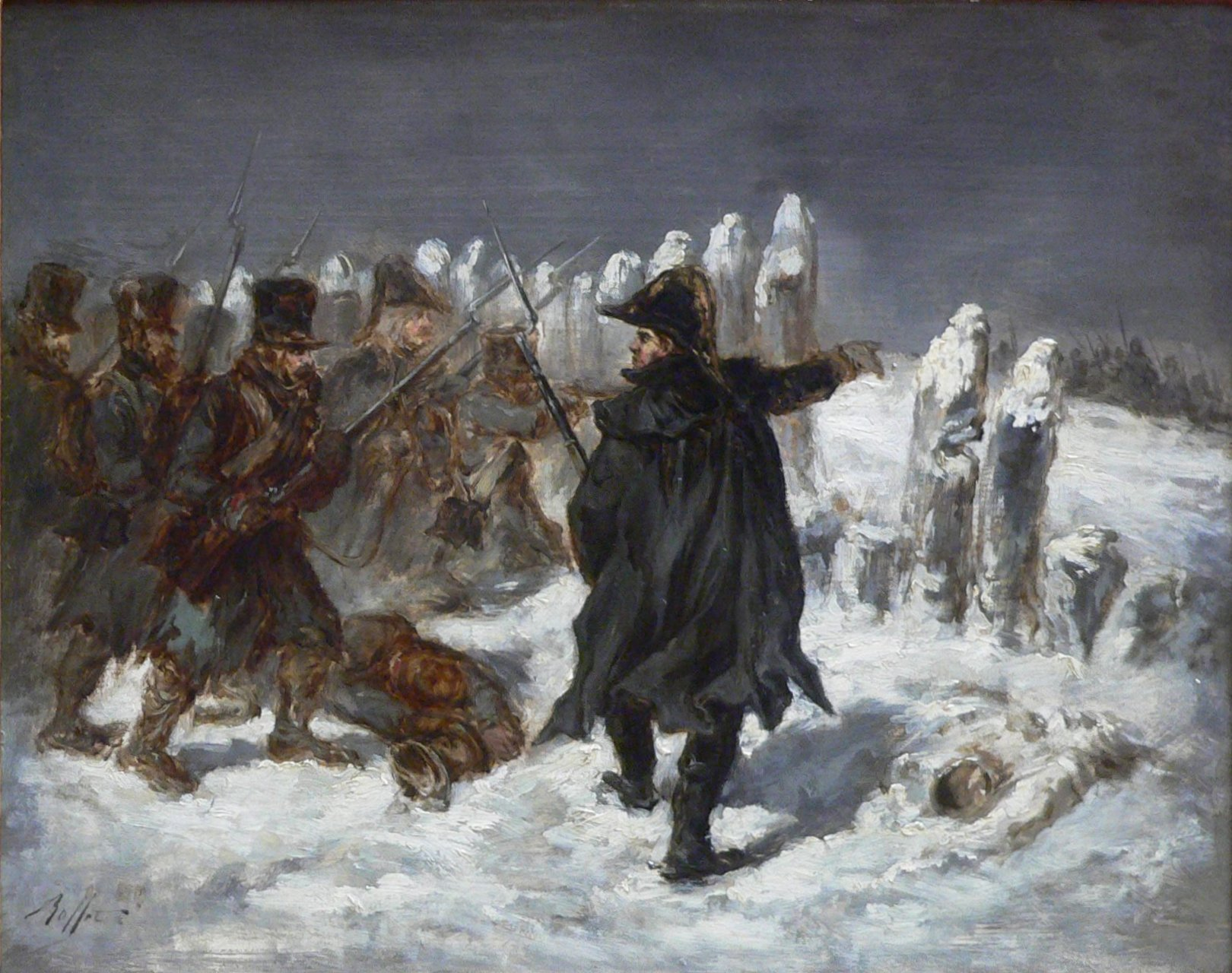
Ney at Kaunas in December 1812, painting by Auguste Raffet in the Louvre

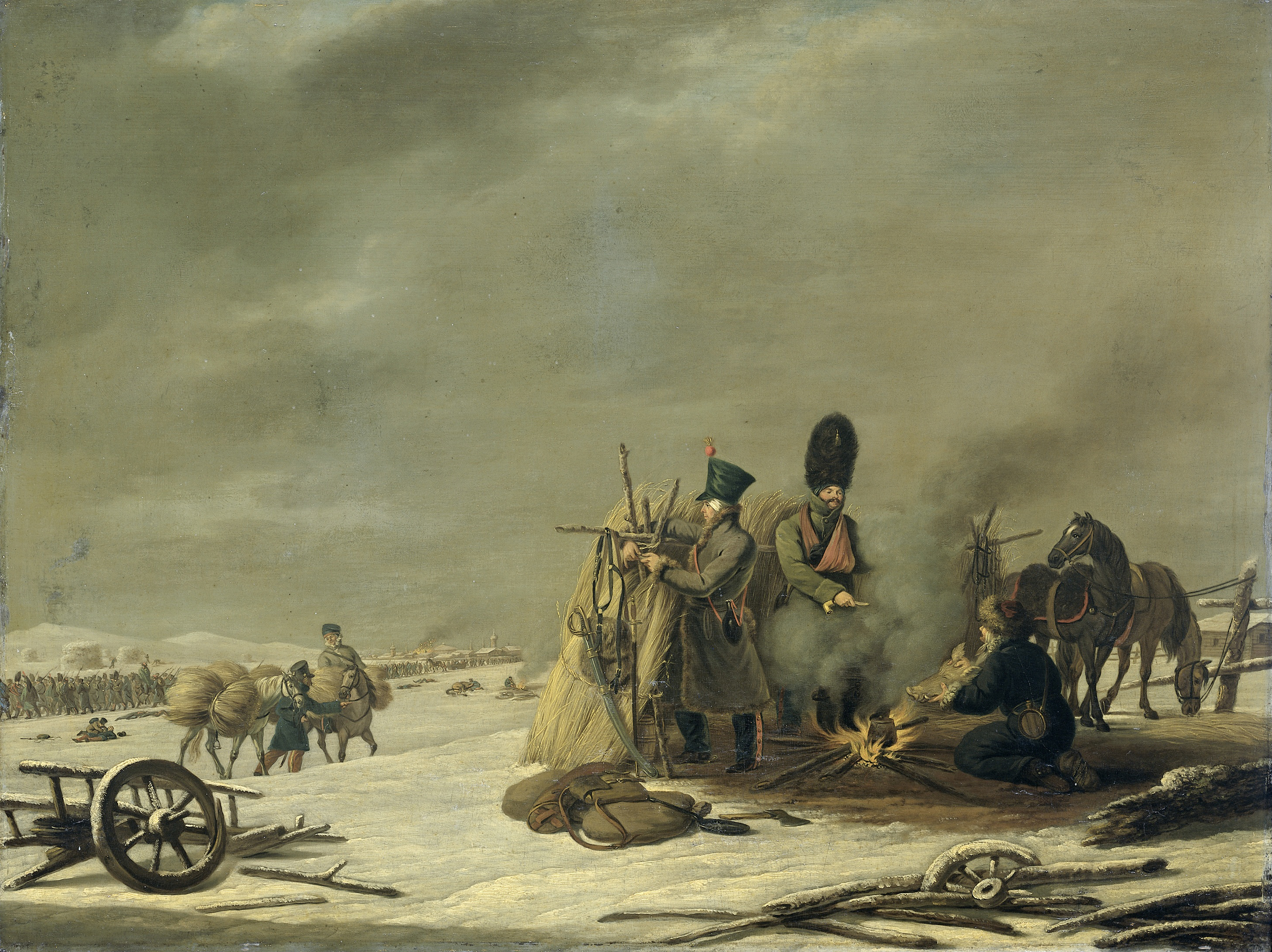
Night Quarters at Molodechna, December 3–4, 1812, Rijksmuseum

Several units marched to Russia in the late stage of the campaign. In November, the division of Durutte assisted Reynier. In December Loison was sent to help extricate the remnants of the Grand Army in its retreat. Within a few days many of Loison's unexperienced soldiers died of the extreme cold. Napoleon arrested him for not marching with his division to the front.

- XI Corps (50,000) commanded by Marshal Pierre Augereau. This corps did not participate in military operations in Russia, and Augereau never left Berlin. Augereau also had at his disposal a division of 10,000 Danes under General Johann Ewald, which remained in Holstein for the duration of the campaign.
- IX Corps (30,000 French) commanded by Marshal Claude Victor-Perrin. Early August his corps was in Tilsit, at the end of September the majority arrived at Smolensk; At the end of October he took over the command from St. Cyr, but lost the Battle of Chashniki and the Battle of Smoliani and unable to retake Polotsk. He had orders to follow Oudinot; 3,500 arrived at the Berezina and fired the bridges behind them.

In addition, National Guard units had been conscripted for full military service defending the frontier of the Duchy of Warsaw. With these included total forces on the Russian border and in Russia came to around 685,000 men. This vast commitment of manpower severely strained the French Empire — especially considering that there were a further 220,000 French troops fighting in Iberia and over 100,000 more in Germany and Italy.

== Nationalities ==
According to Richard K. Riehn, the army is estimated to consist of:

- 300,000 troops from the First French Empire
  - 255,000 French
  - 15,000 Dutch from the annexed Kingdom of Holland
  - 10,000 Flemish and Walloon from the annexed Belgium territories
  - 10,000 Germans from annexed Northern Germany and the left bank of the Rhine
  - 10,000 Italians from annexed Piedmont, Liguria, Tuscany, Parma and Rome
- 108,000 Poles and Lithuanians
  - 67,000 Polish from the Duchy of Warsaw
  - 12,000 Polish National Guard, depot companies and garrisons in defence of Duchy of Warsaw
  - 10,000 Polish in French service (Vistula Legion, 8th Chevauleger-Lancer, 1st and 3rd Guard Chevauleger-Lancer)
  - 19,000 newly formed regiments during the campaign in Lithuania
- 111,500 Germans from the Confederation of the Rhine
  - 29,000 Bavarians
  - 22,500 Saxons
  - 22,000 Westphalians (other German sources mention 28,000)
  - 12,000 Württembergers
  - 6,000 Badeners
  - 5,000 Bergers
  - 4,000 Hessians
  - 11,000 from other members of the Rhine Confederation
- 27,000 Italians from the Kingdom of Italy
- 8,000 Neapolitans the majority of whom never went to Russia, part were garrisoned in Danzig, and part was sent back to Naples
- 9,000 Swiss (German sources mention 16,000)
- 4,800 Spanish
- 3,500 Croats
- 2,000 Portuguese
- 5,900 Illyrian, Dalmatian, and Mediterranean minorities
- 20,000 Prussians. There served Prussian German, but also some Polish from Silesia, West and East Prussia
- 34,000 Austrians. This corps consisted of several nationalities:
  - 11,000 Hungarians, Slovaks, Serbs, Romanians, and Ruthenian-Ukrainians
  - 9,700 German speaking Austrians
  - 8,000 Polish and Ruthenian-Ukrainian from Galicia
  - 2,700 Bohemians and Moravian Czechs
  - 2,600 Croats

The total is 643,500 men, but at least 130,000 were auxiliary troops, involved in the supply of the army.

Anthony Joes in Journal of Conflict Studies wrote that:

Figures on how many men Napoleon took into Russia and how many eventually came out vary rather widely.

- Georges Lefebvre suggested that Napoleon crossed the Neman with over 600,000 soldiers, only half of whom were from France.
- Felix Markham suggested that 450,000 crossed the Neman on 24/25 June 1812, of whom less than 40,000 recrossed in anything like a recognizable military formation.
- James Marshall-Cornwall suggested 510,000 troops entered Russia.
- Eugene Tarle suggested that 420,000 crossed with Napoleon and 150,000 eventually followed, for a grand total of 570,000.

Whatever the accurate number, it is generally accepted that the overwhelming majority of this grand army, French and allied, remained, in one condition or another, inside Russia.

Minard's infographic (see below) depicts the march ingeniously by showing the size of the advancing army, overlaid on a rough map, as well as the retreating soldiers together with temperatures recorded (as much as 30 below zero on the Réaumur scale) on their return. The numbers on this chart have 422,000 crossing the Neman with Napoleon, 22,000 taking a side trip early on in the campaign, 100,000 surviving the battles en route to Moscow and returning from there; only 4,000 survive the march back, to be joined by 6,000 that survived that initial 22,000 in the feint attack northward; in the end, only 10,000 cross the Neman back out of the initial 422,000.

Adam Zamoyski estimated that between 550,000 and 600,000 French and allied troops (including reinforcements) operated beyond the Niemen, of which as many as 400,000 troops died.

== Russian Imperial Army ==
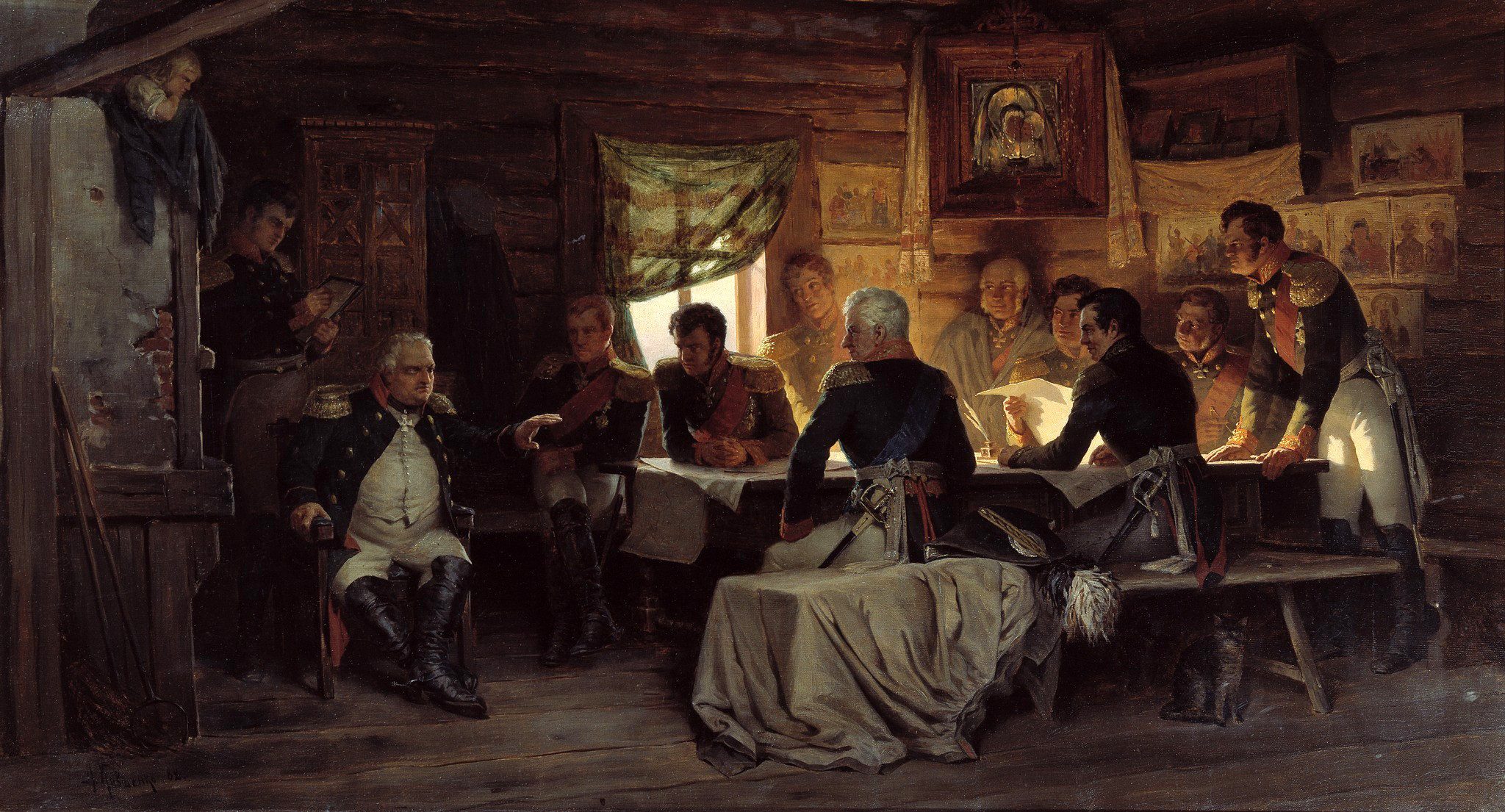
Michail Illarionovich Kutuzov (1745–1813) is sitting on the far left, with his generals (Council of War) deciding to save the army from another battle and surrender Moscow to Napoleon.

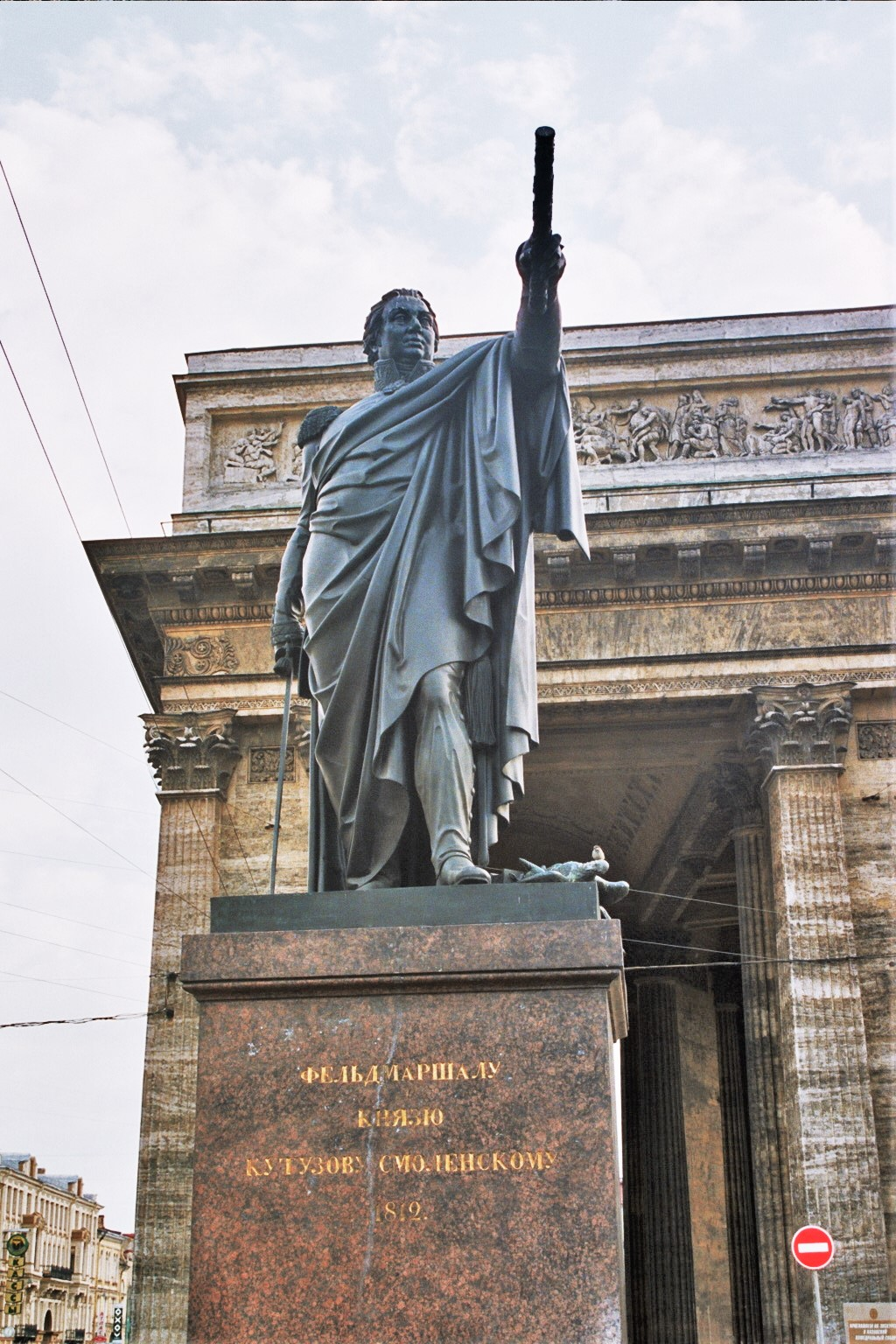
Monument to Kutuzov in front of the Kazan Cathedral in Saint Petersburg. The Kazan Cathedral and the Cathedral of Christ the Saviour in Moscow were built to commemorate the Russian victory against Napoleon.

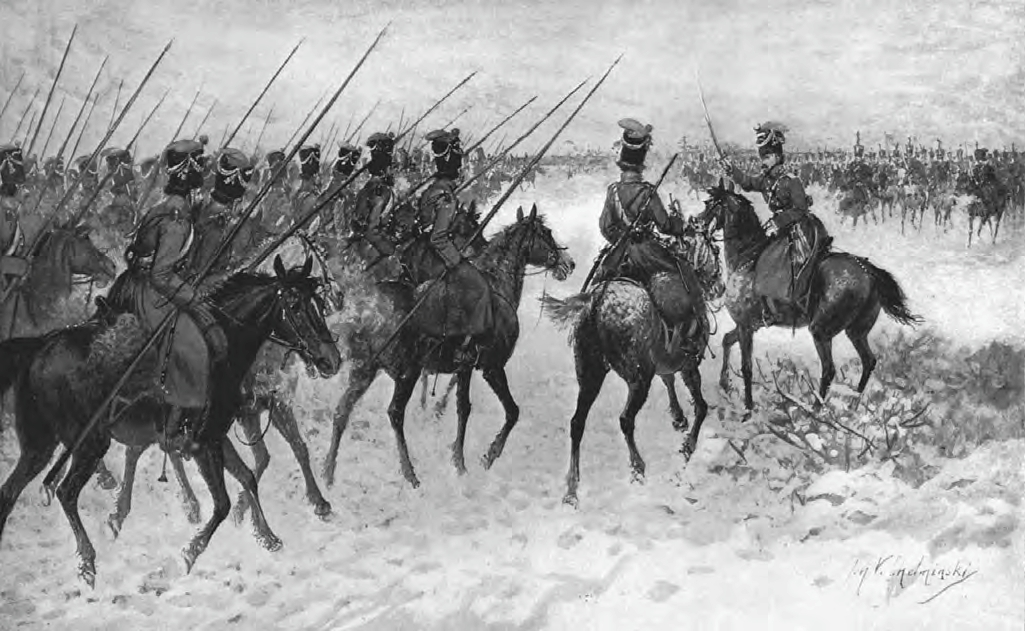
As irregular cavalry, the Cossack horsemen of the Russian steppes were best suited to reconnaissance, scouting, and harassing the enemy's flanks and supply lines. Seldom were they committed to execute a conventional charge in battle.

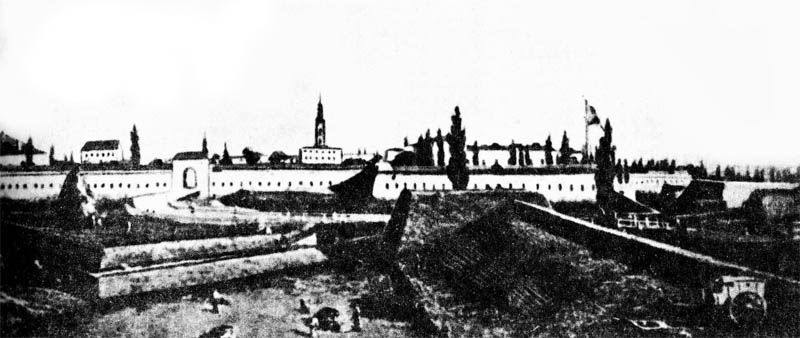
Babruysk fortress in 1811

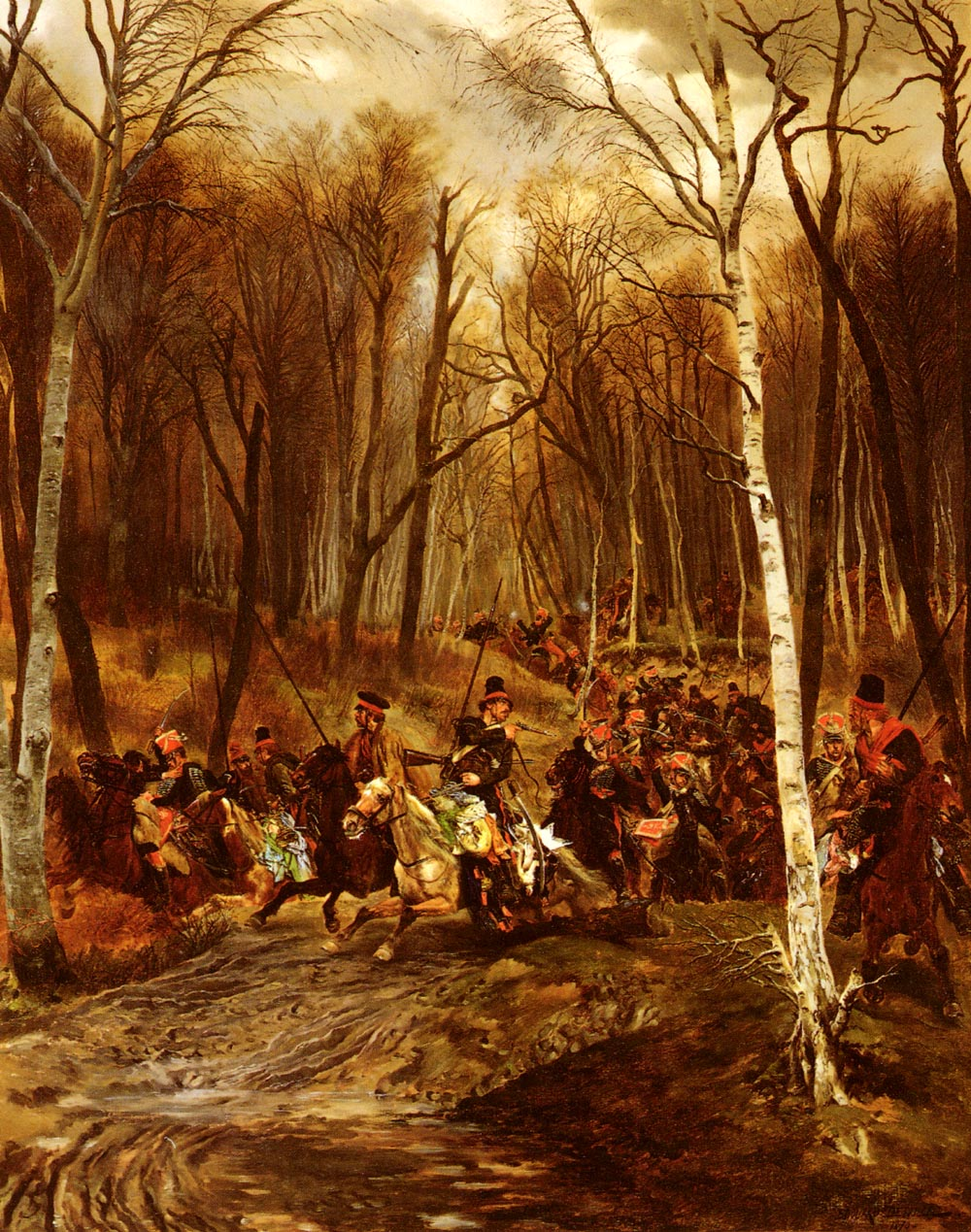
Detaille – Cossacks Attacking a squad of the Gardes d'honneur from the Jeune Garde Imperiale

The forces immediately facing Napoleon consisted of three armies, operating around the Western Dvina, the Dnieper and the Bug (river), comprising 175–250,000 Russians and 15,000 Cossacks, with 938 guns as follows:

Minister of War Mikhail Barclay de Tolly served as the Commander in Chief of the Russian Armies until early October. He was field commander of the First Western Army and replaced by Mikhail Kutuzov who was appointed Commander-in-chief on 17th and arrived on the 29th of August. After the Battle at Borodino Kutuzov was appointed General Field Marshal, the highest military rank.

- First Western Army under Emperor Alexander I with General of Infantry Mikhail Barclay de Tolly as a field commander numbered 104,250 men and 7,000 Cossacks with 558 guns. Tolly interrupted his service for five months.
- Chief of Staff General Lieutenant Aleksey Petrovich Yermolov
  - I Infantry Corps General Lieutenant Prince Peter Khristianovich Wittgenstein became detached as Right Wing. He defended the road to St Petersburg, retreated to Vidzy, took Polotsk and went to Borisov before arriving at the Berezina. (Note: The appointment of Wittgenstein as commander-in-chief of the united Russian and Prussian armies provoked open hostility from his new subordinates and, at the same time, from his seniors: Miloradovich, Barclay de Tolly, Langeron, Platov and Tormasov. Tormasov refused to obey Wittgenstein altogether and left the army, while Miloradovich stayed and became the "official speaker" for the opposition.)
  - II Infantry Corps General Lieutenant Karl Gustav von Baggovut
  - III Infantry Corps General Lieutenant Nikolay Tuchkov
  - IV Infantry Corps General Lieutenant Shuvalov, since 25 August General Lieutenant Alexander Ivanovich Ostermann-Tolstoy. When retreating from the Niemen, they forgot to give Ivan Semyonovich Dorokhov, leading a cavalry, the order to withdraw. He was cut off by the enemy from the main forces but succeeded to connect with Bagration.
  - V (Guards) Infantry Corps Grand Duke Constantine later General Lieutenant Lavrov
  - VI Infantry Corps General Lieutenant Dmitry Dokhturov, who was stationed near Lida was cut off from the main forces of the 1st Army. He was able cutting across the advancing French army and connect; involved in the Battle of Borodino and Maloyaroslavets.
  - I Cavalry Corps General Fyodor Uvarov
  - II Cavalry Corps General Friedrich von Korff
  - III Cavalry Corps General Major Kreutz
  - Cossacks Corps Matvei Platov – Ataman of the Don Cossacks
- Second Western Army General of the Infantry Prince Pyotr Ivanovich Bagration numbered 33,000 men and 4,000 Cossacks with 216 guns. His headquarters were in Vawkavysk. After Bagration died in September, A. Tormasov took over.
  - VII Infantry Corps General Lieutenant Nikolay Raevsky; involved in the Battle of Saltanovka, Borodino, Maloyaroslavets, and Krasnoi where he defeated Marshal Ney.
  - VIII Infantry Corps Adjutant general Nikolai Borozdin
  - IV Cavalry Corps General Major Karl von Sievers
- Third Reserve Army of Observation General of the Cavalry Alexander Tormasov numbered 38,000 men and 4,000 Cossacks, with 164 guns. His headquarters were in Lutsk. When the Moldavian army arrived, he handed over the supreme command to Chichagov and took over Bagration's command of the reserve of the main army. Instead Dmitry Golitsyn was appointed.
  - Corps General of Infantry Sergei Kamensky
  - Corps General Lieutenant Yevgeni Ivanovich Markov
  - Corps General Lieutenant Fabian Gottlieb von Osten-Sacken
  - Cavalry Corps General Major Charles de Lambert and occupied Minsk on 16 November

There also were forces gathered in several places:

- Riga Corps (lieutenant general Ivan von Essen Ist)
- Finland Corps (General Lieutenant Fabian Steinheil) arrived on the frontline in Riga, and took part in the Second Battle of Polotsk
- Ist Reserve Corps (General Adjutant baron E.I. Meller-Zakomelskiy)
- IInd Reserve Corps (General Lieutenant Fyodor Ertell)
- Bobruysk Detachment (General Major Gavriil Ignatyev)
- Smolensk Reserve Corps (General Adjutant baron Ferdinand von Wintzingerode)
- Kaluga Reserve Corps (General of the Infantry of Mikhail Miloradovich). As governor of Kyiv he was tasked with assembling and training volunteer militia troops in the "hinterland"; he returned to action in the Battle of Borodino.
- 27th Infantry Division (General Major Dmitry Neverovsky)
- Danube Army Admiral Pavel Chichagov in South Ukraine and Bessarabia, arrived on the frontline in September 1812
  - I Corps (General of Infantry Andrault de Langeron)
  - II Corps (General Lieutenant Pyotr Essen-IIIrd)
  - III Corps (General Lieutenant Voinov)
  - IV Corps (General Lieutenant Zass)
  - Reserve Corps (General Lieutenant Sabaneev)
- Detachment in Serbia (General Major N.I. Luders)

These forces, however, could count on reinforcements from the second line, which totalled 129,000 men and 8,000 Cossacks, with 434 guns and 433 rounds of ammo.

Of these, about 105,000 men were actually available for the defence against the invasion. In the third line were the 36 recruit depots and militias, which came to the total of approximately 161,000 men of various and highly disparate military values, of which about 133,000 actually took part in the defence.

Thus, the grand total of all Russian forces was 488,000 men, of which about 428,000 gradually came into action against the Grande Armée. This bottom line, however, includes more than 80,000 Cossacks and militiamen, as well as about 20,000 men who garrisoned the fortresses in the operational area. (Note: This section does not mention: Levin August von Bennigsen, who was sent back on 15 November 1812; Pavel Alexandrovich Stroganov; Dmitry Buturlin, George Carpenter, Ilya Duka, Adam Ozharovsky, Denis Davydov and Vasily Orlov-Denisov, all involved in the Battle of Krasnoi.)

Sweden, Russia's only ally besides England, did not send supporting troops. But the alliance made it possible to withdraw part troops from the 45,000 men Russian corps Steinheil from Finland and use it in the later battles (20,000 men were sent to Riga and Polotsk).

== Sources ==
- Clausewitz, Carl von (1906). Der Feldzug 1812 in Russland (in German).
- Lieven, D. C. B (2010). Russia against Napoleon. Viking. ISBN 9780670021574.
- Zamoyski, Adam (2004). Moscow 1812: Napoleon's Fatal March. London: HarperCollins. ISBN 978-0-00-712375-9.
- Sokolov, Oleg V. (2020). Битва двух империй. 1805-1812 [The Battle of two Empires, 1805-1812]. Лучшие воины в истории (Best warriors in history) (in Russian). Moscow. ISBN 978-5-00155-152-2.
