= List of battles of the French invasion of Russia =

This is a list of sieges, land and naval battles of the French invasion of Russia (24 June – 14 December 1812).

French invasion of Russia
Prussian corps
Napoleon
Austrian corps

Date	Battle	Governorate	French forces	Russian forces	Notes
27–28 June 1812	Battle of Grodno	Lithuania-Grodno	First French Empire	Russian Empire	French victory
9–10 July 1812	Battle of Mir	Lithuania-Grodno	Duchy of Warsaw	Russian Empire	Russian victory
19 July 1812	Battle of Ekau	Courland	First French Empire; Kingdom of Prussia	Russian Empire	French victory
23 July 1812	Battle of Saltanovka	Mogilev	First French Empire	Russian Empire	French victory
24 July – 18 December 1812	Siege of Riga	Livonia	First French Empire; Kingdom of Prussia	Russian Empire; United Kingdom	Russian victory
25 July 1812	Battle of Ostrovno	Mogilev	First French Empire (Kingdom of Naples) Napoleonic Naples	Russian Empire	French victory
26–27 July 1812	Battle of Vitebsk	Vitebsk	First French Empire	Russian Empire	French victory
27 July 1812	Battle of Kobrin	Lithuania-Grodno	Kingdom of Saxony	Russian Empire	Russian victory
30 July – 1 August 1812	Battle of Klyastitsy	Vitebsk	First French Empire	Russian Empire	Russian victory
8 August 1812	Battle of Inkovo	Smolensk	First French Empire	Russian Empire	Russian victory
11 August 1812	Battle of Swolna	Vitebsk	First French Empire	Russian Empire	Indecisive
12 August 1812	Battle of Gorodechno	Lithuania-Grodno	Austrian Empire; Kingdom of Saxony	Russian Empire	French victory
14 August 1812	First Battle of Krasnoi	Smolensk	First French Empire	Russian Empire	French victory
16–18 August 1812	Battle of Smolensk	Smolensk	First French Empire; Duchy of Warsaw	Russian Empire	French victory
17–18 August 1812	First Battle of Polotsk	Vitebsk	First French Empire; Kingdom of Bavaria	Russian Empire	Indecisive
19 August 1812	Battle of Valutino	Smolensk	First French Empire	Russian Empire	Indecisive
22 August 1812	Battle of Dahlenkirchen	Livonia	First French Empire; Kingdom of Prussia	Russian Empire	Russian victory
N.S.: 5 September 1812; O.S.: 24 August 1812	Battle of Shevardino	Moscow	First French Empire; Napoleonic Italy (Kingdom of Naples) Napoleonic Naples; Duchy of Warsaw	Russian Empire	French victory
N.S.: 7 September 1812; O.S.: 26 August 1812	Battle of Borodino	Moscow	First French Empire; Duchy of Warsaw; Napoleonic Italy (Kingdom of Naples) Napoleonic Naples; Kingdom of Bavaria (Kingdom of Westphalia) K. of Westphalia (Kingdom of Württemberg) K. of Württemberg; Kingdom of Saxony (Grand Duchy of Hesse) Gr. Duchy of Hesse	Russian Empire	Indecisive; French occupy Moscow
14 September – 19 October 1812	French occupation of Moscow; Fire of Moscow	Moscow	First French Empire	Russian Empire	French tactical victory Russian strategic victory Fires destroy Moscow; French abandon Moscow
26/30 September – 1 October 1812	Battle of Mesoten	Courland	Kingdom of Prussia	Russian Empire	French victory
18 October 1812	Battle of Tarutino	Kaluga	First French Empire (Kingdom of Naples) Napoleonic Naples	Russian Empire	Russian victory
18–20 October 1812	Second Battle of Polotsk	Vitebsk	First French Empire	Russian Empire	Russian victory
24 October 1812	Battle of Maloyaroslavets	Kaluga	First French Empire; Napoleonic Italy	Russian Empire	French tactical victory Russian strategic victory
31 October 1812	Battle of Chashniki	Vitebsk	First French Empire	Russian Empire	Russian victory
3 November 1812	Battle of Vyazma	Smolensk	First French Empire; Duchy of Warsaw (Kingdom of Naples) Napoleonic Naples; Kingdom of Bavaria (Kingdom of Westphalia) K. of Westphalia (Kingdom of Württemberg) K. of Württemberg; Kingdom of Saxony (Grand Duchy of Hesse) Gr. Duchy of Hesse; Gr. Duchy of Berg (Grand Duchy of Baden) Gr. Duchy of Baden	Russian Empire	Russian key victory
9 November 1812	Battle of Liaskowa	Smolensk	First French Empire	Russian Empire	Russian victory
13 November 1812	Battle of Nowo Schwerschen	Minsk	Lithuanian PGC; Duchy of Warsaw	Russian Empire	Russian victory
13–14 November 1812	Battle of Smoliani	Vitebsk	First French Empire	Russian Empire	Russian victory
14–16 November 1812	Battle of Wolkowisk	Lithuania-Grodno	Austrian Empire; Kingdom of Saxony; First French Empire	Russian Empire	French victory
15 November 1812	Battle of Kaidanowo	Minsk	First French Empire; Lithuanian PGC; Duchy of Warsaw (Kingdom of Württemberg) K. of Württemberg	Russian Empire	Russian victory
15–18 November 1812	Second Battle of Krasnoi	Smolensk	First French Empire; Duchy of Warsaw	Russian Empire	Russian victory
21 November 1812	Battle of Borisov	Minsk	Duchy of Warsaw; First French Empire	Russian Empire	Russian victory
23 November 1812	Battle of Loschniza	Minsk	First French Empire	Russian Empire	French victory
26–29 November 1812	Battle of Berezina	Minsk	First French Empire; Duchy of Warsaw; Napoleonic Italy (Kingdom of Naples) Napoleonic Naples; Kingdom of Bavaria (Kingdom of Westphalia) K. of Westphalia (Kingdom of Württemberg) K. of Württemberg; Kingdom of Saxony (Grand Duchy of Hesse) Gr. Duchy of Hesse	Russian Empire	Indecisive (Note: Though the Russians inflicted significant casualties on the Grande Armée, Napoleon was able to retreat in good order and save important parts of his troops, denying the enemy a crushing victory.); Russian tactical victory French strategic victory

== See also ==
- Attrition warfare against Napoleon
- Lists of battles of the French Revolutionary Wars and Napoleonic Wars
- List of battles of the War of the First Coalition
- List of battles of the War of the Second Coalition
- List of battles of the War of the Third Coalition
- List of battles of the War of the Fourth Coalition
- List of battles of the War of the Fifth Coalition
- List of battles of the War of the Sixth Coalition
- List of battles of the Hundred Days (War of the Seventh Coalition)
- Order of battle of the French invasion of Russia
- Russian Army order of battle (1812)
- List of battles of the Polish–Russian War (1654–1667) (partly in Belarus)
- Timeline of the Finnish War

== Bibliography ==
- Clodfelter, Micheal (2008). Warfare and armed conflicts : a statistical encyclopedia of casualty and other figures, 1494-2007. McFarland, Incorporated, Publishers. ISBN 9780786433193.
- Chandler, David (1966). The Campaigns of Napoleon. Weidenfeld and Nicolson. ISBN 978-0025236608.
