= Battle of Grodno (1812) =

Battle of the French invasion of Russia

- Part of French invasion of Russia
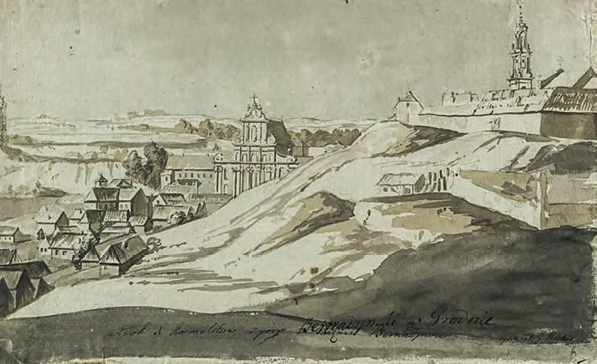
- Panorama of Grodno at the beginning of the 19th century
Date	27–28 June 1812
Location	Grodno
Result	French victory
Territorial changes	Grodno handed over to the Grand Duchy of Lithuania

Belligerents
French Empire; Duchy of Warsaw	Russian Empire

Commanders and leaders
Allix de Vaux; Jan Dąbrowski	Matvey Platov

Strength
1,200 cavalry 2,400 infantry	4,400 Cossacks

Casualties and losses
- Unknown number of soldiers killed or wounded, garrison forced to retreat

The Battle of Grodno was one of the first battles that took place on 27–28 June at the initial stage of the Patriotic War of 1812 between the vanguard of the right wing of Napoleon's Grand Army and the rearguard of the Russian 2nd Western Army.

== Strategic situation ==
On 20 June 1812, the regiments of the Cossack Corps of Ataman Platov (14 regiments) arrived in the vicinity of Grodno to guard the borders. Four days later, 130 kilometres (81 mi) north of Grodno, near the city of Kovno, Emperor Napoleon Bonaparte began to ferry troops across the Neman River to attack Kovno.

On 24 June, from the city of Lomzha, the King of Westphalia, Jérôme Bonaparte, advances the right wing of the Great Army under the command of Brigadier General Allix de Vaux through Augustów to Grodno.

On the evening of 26 June, Platov's Cossack Corps, which was originally the vanguard of the 2nd Western Army, was given orders by Alexander I to act on the enemy's flank and rear. Therefore, the regiments of his corps began to be withdrawn from the border from border settlements to concentrate through Lida near Sventsyany. Ataman Platov begins the evacuation of part of the garrison, officials with their families and city supplies (more than 1,000 convoys) through Novogrudok in the direction of Minsk. To cover the evacuation, Platov deployed Cossack regiments on the approaches to Grodno.

== Course of the battle ==
On 27 June, on the Lososyanka River, 4 kilometres (2.5 mi) west of Grodno, several Cossack regiments entered into battle with three regiments of the Polish Division of General Dąbrowski, moving towards Grodno. At the river, the Cossacks started a firefight and delayed the enemy's advance.

On 28 June, the Cossack positions were withdrawn to the bridge near Grodno, in the Neman Suburb. In the morning, together with the reinforcements of General Kaminskiy, under the overall command of General of Artillery Allix de Vo, the enemy attacked the suburb in the direction of the bridge. The first to attack the suburbs were the lancers, who started a battle with the Cossack Hundred. The infantry followed towards the bridge. The city garrison helped the Cossack regiments hold the bridge.

Platov took up defensive positions on the heights of the right bank of the Neman and from there fired on the advancing units with 12 guns from the Don Artillery Company. The fierce exchange of fire with the enemy continued until the evening.

Seeing no way to hold back the increasing onslaught of the enemy with only the forces of the Cossacks, and not having regular infantry, in the evening Platov burned the bridge over the Neman and retreated from Grodno through Shchuchin in the direction of Lida.

== Aftermath ==
After the battle, Grodno was captured by the Franco-Polish forces and subordinated to the Lithuanian Provisional Governing Commission. The citizens of the town welcomed Napoleonic forces as liberators. However, this short period did not last long, because Grodno was recaptured by the Russian soldiers on 8 December of the same year. The inhabitants were punished for supporting the French campaign.

== Legacy ==
The vicinity is mentioned in the 11th Book (titled "The Year 1812") of the Polish epic poem Pan Tadeusz, written by Adam Mickiewicz:

"Soplicowo leżało tuż przy wielkiej drodze / Którą od strony Niemna ciągnęli dwaj wodze / Nasz książę Józef i król westfalski Hieronim / Już zajęli część Litwy od Grodna po Słonim"

Which translates to English language:

"Soplicowo was located right next to a large road / Along which two leaders marched from the Niemen side / Our prince Józef and Westphalian King Jérôme / Have already captured part of Lithuania from Grodno to Slonim".

In 2012, the 200th anniversary of the Franco-Russian war, the battle was reconstructed as well as the French, Polish and Russian units.

== See also ==
- List of battles of the French invasion of Russia

== Sources ==
- Mikhail Inostrantsev. The Patriotic War of 1812. Operations of the 2nd Western Army (Drawings). Sankt–Peterburg. 1912
- Vyacheslav Shved, Sergey Donskikh. Western Region of Belorussiya During the Napoleonic Wars of 1805–1815. Grodno, 2006
- Isaakiy Bykadorov. Kazaks in the Patriotic War of 1812. Moskva. 2008
