= Order of battle of the Imperial Russian Army (1812) =

The Imperial Russian Army in June 1812 consisted of three main armies and other military formations. The Commander in Chief of the Army was Emperor Alexander I.

== First Western Army ==
General of the Infantry Prince Michael Andreas Barclay de Tolly

- 1st Infantry Corps: Lieutenant General Count Peter Wittgenstein

Division	Brigade	Regiment
5th Infantry Major General Gregor von Berg	1st	Sevsk Grenadier
5th Infantry Major General Gregor von Berg	1st	Kaluga Infantry
5th Infantry Major General Gregor von Berg	2nd	Perm Infantry
5th Infantry Major General Gregor von Berg	2nd	Mogilev Infantry
5th Infantry Major General Gregor von Berg	3rd	23rd Jäger
5th Infantry Major General Gregor von Berg	3rd	24th Jäger
14th Infantry Maj. Gen. Ivan Sazonov	1st	Tula Infantry
14th Infantry Maj. Gen. Ivan Sazonov	1st	Navaginsky Infantry
14th Infantry Maj. Gen. Ivan Sazonov	2nd	Riga Infantry
14th Infantry Maj. Gen. Ivan Sazonov	2nd	Tenginsky Infantry
14th Infantry Maj. Gen. Ivan Sazonov	3rd	25th Jäger
14th Infantry Maj. Gen. Ivan Sazonov	3rd	26th Jäger

- Corps Artillery: Nine companies, two pontoon and one pioneer companies
- 1st Cavalry Division: Major General Pyotr Kahovskiy
  - 1st and 5th Cavalry Brigades
    - Riga and Yamburg Dragoon Regiments, Grodno Hussar Regiment and three Cossack Regiments
- 2nd Infantry Corps: Lieutenant General Karl Gustav von Baggovut

Division	Brigade	Regiment
4th Infantry Major General Duke Eugene of Württemberg	1st	Kremenchug Infantry
4th Infantry Major General Duke Eugene of Württemberg	1st	Minsk Infantry
4th Infantry Major General Duke Eugene of Württemberg	2nd	Tobolsk Infantry
4th Infantry Major General Duke Eugene of Württemberg	2nd	Volhynia Infantry
4th Infantry Major General Duke Eugene of Württemberg	3rd	4th Jäger
4th Infantry Major General Duke Eugene of Württemberg	3rd	34th Jäger
17th Infantry Maj. Gen. Zakhar Dmitrievich Olsufiev	1st	Ryazan Infantry
17th Infantry Maj. Gen. Zakhar Dmitrievich Olsufiev	1st	Belozersk Infantry
17th Infantry Maj. Gen. Zakhar Dmitrievich Olsufiev	2nd	Brest Infantry
17th Infantry Maj. Gen. Zakhar Dmitrievich Olsufiev	2nd	Villmanstrand Infantry
17th Infantry Maj. Gen. Zakhar Dmitrievich Olsufiev	3rd	30th Jäger
17th Infantry Maj. Gen. Zakhar Dmitrievich Olsufiev	3rd	48th Jäger

- Corps Artillery: Seven companies
- Elizabethgrad Hussar Regiment
- 3rd Infantry Corps: Lieutenant General Nikolai Tuchkov

Division	Brigade	Regiment
1st Grenadier Major General Count Pavel Stroganov	1st	Life Grenadiers
1st Grenadier Major General Count Pavel Stroganov	1st	Arakcheyev Grenadier
1st Grenadier Major General Count Pavel Stroganov	2nd	Pavlovsky Grenadier
1st Grenadier Major General Count Pavel Stroganov	2nd	Yekaterinoslav Grenadier
1st Grenadier Major General Count Pavel Stroganov	3rd	Saint Petersburg Grenadier
1st Grenadier Major General Count Pavel Stroganov	3rd	Taurida Grenadier
3rd Infantry Maj. Gen. Pyotr Konovnitsyn	1st	Reval Infantry
3rd Infantry Maj. Gen. Pyotr Konovnitsyn	1st	Murom Infantry
3rd Infantry Maj. Gen. Pyotr Konovnitsyn	2nd	Chernigov Infantry
3rd Infantry Maj. Gen. Pyotr Konovnitsyn	2nd	Koporye Infantry
3rd Infantry Maj. Gen. Pyotr Konovnitsyn	3rd	20th Jäger
3rd Infantry Maj. Gen. Pyotr Konovnitsyn	3rd	21st Jäger

- Corps Artillery: Eight companies
- Life Guard Cossack Regiment and one Cossack regiment
- 4th Infantry Corps: Lieutenant General Count Pavel Shuvalov

Division	Brigade	Regiment
11th Infantry Major General Nikolai Bakhmetiev	1st	Kexholm Infantry
11th Infantry Major General Nikolai Bakhmetiev	1st	Pernau Infantry
11th Infantry Major General Nikolai Bakhmetiev	2nd	Polotsk Infantry
11th Infantry Major General Nikolai Bakhmetiev	2nd	Yelets Infantry
11th Infantry Major General Nikolai Bakhmetiev	3rd	1st Jäger
11th Infantry Major General Nikolai Bakhmetiev	3rd	33rd Jäger
23rd Infantry Maj. Gen. Alexey Bakhmetiev	1st	
23rd Infantry Maj. Gen. Alexey Bakhmetiev	2nd	
23rd Infantry Maj. Gen. Alexey Bakhmetiev	3rd	

- Corps Artillery: Six companies
- 5th Reserve Guards Infantry Corps: Grand Duke Constantine Pavlovich of Russia

Division	Brigade	Life Guards Regiment
Guard Infantry Major General Aleksey Yermolov	1st Guards Infantry	Preobrazhensky
Guard Infantry Major General Aleksey Yermolov	1st Guards Infantry	Semyonovsky
Guard Infantry Major General Aleksey Yermolov	2nd Guards Infantry	Izmailovsky
Guard Infantry Major General Aleksey Yermolov	2nd Guards Infantry	Lithuanian
Guard Infantry Major General Aleksey Yermolov	3rd Guards Infantry	Finnish
Guard Infantry Major General Aleksey Yermolov	3rd Guards Infantry	Jager
1st Combined Grenadier	1st	26 combined grenadier battalions
1st Combined Grenadier	2nd	26 combined grenadier battalions
1st Combined Grenadier	3rd	26 combined grenadier battalions
1st Cuirassier Major General Nikolay Depreradovich	Guard Brigade	Chevalier Guard
1st Cuirassier Major General Nikolay Depreradovich	Guard Brigade	Life Guard Horse
1st Cuirassier Major General Nikolay Depreradovich	1st Brigade	Emperor Life Guard
1st Cuirassier Major General Nikolay Depreradovich	1st Brigade	Empress Life Guard
1st Cuirassier Major General Nikolay Depreradovich	1st Brigade	Astrakhan Cuirassier

- Corps Artillery: Four foot and two horse companies, one pioneer company
- 6th Infantry Corps: General of infantry Dmitry Dokhturov

Division	Brigade	Regiment
7th Infantry Major General Peter Kaptzevich	1st	Moscow Infantry
7th Infantry Major General Peter Kaptzevich	1st	Pskov Infantry
7th Infantry Major General Peter Kaptzevich	2nd	Libau Infantry
7th Infantry Major General Peter Kaptzevich	2nd	Sofia Infantry
7th Infantry Major General Peter Kaptzevich	3rd	11th Jäger
7th Infantry Major General Peter Kaptzevich	3rd	36th Jäger
24th Infantry Major General Pyotr Likhachyov	1st	Ufa Infantry
24th Infantry Major General Pyotr Likhachyov	1st	Shirvan Infantry
24th Infantry Major General Pyotr Likhachyov	2nd	Butyrsky Infantry
24th Infantry Major General Pyotr Likhachyov	2nd	Tomsk Infantry
24th Infantry Major General Pyotr Likhachyov	3rd	19th Jäger
24th Infantry Major General Pyotr Likhachyov	3rd	40th Jäger

- Corps Artillery: Seven companies
- Sumy Hussar Regiment
- 1st Reserve Cavalry Corps: General aide-de-camp Fyodor Uvarov
  - 1st Guards Cavalry Brigade
    - Life Guard Dragoon, Life Guard Hussar and Life Guard Uhlan Regiments
  - Brigade
    - Kazan and Nezhin Dragoon Regiments
  - Corps Artillery: One company
- 2nd Reserve Cavalry Corps: General aide-de-camp Baron Fyodor Korf
  - 6th Cavalry Brigade
    - Pskov and Moscow Dragoon Regiments
  - 7th Cavalry Brigade
    - Kargopol and Ingermanland Dragoon Regiments
  - Brigade
    - Izyum Hussar and Polish Uhlan Regiments
  - Corps Artillery: One company
- 3rd Reserve Cavalry Corps: Major General Count Peter Petrovich Pahlen
  - Brigade
    - Courland and Orenburg Dragoon Regiments
  - Brigade
    - Siberia and Irkutsk Dragoon Regiments
  - Brigade
    - Mariupol Hussar Regiment
  - Corps Artillery: One company
- Artillery Reserve: Count Kutaisov
  - 21 foot and five horse artillery companies
- Flying Cossack Corps: General of Cavalry Count Matvei Platov

Source: Pivka, Otto von (1979). Armies of the Napoleonic Era. New York, N.Y.: Taplinger Publishing. pp. 216–217. ISBN 0-8008-5471-3.
Source: Smith, Digby (1998). The Napoleonic Wars Data Book. London: Greenhill. p. 391. ISBN 1-85367-276-9.

== Second Western Army ==
General of the Infantry Prince Pyotr Bagration

- 7th Infantry Corps: Lieutenant General Nikolay Raevsky
  - 12th Infantry Division: Major General Illarion Vasilievich Vasilchokov
    - 1st Brigade
      - Smolensk and Narva Infantry Regiments
    - 2nd Brigade
      - Aleksopol and New Ingermanland Infantry Regiments
    - 3rd Brigade
      - 6th and 41st Jäger Regiments
  - 26th Infantry Division: Major General Ivan Paskevich
    - 1st Brigade
      - Ladoga and Poltava Infantry Regiments
    - 2nd Brigade
      - Nizhny Novgorod and Oryol Infantry Regiments
    - 3rd Brigade
      - 3rd, 5th and 42nd Jäger Regiments
  - Corps Artillery: Unknown
- 8th Infantry Corps: Lieutenant General Mikhail Borozdin
  - 2nd Grenadier Division: Major General Prince Karl von Mecklenburg
    - 1st Grenadier Brigade
      - Crimea and Moscow Grenadier Regiments
    - 2nd Grenadier Brigade
      - Astrakhan and Phanagoria Grenadier Regiments
    - 3rd Grenadier Brigade
      - Siberia and Little Russia Grenadier Regiments
  - 27th Infantry Division: Major General Dmitry Petrovich Neverovsky
    - 1st Brigade
      - Odessa and Zhitomir (or Tarnopol) Infantry Regiments
    - 2nd Brigade
      - Vilna and Simbirsk Infantry Regiments
    - 3rd Brigade
      - 49th and 50th Jäger Regiments
  - 3rd Grenadier Division
    - 22 combined grenadier battalions
  - Corps Artillery: Five companies
  - 2nd Cuirassier Division: Major General Ilya Mikhailovich Duka
    - 2nd Brigade
      - Yekaterinoslav and Military Order Cuirassier Regiments
    - 3rd Brigade
      - Glukhov, Little Russia and Novgorod Cuirassier Regiments
- 4th Reserve Cavalry Corps: Major General Count Karl Sivers
  - 12th Cavalry Brigade
    - Kharkov and Chernigov Dragoon Regiments
  - 13th Cavalry Brigade
    - Kiev and New Russian Dragoon Regiments
  - Cavalry Brigade
    - Akhtyrka Hussar and Lithuanian Uhlan Regiments
  - Corps Artillery: One company
- Cossack detachment: Major General Ivan K. Krasnov

Source: Pivka, Otto von (1979). Armies of the Napoleonic Era. New York, N.Y.: Taplinger Publishing. pp. 216–217. ISBN 0-8008-5471-3.
Source: Smith, Digby (1998). The Napoleonic Wars Data Book. London: Greenhill. pp. 391–392. ISBN 1-85367-276-9.

== 3rd Reserve Observation Army ==
General of cavalry Alexander Tormasov

- Infantry Corps: General of Infantry Sergei Kamensky
  - 18th Infantry Division
    - 1st Brigade
      - Vladimir and Tambov Infantry Regiments
    - 2nd Brigade
      - Kostroma and Dnieper Infantry Regiments
    - 3rd Brigade
      - 28th and 32nd Jäger Regiments
  - Combined Grenadier Division
    - 18 combined grenadier battalions
  - Corps Artillery: Four companies
  - Pavlograd Hussar Regiment
- Infantry Corps: Lieutenant General Yevgeni Ivanovich Markov
  - 9th Infantry Division
    - 1st Brigade
      - Nasheburg and Yakutsk Infantry Regiments
    - 2nd Brigade
      - Apsheron and Ryazhsk Infantry Regiments
    - 3rd Brigade
      - 10th and 38th Jäger Regiments
  - 15th Infantry Division
    - 1st Brigade
      - Kozlov and Vitebsk Infantry Regiments
    - 2nd Brigade
      - Kura and Kolyvan Infantry Regiments
    - 3rd Brigade
      - 13th and 14th Jäger Regiments
  - Corps Artillery: Seven companies
  - Alexandria Hussar Regiment
- Infantry Corps: Lieutenant General Baron Fabian Gottlieb von Osten-Sacken
  - 36th Infantry Division
    - Unknown composition
  - 11th Cavalry Division
    - Lubny Hussar Regiment, other units unknown
  - Corps Artillery: Two companies
- Cavalry Corps: Major General Count Charles de Lambert
  - 5th Cavalry Division
    - 15th Cavalry Brigade
      - Starodub and Tver Dragoon Regiments
    - 16th Cavalry Brigade
      - Arzamas and Zhitomir Dragoon Regiments
    - 17th Cavalry Brigade
      - Vladimir, Taganrog and Serpukhov Dragoon Regiments and Tartar Uhlan Regiment
  - Nine Cossack regiments

Source: Pivka, Otto von (1979). Armies of the Napoleonic Era. New York, N.Y.: Taplinger Publishing. ISBN 0-8008-5471-3.

== Danube Army ==
The Danube Army, commanded by Admiral Pavel Chichagov, included the:

- 1st Corps (General of cavalry Count Andrault de Langeron); made up of the:
  - 22nd Infantry Division
- 2nd Corps (Lieutenant General Count Pyotr Essen);
- 3rd Corps (Lieutenant General Alexander Voinov);
- 4th Corps (Lieutenant General Andreas Burchard Friedrich von Saß (Andrey Pavlovich Zass)); made up of the:
  - 8th Infantry Division
  - 7th Cavalry Division
- Reserve of the Army (Lieutenant General Ivan Sabaneev)

== Separate Corps and detachments ==
- Riga Corps (Lieutenant General Magnus Gustav (Ivan) von Essen)

=== Finland Corps ===
The Finland Corps consisted of the following units, under the command of Lieutenant General (Faddey) Fabian Steinheil:

- 6th Infantry Division
  - 1st Brigade
    - Bryansk and Nizov Infantry Regiments
  - 3rd Brigade
    - Azov Infantry and 3rd Jager Regiments
  - 6th Field Artillery Brigade
    - 6th Heavy and 11th Light Batteries
- 21st Infantry Division
  - 1st Brigade
    - Petrovsk and Podolia Infantry Regiments
  - 2nd Brigade
    - Neva and Lithuania Infantry Regiments
  - 3rd Brigade
    - 2nd and 44th Jager Regiments
  - 21st Field Artillery Brigade
    - 21st Heavy and 40th Light Batteries
- 25th Infantry Division
  - 1st Brigade
    - 1st and 2nd Marine Regiments
  - 2nd Brigade
    - 3rd Marine and Voronezh Infantry Regiments
  - 3rd Brigade
    - 31st and 47th Jager Regiments
  - 25th Field Artillery Brigade
- 27th Cavalry Brigade
  - Finland and Mitava Dragoon Regiments
- Isaev II, Loshchilin, and Kiselev II Don Cossack Regiments

=== Other separate units ===
- 1st Reserve Corps (Adjutant General Baron Yegor Meller-Zakomelsky);
- 2nd Reserve Corps (Lieutenant General Fyodor Ertell);
- Bobruysk detachment (Major General Gavriil Ignatyev);
- Smolensk Reserve Corps (General aide-de-camp Baron Ferdinand von Wintzingerode);
- Kaluga Reserve Corps (General of infantry Count of Serbian origin Mikhail Miloradovich);
- 27th Infantry Division (Major General Dmitry Neverovsky);
- Serbian detachment (Major General Nikolai Liders)

== See also ==
- French invasion of Russia
- Grande Armée
- List of Russian commanders in the Patriotic War of 1812
