= St. Nicholas' Church (Novocherkassk) =

Church in Rostov Oblast, Russia

- Церковь Николая Чудотворца
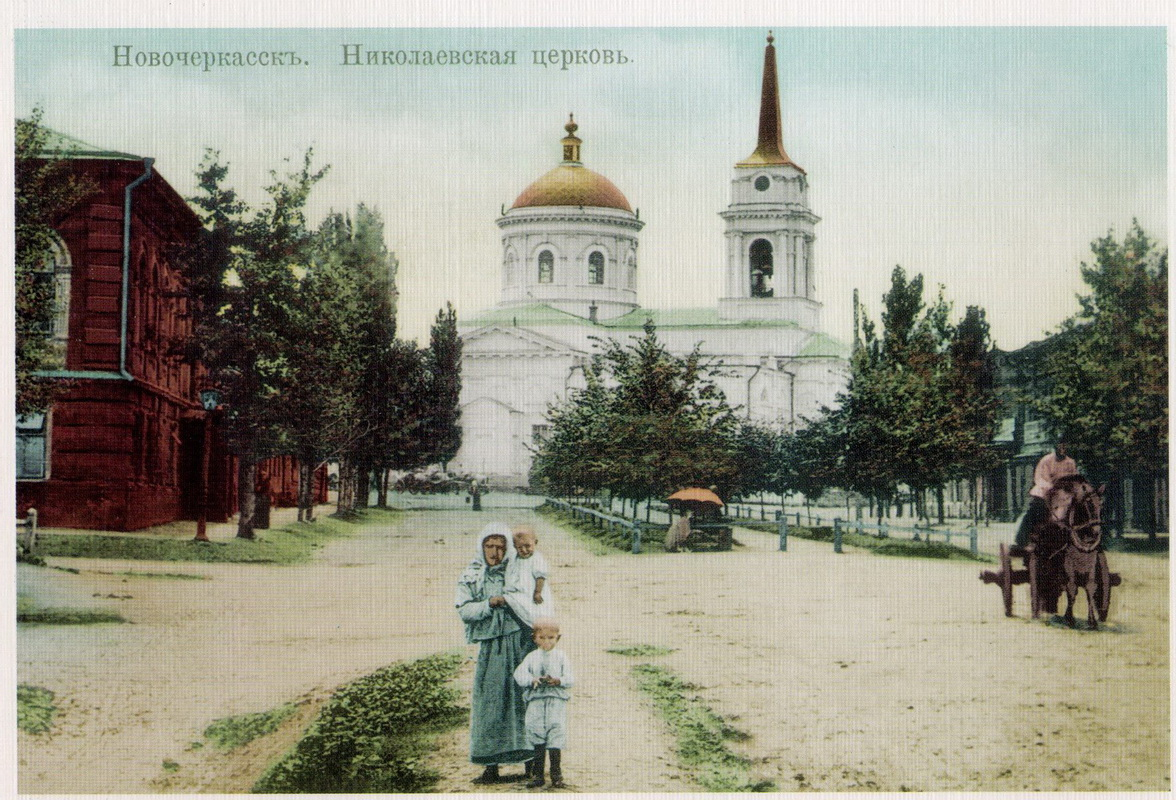
- St. Nicholas' Church pictured on a postcard, the beginning of the 20th century
- St. Nicholas' Church
- Location: Novocherkassk, Rostov Oblast, Russia
- Country: Russia
- Denomination: Russian Orthodox Church

History
- Status: Parish church
- Dedication: Saint Nicholas

Architecture
- Functional status: Destroyed
- Completed: 1812

The Saint Nicholas Church (Russian: Церковь Николая Чудотворца) was a Russian Orthodox church in Novocherkassk, Rostov Oblast, Russia.

== History ==
In Novocherkassk, on Pochtovaya Street at the distance of 300 metres from each other there were two St. Nicholas' churches: one was Orthodox on Nikolskaya Square (now Levski Square), and the other belonged to Old Believers community and was situated at the Alexander Garden.

The foundation stone of the wooden Church of St. Nicholas was solemnly laid down on August 14, 1810. The church was built in 1812. This church was erected at the insistence of the parishioners of St. Nicholas Church in Cherkassk, who were almost forcibly transferred to Novocherkassk on the order of ataman Matvey Platov. The construction was supervised by engineer-lieutenant-colonel Efimov. On July 22, 1812, the priest Nikolai Dolotin consecrated the newly built church.

The construction of a new stone church began in 1821, and it was consecrated in 1829. This church had two chapels: the right one was dedicated in honour of Holy Great Martyr Varvara and the left one―in honour of the Assumption of Mother of God. The project of the church was designed by architect Amvrosimov in Empire style. This church was one-storeyed, single-domed and built of white stone. The bell tower was attached to the main building.

The church was closed in 1935, and in 1939 it was dismantled. Now in Novocherkassk there is Levski Square at the place of it. On 19 November 1995 a large wooden cross was erected in memory of the ruined church of St. Nicholas. Later the wooden cross was replaced by a metal one.

Pochtovaya Street, the beginning of the 20th century

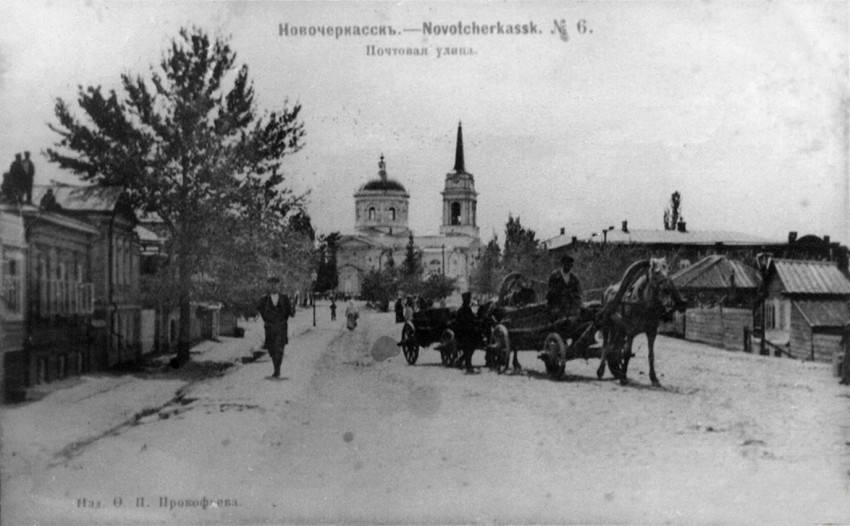

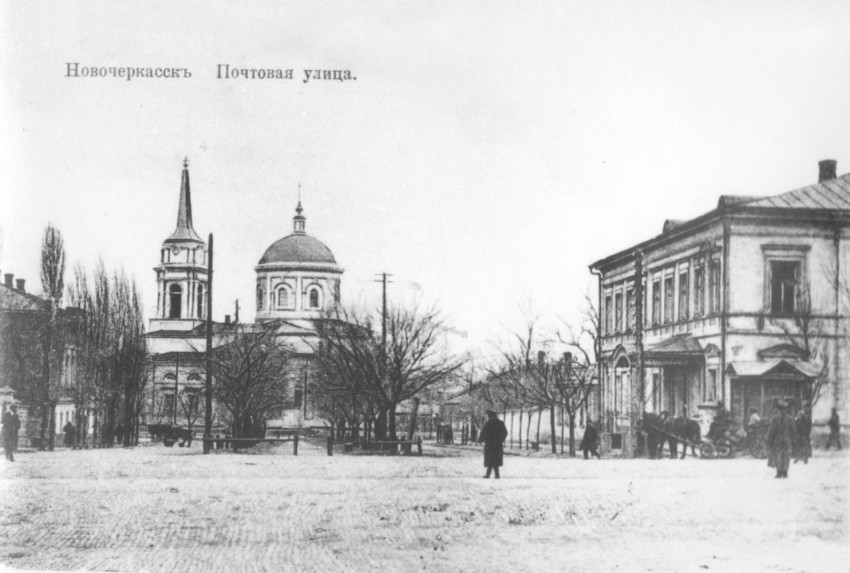
