= Battle of Inkovo =

1812 battle during the French invasion of Russia

- Part of the French invasion of Russia
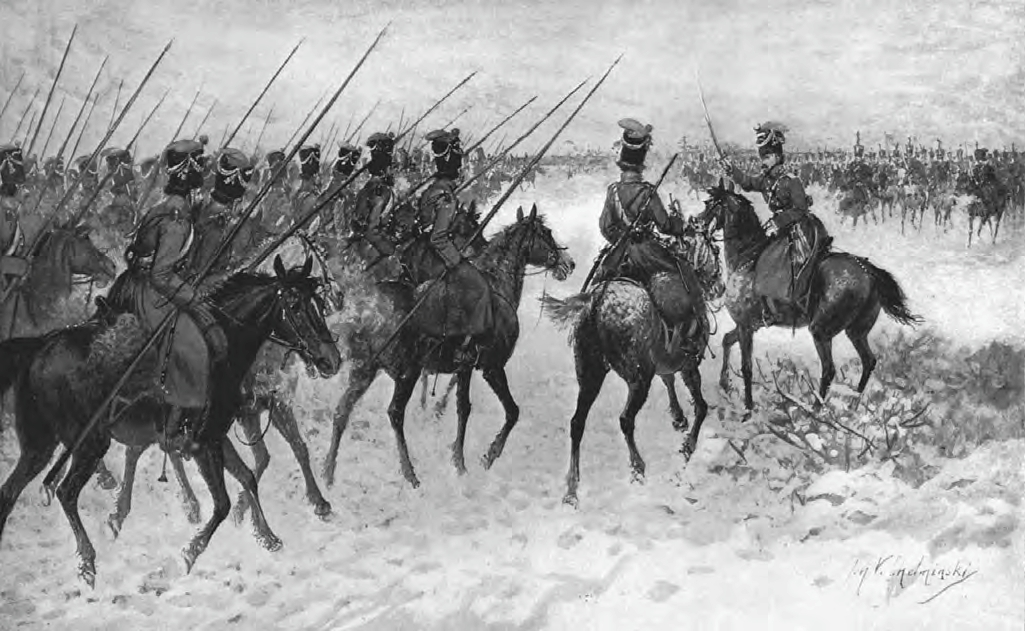
- Cossacks were an irregular Russian cavalry best suited for the attack of the enemy’s supply lines without joining a regular battle.
Date	8 August 1812
Location	Near Rudnya, Mogilev Governorate, Russian Empire 54°58′18″N 31°22′06″E
Result	Russian victory

Belligerents
(First French Empire) French Empire (Kingdom of Prussia) Prussia (Kingdom of Württemberg) Württemberg; Duchy of Warsaw	Russian Empire

Commanders and leaders
(First French Empire) General Sebastiani (Kingdom of Württemberg) Eberhard Graf von Waldburg Wurzach (POW)	(Russian Empire) Matvei Platov

Strength
2nd Light Cavalry Division	Cossack corps

Casualties and losses
600–1,200 killed or wounded, 300–500 captured	300 killed or wounded

French invasion of Russia
current battle
Prussian corps
Napoleon
Austrian corps

The Battle of Inkovo (Note: Known as the Battle of Молево Болото, Molevo Boloto, 'Molevo Swamp' as well.) took place on 8 August 1812, between the Cossack corps of General Platov and the 2nd Light Cavalry Division of General Sebastiani and ended as a minor Russian victory.

== Prelude ==
As Barclay de Tolly's and Pyotr Bagration's army were separated, Napoleon tried in vain to defeat them before they could unite. But Barclay de Tolly under political pressure had to attack Napoleon and the Russian offensive began west on the north bank of the Dnieper on 7 August, but relying on a false report Barclay de Tolly abandoned the move west.

== Battle ==
The altered orders had not reached General Platov on his advance and he clashed with General Sebastiani's 2nd Light Cavalry Division near Inkovo. The French were first forced to retreat. Being reinforced the French force then repulsed the pursuing Russians. The fighting ended three miles (4.8 km) east of Rudnya in the west of Inkovo.

== Aftermath ==
The battle of Inkovo was a Russian victory. The French casualties were 600 men, including 11 officers and 300 other ranks captured. The Russian offensive had been abandoned, allowing Napoleon to continue his attack on Smolensk.

== See also ==
- List of battles of the French invasion of Russia
