= Gavriil Ignatyev =

Russian general (1786–1852)

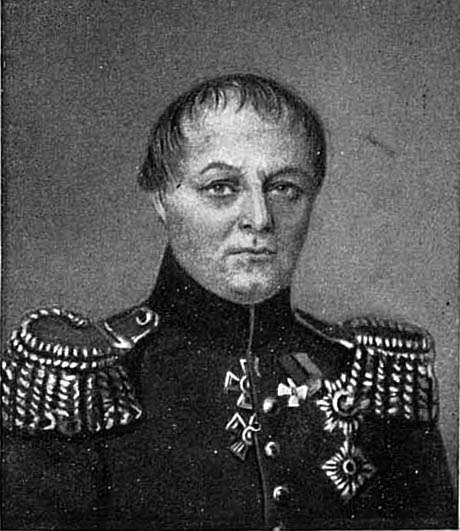
Gavriil Ignatyev

Gavriil Alexandrovich Ignatyev (Russian: Гаврии́л Алекса́ндрович Игна́тьев; 1769 – 5 April 1852) was an Imperial Russian Army general of artillery who led the defence of the Babruysk fortress and the city of Babruysk from Napoleon's forces in 1812.

== Honours and awards ==
- Order of St. Alexander Nevsky with diamonds
- Order of Saint Vladimir, 1st class
- Order of St. Anna, 1st class with diamond
- Order of St. George, 4th class
- Cross for Ishmael
- Badge "for L years irreproachable service"
