= Friedrich von Korff =

Freiherr Friedrich von Korff
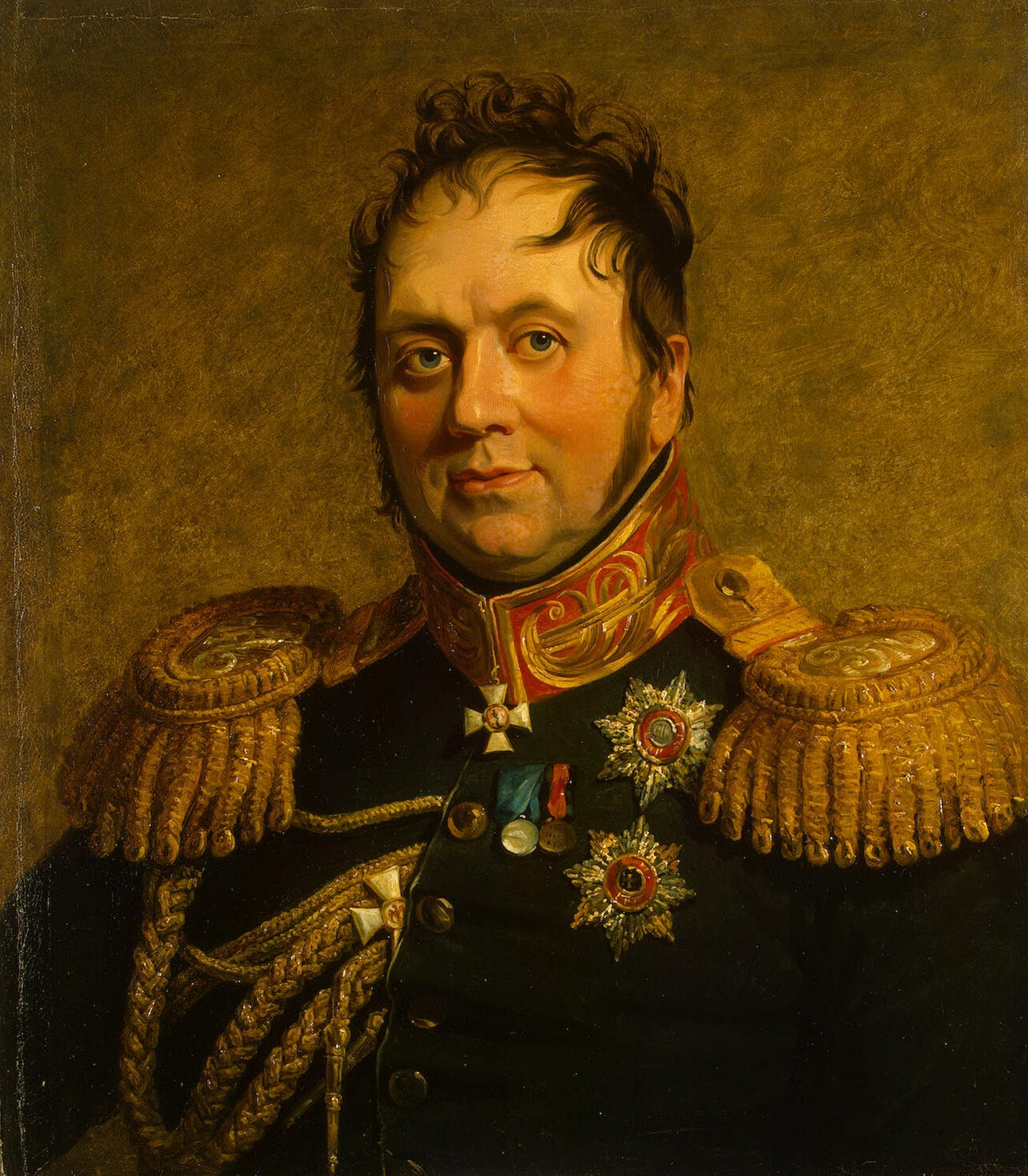
- Born: 5 April 1773
- Died: 11 September 1823 (aged 50)
- Other name: Fyodor Karlovich Korf
- Military career
- Allegiance: (Russia) Russian Empire
- Branch: Cavalry
- Rank: Lieutenant General
- Conflicts: War of the Fourth Coalition; Battle of Eylau; French invasion of Russia; Battle of Borodino; War of the Sixth Coalition; Battle of Katzbach; Battle of Leipzig; Battle of Laon; Battle of Fère-Champenoise; Battle of Paris

Friedrich Nikolai Georg Freiherr von Korff (5 April 1773 – 11 September 1823) was a Baltic German cavalry general, he commanded a Russian corps in 1812–1814 during the Napoleonic Wars. In 1807 he led a cavalry brigade in the 4th Division at Eylau. During the French invasion of Russia in 1812 he commanded the II Cavalry Corps at Borodino and Battle of Krasnoi. In 1813 he led the I Cavalry Corps at the Katzbach and Leipzig. In 1814 he led his horsemen at Laon, Fère-Champenoise and Paris.
