= Fyodor Ertell =

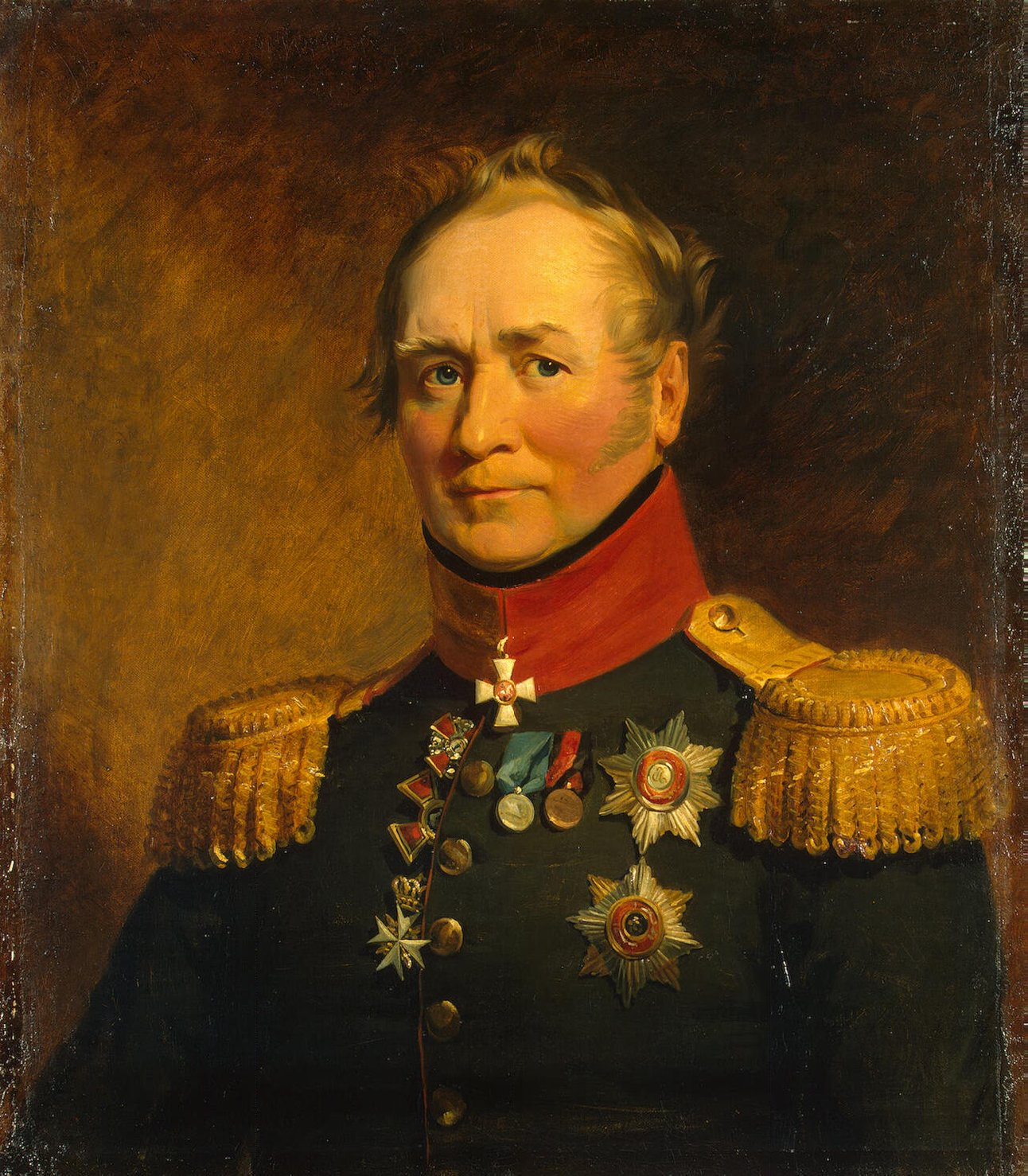
Portrait of Ertell by George Dawe

Fyodor Fedorovich Ertel (Russian: Фёдор Фёдорович Эртель; 12 January 1768, Labiau, Prussia - 8 April 1825, Mogilev) was a Prussian-born naval and army officer who served in the armed forces of the Russian Empire.

== Life ==
From an impoverished noble family in Prussia, he joined Smolensk military school as a Prussian officer cadet. In 1784 he received the rank of ensign but left the Prussian army later that year and emigrated to the Russian Empire, where he joined a naval battalion the following year. He volunteered for the Russo-Swedish War (1788–90) and served until losing his right eye on 23 August 1789. He was dismissed from the service in October 1789 but returned to the military on 12 November 1796, this time as an instructor in the army. He was soon promoted to major in the Grenadier Life Guards Regiment and he continued to rise after the accession of Paul I of Russia. In 1798 he was promoted to lieutenant colonel, major general and chief of police, gaining a reputation as exceptionally severe and rigorous.

== Sources ==
- Государственный Эрмитаж. Западноевропейская живопись. Каталог / под ред. В. Ф. Левинсона-Лессинга; ред. А. Е. Кроль, К. М. Семенова. — 2-е издание, переработанное и дополненное. — Л.: Искусство, 1981. — Т. 2. — С. 261, кат.№ 7840. — 360 с.
