= Matvei Platov =

General of the Imperial Russian Army

Ataman, Count Matvei Ivanovich Platov
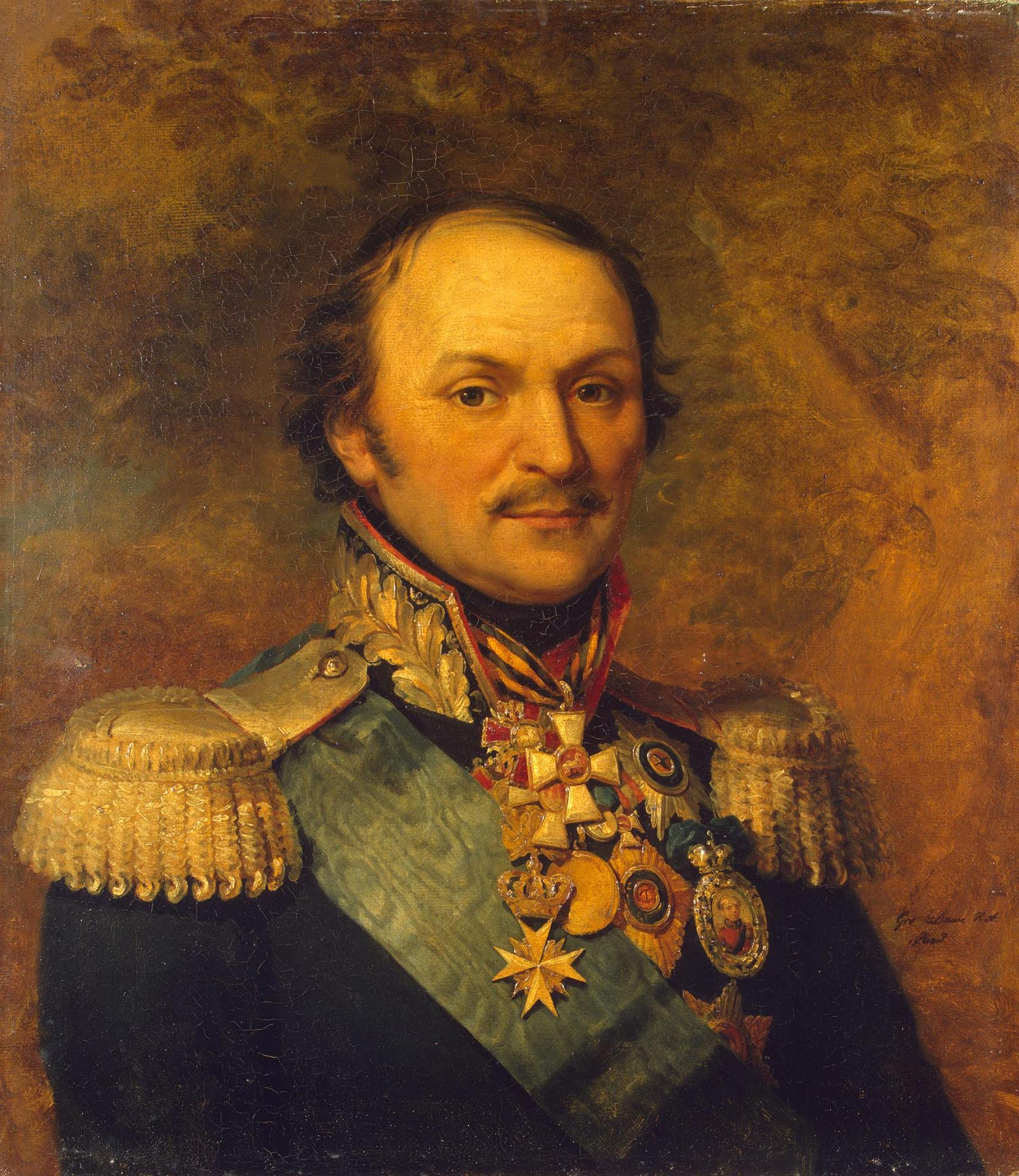
- Portrait by George Dawe
- Born: 19 August [O.S. 8 August] 1753 in Cherkassk, Don Host Province, Russian Empire
- Died: 15 January [O.S. 3 January] 1818; Epanchitskoe near Taganrog, Russian Empire
- Military career
- Allegiance: Russian Empire
- Branch: Imperial Russian Army
- Service years: 1769–1818
- Rank: General of the cavalry
- Conflicts: Russo-Turkish War (1787–1792); Persian expedition of 1796; Napoleonic Wars: Battle of Friedland; Battle of Grodno (1812); Battle of Mir (1812); Battle of Inkovo; Battle of Borodino; Battle of Leipzig

Count Matvei or Matvey Ivanovich Platov (Russian: Матвей Иванович Платов; 8 [19 N.S.] August 1753 – 3 [15 N.S.] January 1818) was a Russian general who commanded the Don Cossacks in the Napoleonic Wars and founded Novocherkassk as the new capital of the Don Host Province.

== Biography ==
Platov was born in Pribilyanskoe (stanitsa in former Starocherkasskaya), into a family of Greek descent. He began his service in the Don Cossacks in 1766 becoming an yesaul in 1769. He distinguished himself in the 1771 Crimean campaign and was promoted to the command of a Cossack regiment in 1772. Between 1774 and 1784 he fought against the Crimean Tatars, in 1774 and again in 1782 serving under Alexander Suvorov in the Kuban Valley, Chechnya and Dagestan. In 1790 he was awarded the Order of St George (4th Class) for his participation in the capture of Ochakov, and after actions in Akkerman, Bender, and Kaushani for which he was promoted to brigadier general, he was awarded the Order of St George (3rd Class) for the storming of Izmail. For his bravery during the assault he was promoted to ataman of the Ekaterinoslav and Chuguev Cossacks, and on 12 January 1793 he was promoted to major-general. During 1796 he was awarded the Order of St. Vladimir (3rd class) and a golden sword for courage in the Persian Campaign.

Disgraced by the Emperor Paul I of Russia as a result of rumours spread by the emperor's courtiers, he was exiled to Kostroma, but later confined to the Peter and Paul Fortress. However, after verifying his innocence, the Emperor awarded him the Commander's Cross of the Order of St. John of Jerusalem. Unfortunately, this also led to his appointment to the ill-fated and ill-conceived Russian expedition to India in 1800. Although the expedition only reached Orenburg, Platov was promoted to Lieutenant-General and pokhodny/pokhidnii ataman ("marching ataman"; campaign Cossack leader) of the Don Cossacks with a transfer to their HQ at Novocherkassk.

Upon Alexander I's accession to the throne, he was appointed ataman of the Don Cossacks. In 1805, he ordered the Cossack capital to be moved from Starocherkassk to a new location, known as Novocherkassk.

During the Polish campaign of 1806–1807, Platov commanded a Cossack corps and fought against the French at the battles of Eylau, Guttstadt and Friedland, receiving the orders of St. George (2nd class), of St. Alexander Nevsky, and the Prussian orders of the Black Eagle and of the Red Eagle. In 1808–1809, he was active against the Turks in the Danube valley, including at the Battle of Silistra, receiving for it the Order of St. Vladimir (1st class). On 11 October 1809 Platov was promoted to General of Cavalry. Soon after the end of the campaign he returned to the Don Host and continued the reorganisation of the local Cossack administration.

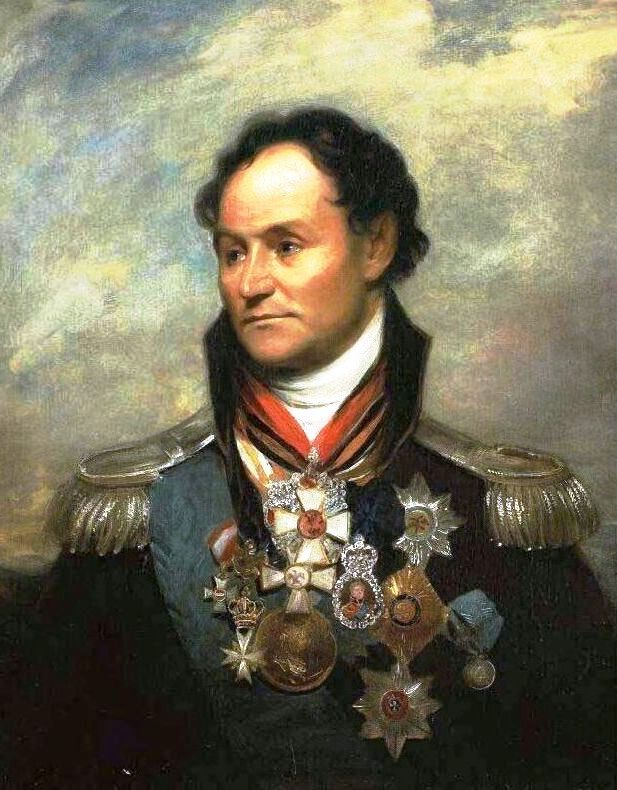
Platov's portrait, commissioned in 1814 from William Beechey by Lord Beresford

In 1812, Platov supported General Bagration's 2nd Western Army with a Cossack corps at the Korelichi engagement, at Mir and at Romanovo, providing the rear guard during their retreat towards Mogilyov. During the Russian counter-attack at Smolensk Platov fought at Molevo Boloto. At the Battle of Borodino he, together with General of Cavalry Fyodor Uvarov, conducted a manoeuver against the French left (northern) flank, but failed to effectively threaten the French, resulting in Platov not receiving a decoration for the battle although ironically it was later disclosed that this raid had a dramatic effect on Napoleon, causing him to hold back the French Imperial Guard. He hounded the French during their retreat from Moscow in 1812, (for which he received the title of Count of the Russian Empire), and again after their defeat at the Battle of Leipzig 1813 in Saxony (see Battle of Altenburg, 28 September 1813).

Platov later accompanied emperor Alexander to London where he was awarded a golden sword. A full-length portrait was painted by Sir Thomas Lawrence for the Waterloo Chamber created at Windsor Castle by George IV, then prince regent. Platov then settled in the Cossack capital of Novocherkassk where he established a school and was head of the local administration. He died, aged 67, in Epanchitskoe (near Taganrog). He is buried in Novocherkassk Cathedral.

== Legacy ==
The first monument to Platov, which existed from 1853 to 1923 in Novocherkassk, was replicated there in 1993. There are also equestrian monuments to him in Novocherkassk, Rostov-on-Don and Moscow. Gavrila Derzhavin dedicated the last of his odes to Platov's exploits. In Leskov's Levsha (1881), Don Cossack Platov is a prominent figure, even though his portrayal in that folk-styled tale is full of anachronisms.

An international airport that serves Rostov-on-Don and opened in 2017 was named after Platov. A street in the historic old town of Niagara-on-the-Lake, Ontario, Canada is also named after Platov. It is spelled Platoff Street.

From May 1813 to the present, at least 18 ships have been named after ataman of the Don Army M.I. Platov (see list of ships named Platov or Platoff).^{Ru}

Matvei Platov is the patron of the 6th Separate Guards Cossack Motor Rifle Brigade of the Russian Ground Forces.

Paintings of Platov or related:
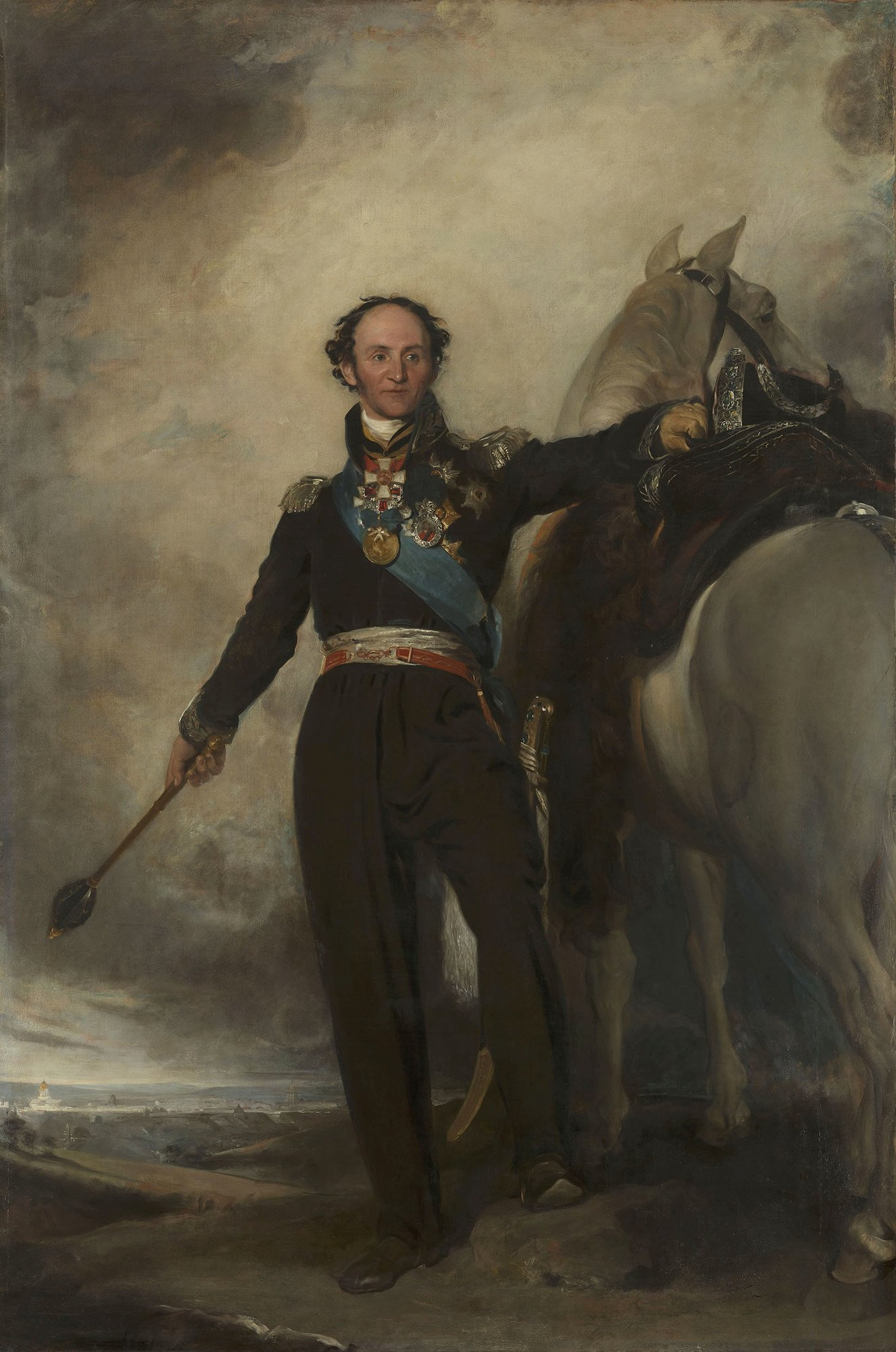
By Thomas Lawrence – Royal Collection

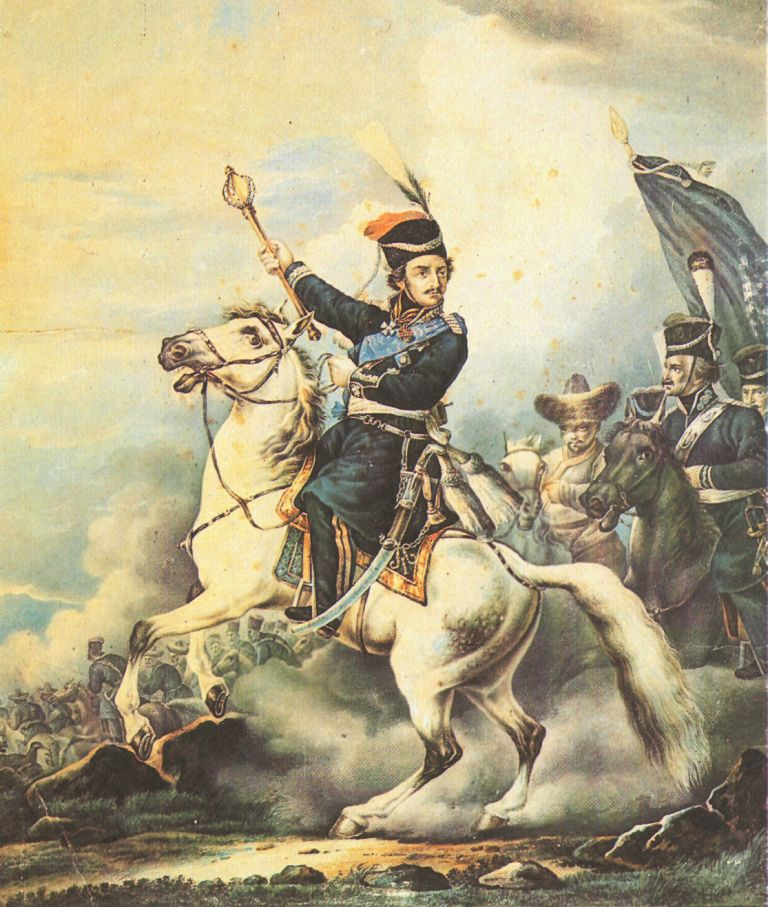
By Aleksander Orłowski – State Historical Museum

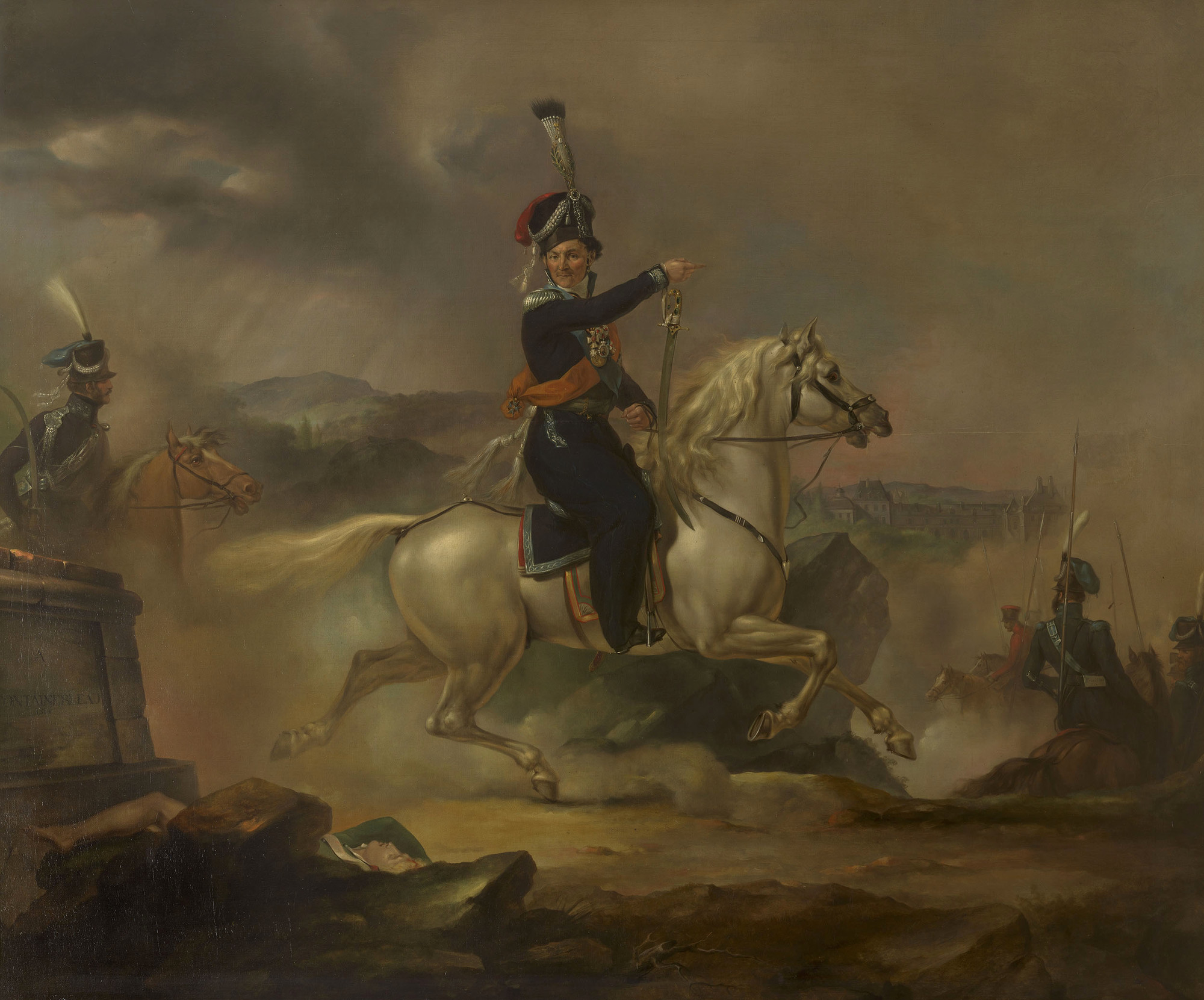
By Peter Edward Stroehling

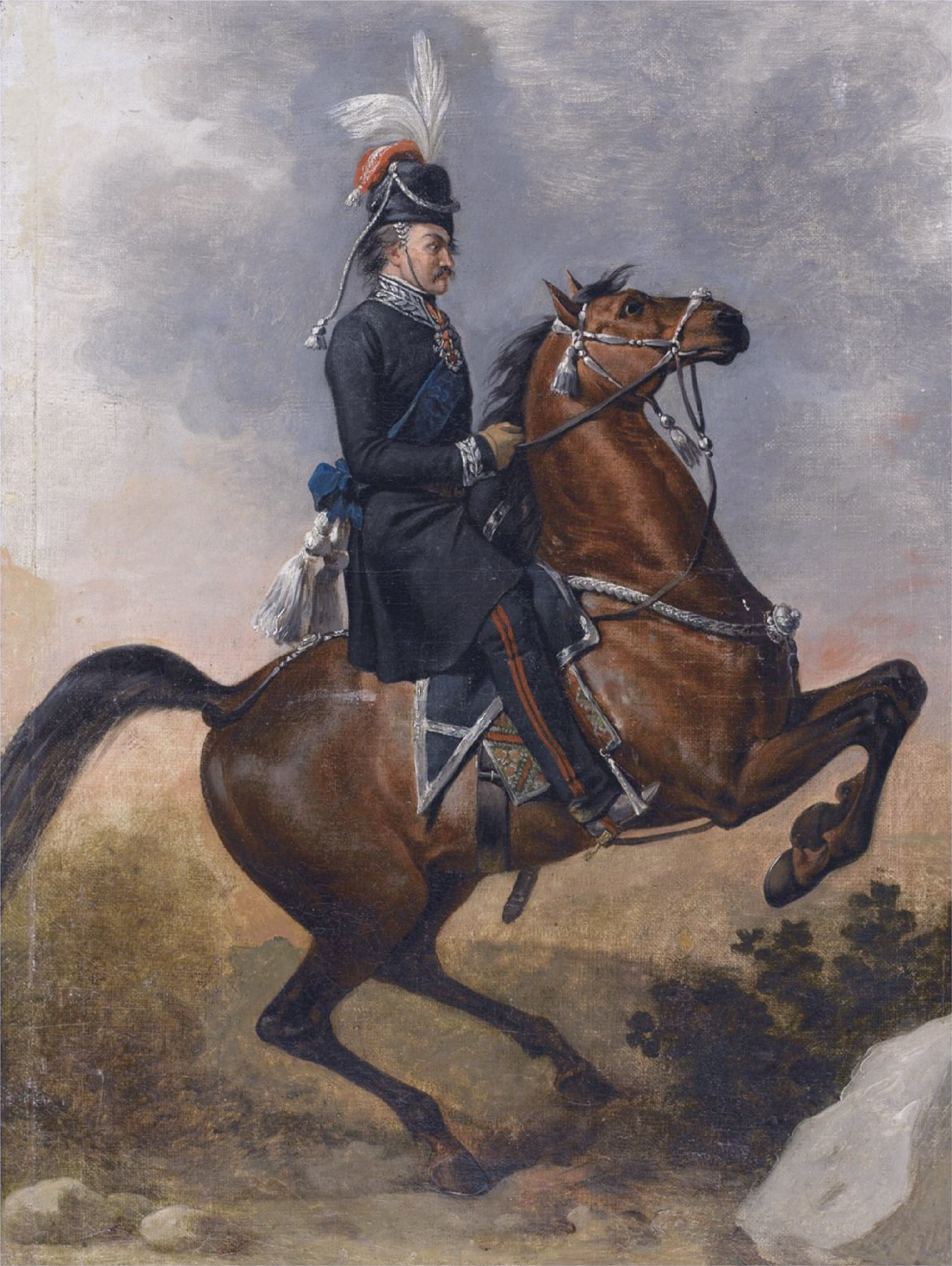
Unknown author

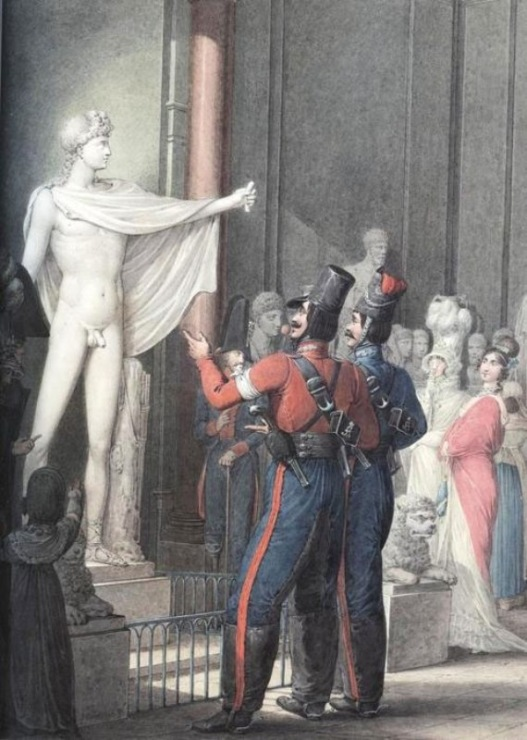
The Cossacks in the Louvre at the statue of Apollo Belvedere shortly after the capture of Paris (1814). By Georg Emanuel Opiz

== Sources ==
- Mikaberidze, Alexander, The Russian Officer Corps of the Revolutionary and Napoleonic Wars, Savas Beatie, New York, 2005
