= 1st Swiss Regiment (France) =

- 1er Régiment Suisse
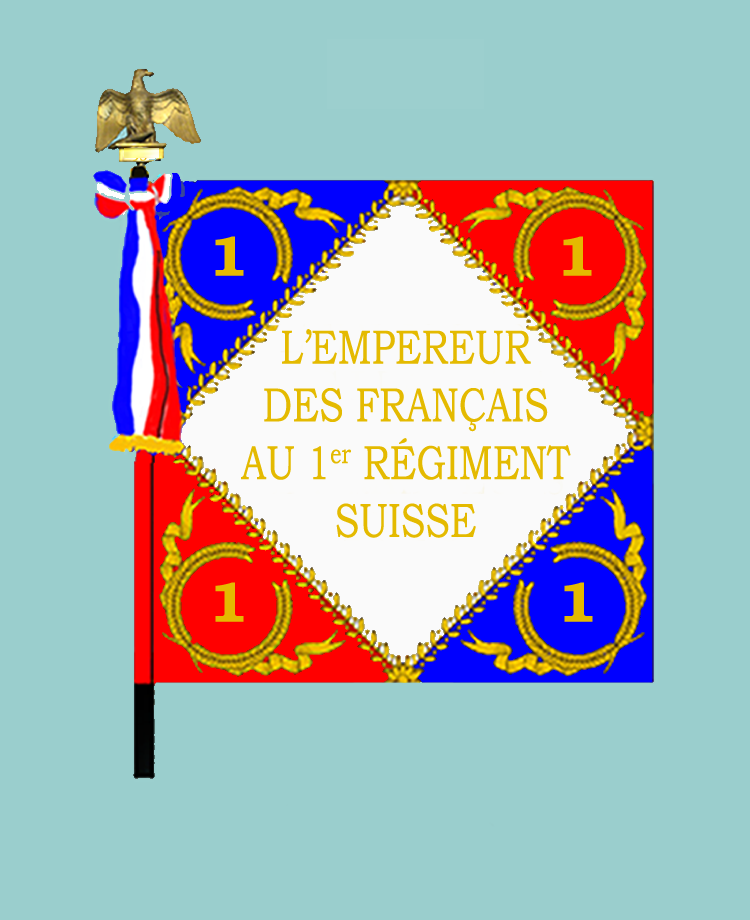
- Regimental colours of the 1st Swiss pre-1812
- Active: 15 March 1805–1815; 1815–1830
- Country: (Switzerland) Swiss Confederation
- Allegiance: First French Empire; Kingdom of France
- Branch: French Imperial Army (Kingdom of France) French Royal Army
- Type: Line Infantry
- Size: Largest at 3 battalions
- Part of: Swiss Corps
- Depot: Zürich, Swiss Confederation
- Engagements: Napoleonic Wars; Invasion of Naples; Battle of Maida; Russian Campaign; First Battle of Polotsk; Second Battle of Polotsk; Battle of Berezina; War of the Sixth Coalition; Siege of Bremen; Blockade of Maastricht

The 1st Swiss Regiment (French: 1er Régiment Suisse) was a Swiss mercenary line infantry regiment in the French Imperial Army during the Napoleonic Wars. During the expansion of the Imperial Army in 1803, Napoleon decreed the formation of four Swiss mercenary regiments, one of these later becoming the famed 1st Swiss. After a short time serving in Southern Italy, notably serving at the Battle of Maide, the 1st Swiss were sent to Poland for the impending Invasion of Russia. During the invasion, the regiment remained in the reserve, but served with honour, notably at the Battles of Polotsk and later the crossing of the Berezina. After retreating from Russia, elements of the regiment served during the minor campaigns until May 1814. The regiment was then reformed under the Bourbon restored monarchy, and continued into the Royal Guard until its final disbandment in 1830.

== Formation ==
On 27 November 1803, authorised articles were signed in which a new Swiss infantry regiment was to be created. However, it was not until March 1805, just before the Ulm Campaign, that the new French emperor, Napoleon, ordered the reorganisation of the Swiss troops by imperial decree. The remaining three Swiss Demi-brigades, which were the result of the merger of the original six Swiss demi-brigades of the Helvetic Legion. The men of these remaining small units were merged to form the new 1st Swiss Regiment, formed by imperial decree on 15 March 1805. The 1st Swiss Demi-Brigade was based in La Rochelle, where it was dissolved on 11 May 1805 to provide the 3rd Battalion of the new regiment. The 2nd Swiss Demi-Brigade formed the 4th Battalion a month later when it was based in Livorno. The 3rd Swiss Demi-Brigade was split, sourcing the personnel for the 1st and 2nd Battalions on 5 July 1805 while in Bastia, Corsica.

Napoleon took pains over their formation, demanding that the French rather than the Swiss authorities select officers and personnel appointing those above the rank of major. He also had to approve all Grenadier Company (Compagnie des Grenadiers) officers, from names put forth by the Colonel-General of the Swiss (a French appointment, held in 1808 by Maréchal d’Empire Jean Lannes). To ensure that the Swiss Confederation did not evolve military institutions that would attract volunteers away from his Swiss regiments, Napoleon forbade developing Swiss general staff academies and limited the home forces to a self-defence militia of no more than 20,000 men.

Though the majority of the recruits for the new regiment came from the now disbanded Swiss demi-brigades, the battalions of 1st Swiss Infantry Regiment were now spread out between Northern Italy, Corsica, and Elba was not declared fully operational until 4 July 1806 – and even then, with only 2,887 men, to be increased by piecemeal arrivals from Switzerland over the following months.

== War of the Third Coalition ==
In 1805, according to regimental records, parts of the regiment was embarked on the Mediterranean Squadron's ships at the Battle of Trafalgar, where one officer was wounded. By mid-1805, the regiment was consolidated within the new Kingdom of Italy with the Staff and 1st Battalion based at Bastia, the 2nd Battalion on Elba, the 3rd Battalion near Modena, and 4th Battalion in Genoa.

=== 4th Battalion ===
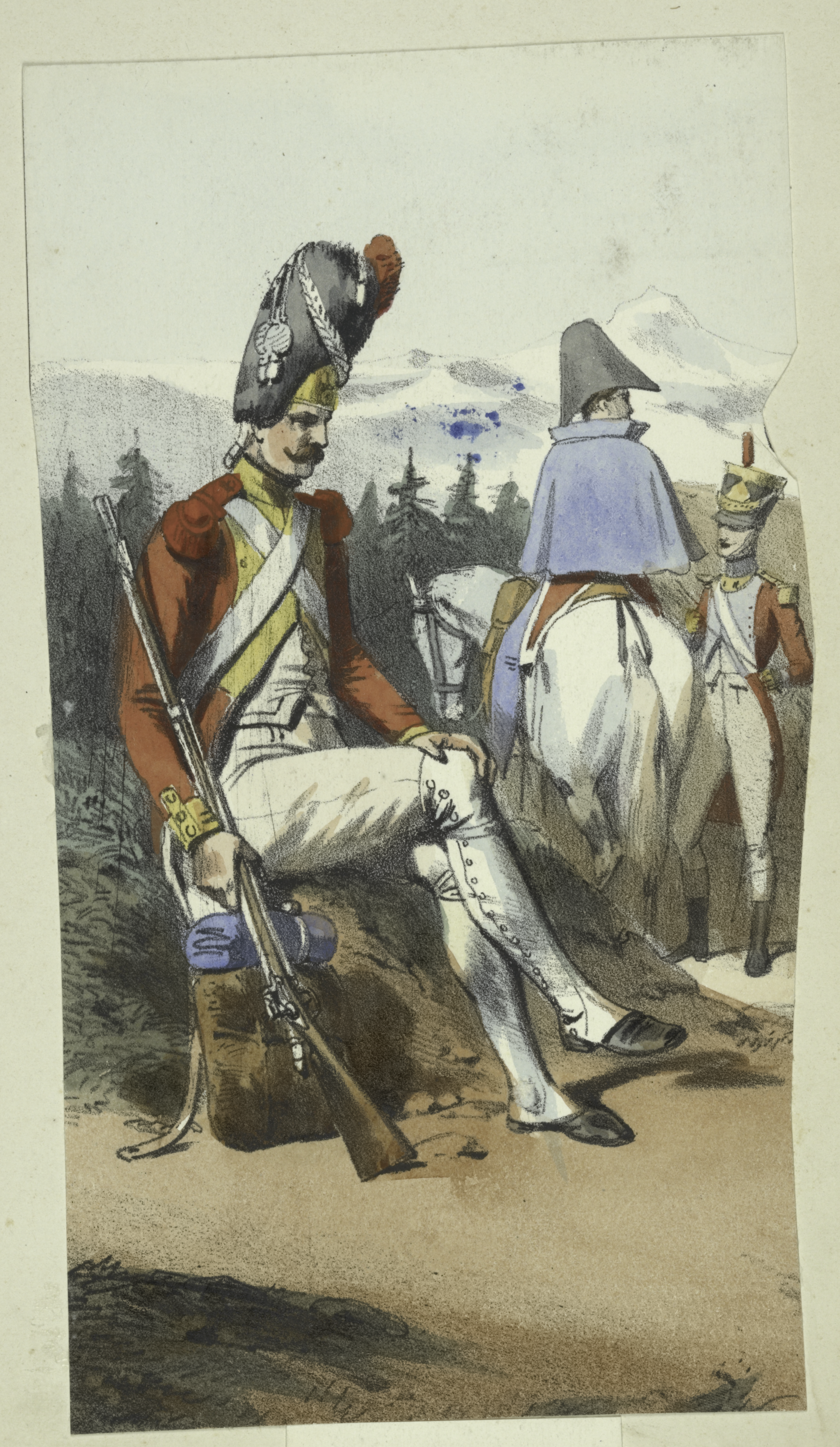
A grenadier and officers of the regiment in Italy in 1807

The 4th Battalion under Louis Clavel was detached to the Right Wing Division of the Army of Italy and fought at the Battle of Castelfranco Veneto where three officers were wounded. During the remainder of the campaign, the battalion was composed of 666 troops.

The 4th Battalion was still in the Right Wing, being involved in the Invasion of Naples under General de Division Jean Reynier, a fellow countryman. Their participation in the invasion was well noted, especially at the Battle of Maida, where the story of the Swiss is not as well known as their British victors.

==== Maida ====
Towards the end of the battle, the French right-wing broke, and because the British mistook the 1st Swiss as the British De Watteville's Regiment; because of the almost identical uniform; the 78th (Highlanders) Regiment of Foot allowed the 1st Swiss to advance within very close range. The 1st Swiss then fired a volley and caused mass casualties in the regiment and increased confusion as the 78th thought this was a friendly fire incident. When the 78th realised their mistake, it was too late, and they began to retreat. The 78th then reformed and pushed back the 1st Swiss towards Dignoet's Brigade, where the 1st Swiss began to retire slowly and in good order.

Following the end of the battle, the 1st Swiss were grouped with the 23rd Light Infantry Regiment, and 9th Mounted Chasseurs along with four 6-pounder cannons to cover the army's retreat. At the battle, the 1st Swiss with 600 men engaged, lost 82 men killed or wounded and 55 taken prisoner. However, these returns are disputed as official British returns show some 102 Swiss prisoners of war after the battle. Among the officers, one was killed, one mortally wounded, and four wounded, with Chef de Bataillon Clavel included amongst the latter. He was rescued by the British De Watteville's Regiment, who organised his exchange for French prisoners. However, his wounds were very severe, and he ultimately died from their effects on 23 July 1808, over two years after they were inflicted.

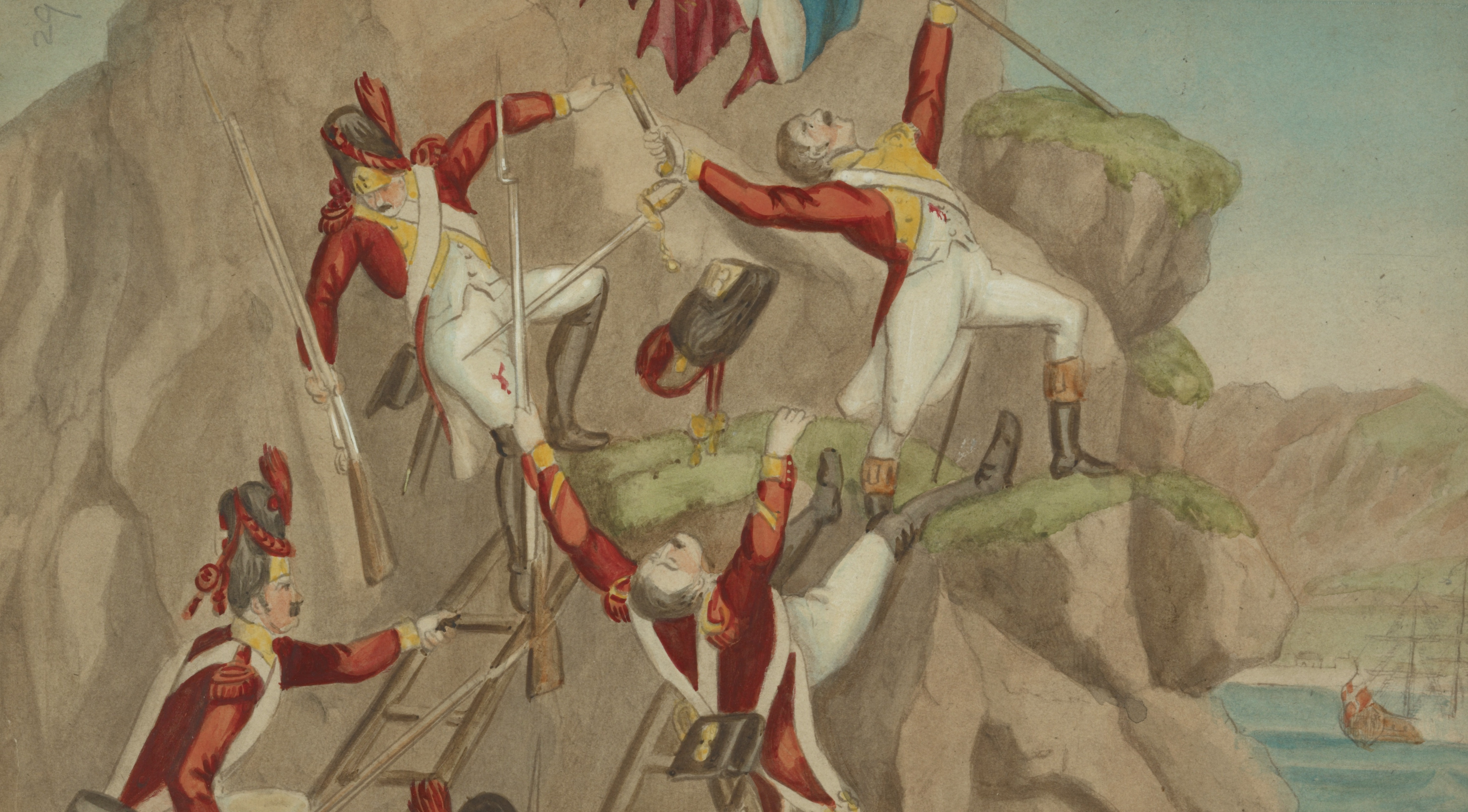
Swiss grenadiers conducting a raid in Calabria in 1807

==== Calabria ====
Following the disaster at Maida, the populace of Calabria (a fiercely pro-Bourbon province of the newly created Kingdom of Naples) rebelled against King Joseph Bonaparte. On 5 July 1806, the regiment and the remainder of Reynier's army were still retreating when it came upon the village of Marcellinara, desperate for food and water. To the amazement of the French, they were welcomed enthusiastically by the populace shouting "Long live the English" and "Death to the French", once again because they were mistaken for British soldiers. However, this comical situation ended tragically, when the Swiss opened fire on the populace, and the village was sacked.

=== 3rd Battalion ===
The 3rd Battalion was originally also scheduled for inclusion in the Army of Naples. Still, it was diverted to assist in the suppression of a significant uprising by Italian peasants in Parma, Piacenza, and the Trebbia Valley in January 1806. The incident, involving upwards of 20,000 inhabitants driven to insurrection by the abuses of the occupying French forces, gave the Swiss a taste of the type of action they would encounter again in Calabria. The 3rd Battalion finally made it to Naples in September 1806, followed shortly thereafter by the 1st and 2nd Battalions. The 4th Battalion was held back at Naples because it still had not made good the losses suffered at the Battle of Maida, but the other three battalions were plunged into the fighting in 1807 as the French attempted to pacify Calabria once and for all.

==== Calabrian Campaign ====
Throughout the Cambrian campaign, the 1st Swiss proved themselves as a distinguished anti-partisan unit. The 1st Battalion even managed to distinguish itself at the crucial Siege of Cotrone at the end of June, when two of its offices earned the Legion of Honour. Because of its reliability in the field, Joseph Bonaparte of the new Kingdom of Naples conceived a plan of transferring the 1st Swiss Regiment into its own nascent Neapolitan Army and even persuaded Napoleon to permit that. He negotiated a convention to that effect in December 1807. Yet, it was not ratified by all the Swiss cantonal governments until June of the following year, by which time Joseph had already accepted a transfer to the throne of Spain. His successor, King Joachim Murat, decided it would be an insult to his new subjects to allow foreigners in his army, so the plan was never implemented.

However, the new King did not object to the regiment's continued use in the vanguard of his military endeavours. The Grenadiers, Voltigeurs, and battalion artillery of the regiment were consequently included in the elite force that stormed the island of Capri in October 1808 and captured the British garrison commanded by General Sir Hudson Lowe. The following year, the 1st Swiss also played a prominent part in defending Capri and nearby coastal targets. The 1st Swiss suffered some combat casualties as a result of these endeavours, but the real enemy turned out to be the malaria that was endemic around the Bay of Naples, which killed nearly 800 men (including some who became so depressed by the disease that they committed suicide).

In 1810, the 1st and 2nd Battalions, the elite companies (Grenadiers and Voltigeurs) of the 3rd and 4th Battalions, and the regimental artillery company were all assigned to the force that King Joachim Murat concentrated at the toe of Italy in August to launch an invasion of Sicily. That plan was abandoned after two Neapolitan battalions made their way to the shores of Sicily and were captured en masse, and the various components of the 1st Swiss were dispersed to a variety of garrisons and duties in lower Calabria. Finally, in July 1811, the 1st Swiss received a reprieve from its hard labours in the form of a summons to re-join the main French armies after an absence of over five years.

== Invasion of Russia ==
=== Preparations ===
As Napoleon's new Grande Armée assembled in the eastern parts of the Duchy of Warsaw, the need for Swiss troops became apparent. Napoleon even said, "We must pay serious attention to the Swiss regiments". He went on to call for a major effort to recruit the regiments up to strength and bring about their organisation. As a result, over the next year's course, the regiments were gradually reassembled, and each received a new regimental artillery company. Each artillery company composed of two 3-pounder mountain field cannons.

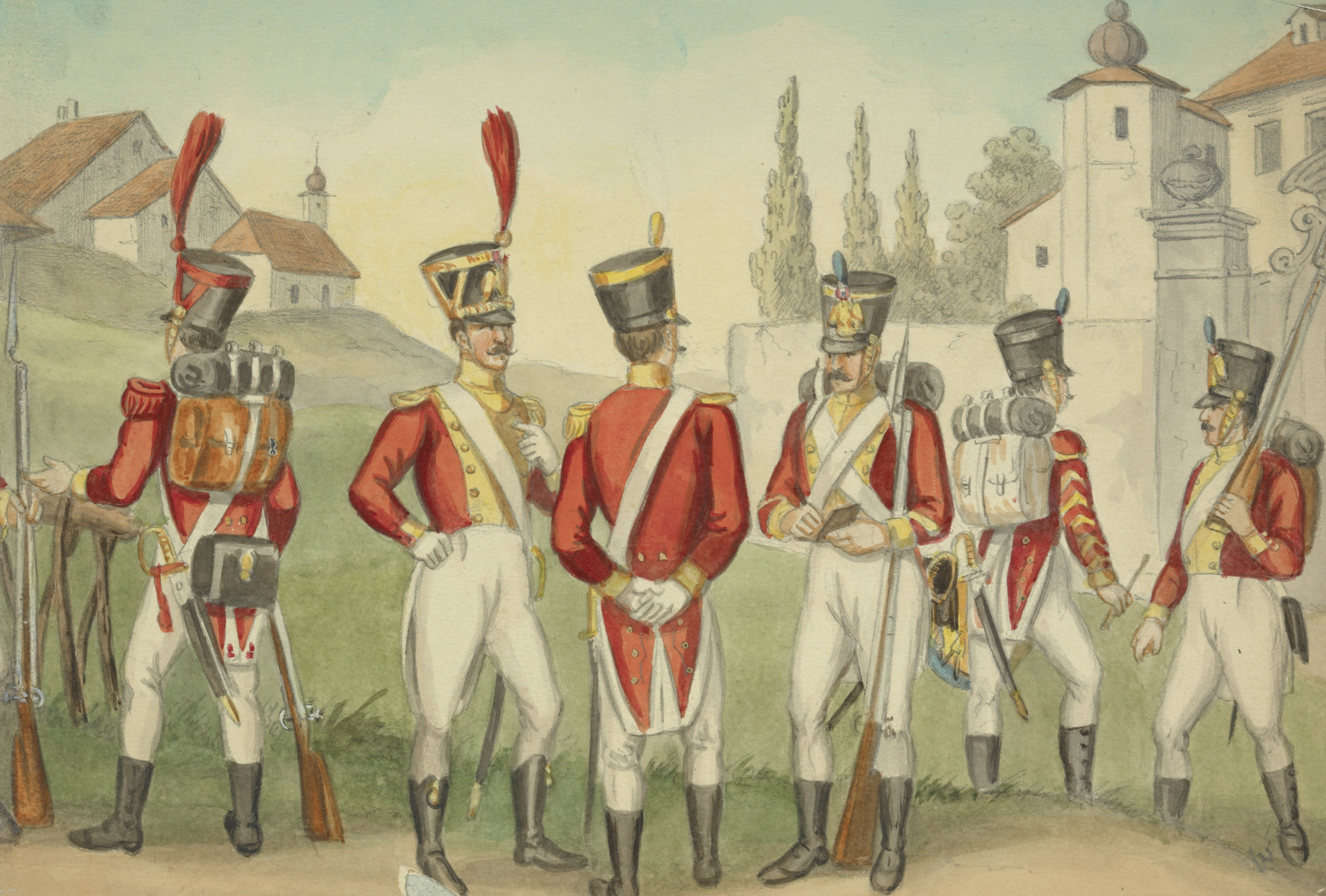
Fusiliers, grenadiers and drummers of the regiment in 1812

The initiative also resulted in a re-negotiation of the convention governing the four Swiss regiments, after Napoleon decided that he preferred four smaller full-strength regiments rather than four larger ones which never came close to their prescribed establishment. Therefore, the overall Swiss contingent was reduced to 12,000 men and changed the composition of each regiment:

- Each Regiment to have a Regimental Staff, 3 x Active Battalions, 1 x Depot Demi-Battalion and 1 x Regimental Artillery Company (as described beforehand)
- Each Active Battalion will consist of: 1 x Grenadier, 4 x Fusilier, and 1 x Voltigeur Companies of 140 men each

Under Article 9 of the new conventions, the Swiss government was required to produce a steady stream of 2,000 replacements a year to keep up with attrition, with an extra 1,000 per annum required in case of the outbreak of war in Germany or Italy.

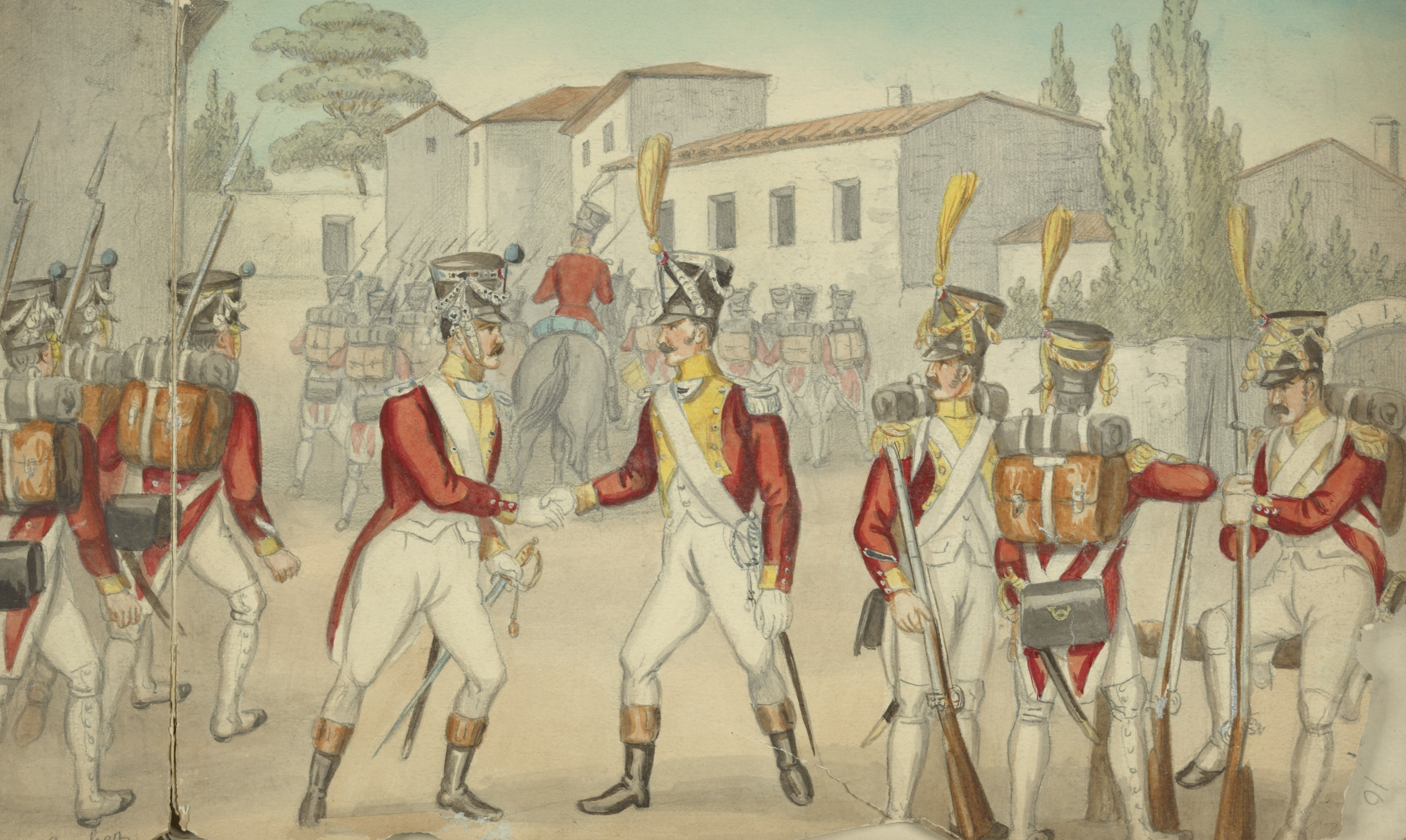
Fusiliers and voltigeurs of the regiment in 1812

By 1812 following the reorganisations of the previous year, the 1st Swiss were reorganised into two active battalions with a total strength of 2,103. According to Dempsey, only two battalions were active at this time, though the regiment was actually the most numerous, with the 2nd Swiss Regiment being just behind in three battalions with 1,822 troops. By the time of the beginning of the Invasion of Russia, all Swiss regiments were grouped for the first time in Maréchal d’Empire Nicolas Oudinot's II Corps. the 1st and 2nd Swiss Regiments were grouped into General de Brigade Jacques Savettier de Candras's Brigade, which in turn was paired with Coutard's Brigade (3rd Swiss and 128th Line) and Amey's Brigade (4th Swiss and 3rd Provisional Croats) in General Merle's Division.

On most levels, Napoleon's campaign against Russia was a hugely complex series of events. For the Swiss regiments, it was much simpler – it consisted of three major engagements separated by long stretches of inactivity. The First Battle of Polotsk and Second Battle of Polotsk are amongst the least known actions of the campaign because they took place far from the watchful eye of Napoleon. However, the Battle of Berezina is better known, but the role played by the Swiss in that engagement is not always clearly described. Still, in all three instances, the Swiss covered themselves with glory and provided some of the most heroic episodes in the story of Napoleon's foreign troops.

=== First Battle of Polotsk ===
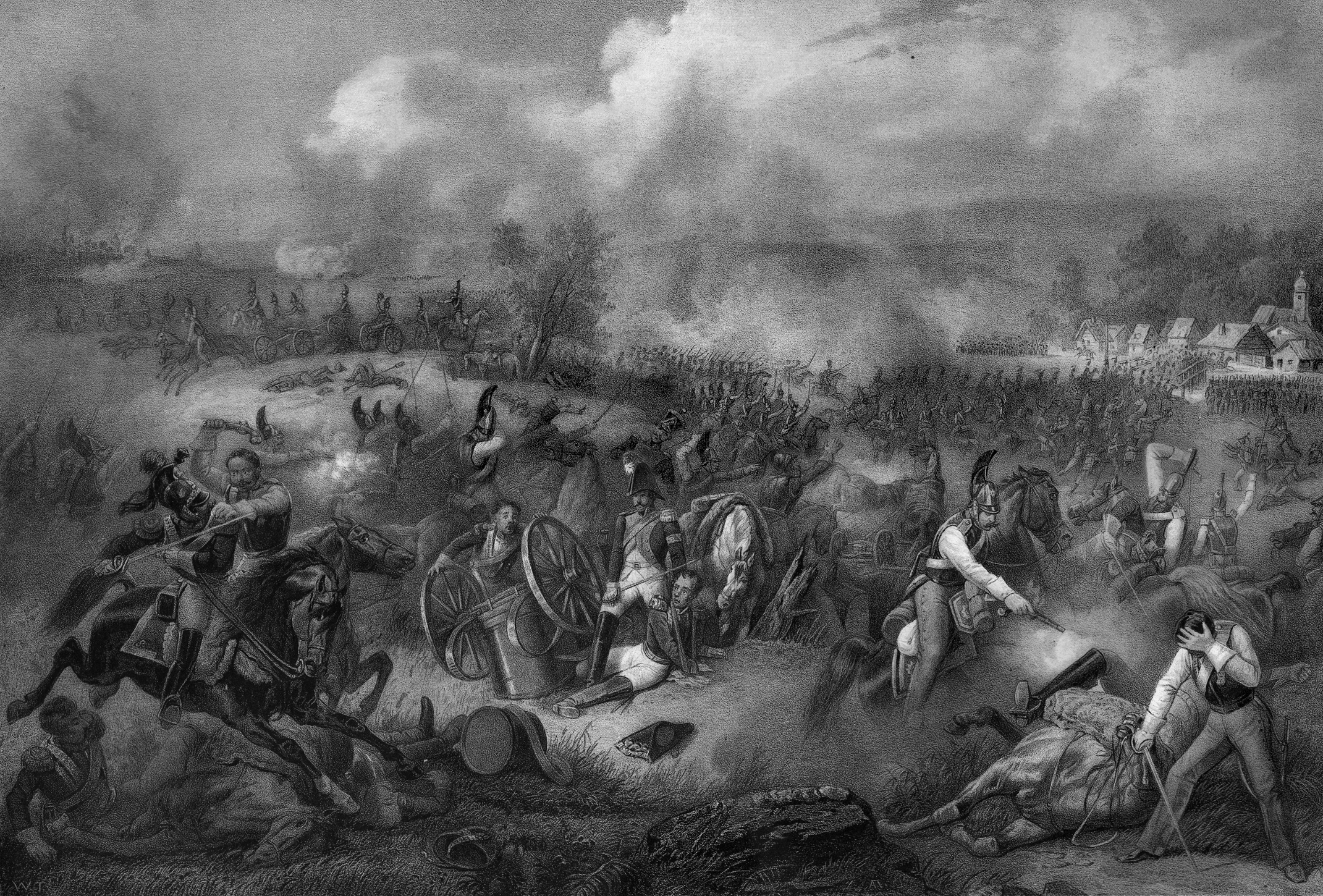
Scene from the First Battle of Polotsk.

At the very beginning of the invasion, the II Corps was detached along with Maréchal d'Empire Étienne Macdonald's X Corps to guard the left, or northern, flank of the advancing Grande Armée, which generally followed the line of the Dvina River. After encountering stiff resistance from the 1st Detached Corps from the Russian First Western Army led by the soon to be well known Lieutenant General Peter Wittgenstein, both the II and VI (Bavarian) Corps under General de Division Laurent de Gouvion-Saint-Cyr fell back and took up a defensive position in and around Polotsk.

On 17 August, General Wittgenstein attacked the French in force, inflicting a sharp reverse on the II and VI Corps where Oudinot was wounded, and command was given to Marshal St Cyr, commanding VI Corps. The latter earned his Marshal's baton on the 18th when he counter-attacked and drove off the Russian Corps. During the engagement, the 1st, 2nd, and 3rd Swiss Regiments were initially not engaged, but the 18th St Cyr placed them in reserve as a precaution in case the action went against the French. St Cyr is said to have noted:

"I know the Swiss. I had a battalion of the 1st [Swiss] Regiment under my orders at Castlefranco in Italy. The French are more impetuous in an advance, but if it comes to a retreat, we can count on the calm and courage of the Swiss

— General de Division Laurent de Gouvion, Marquis de Gouvion-Saint-Cyr

In the afternoon, the 1st, 2nd, and 3rd Swiss Regiments were called upon to play a small but important role in the action when General Wittgenstein launched a bold cavalry charge to stabilise his deteriorating position. The Russian cavalry overran a French brigade but were brought up short of their full objective by several squares of Swiss. The Marquis de Gouvion-Saint-Cyr, who was riding in a carriage because of a wound he had suffered, was nearly captured when his transport was upset but was saved by the 3rd Swiss Regiment. The casualties overall of the Swiss, fortunately, were very light.

For the next two months, the Swiss led a relatively calm existence in and around Polotsk despite the enemy's relative proximity. The fact that all the Swiss regiments were serving together for the first time since they were formed meant that there were many occasions for socialising among relatives and old comrades-in-arms who had not seen each other for a long time. The men built sturdy huts for themselves and entrenchments and field fortifications wherever the rivers did not cover the town's approaches. Meanwhile, the officers hunted and fought duels. Daily life here, however, was far from perfect, because a lack of fresh food and clean water led to outbreaks of dysentery and other diseases that ravaged the strength of the Swiss regiments.

=== Second Battle of Polotsk ===
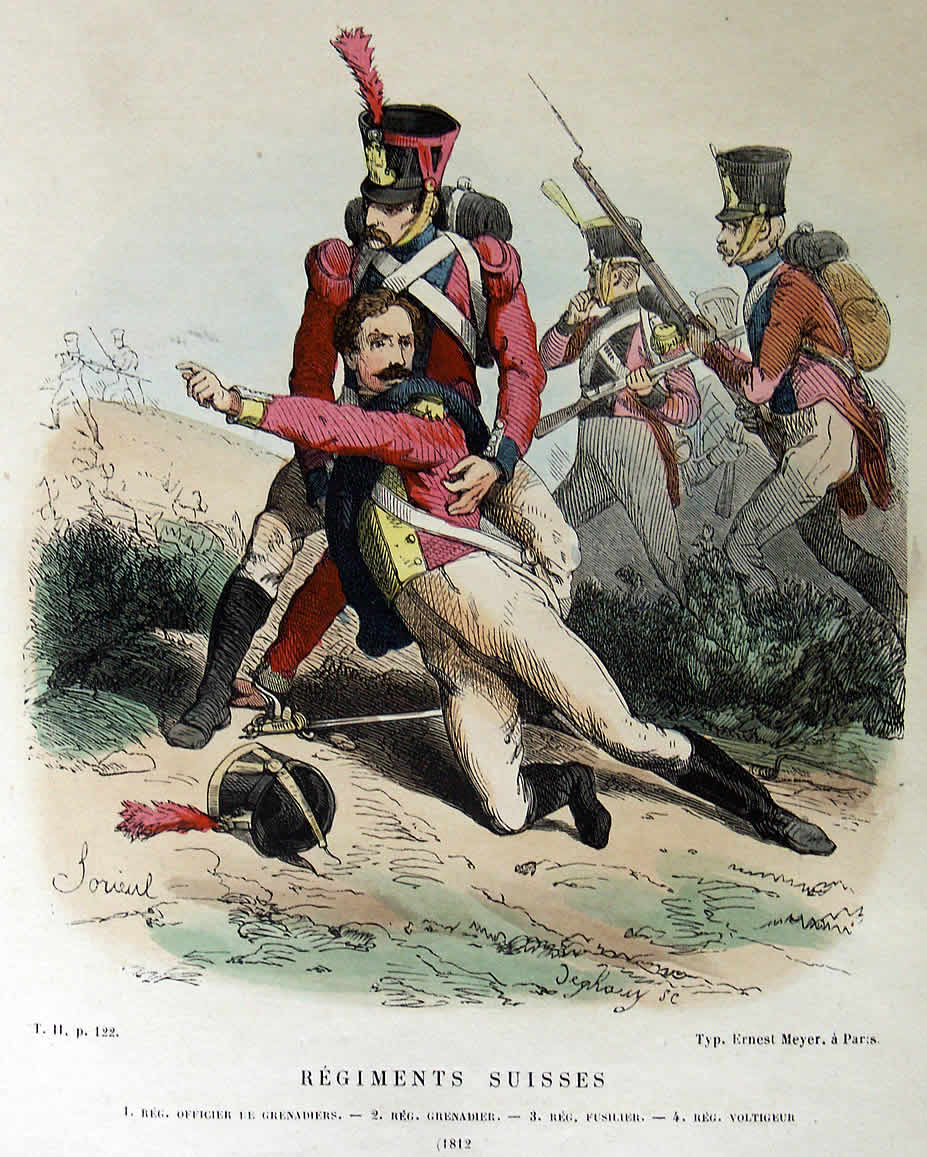
Uniforms of various Swiss regiments in French service. An officer of the 1st Swiss grenadiers can be seen being carried by a grenadier of the 2nd Swiss Regiment.

The Russians finally returned to the offensive on 17 October 1812, leading to the Second Battle of Polotsk. The Russians grouped once again under Lieutenant General Peter Wittgenstein in his 1st Detached Corps and grouped into three 'columns'. The First Column designated as the 'Right Hand Column' was commanded by Lieutenant General Prince Jaschwil, the Centre Column under Lieutenant General Gregor von Berg and the Left-Hand Column under Major General Begitschef. The French, meanwhile, were once again split between the II and VI (Bavarian) Corps, led by Marshals Oudinot and the Marquis de Saint Cyr de Gouvion.

The two forces were split between Wittgenstein's 40,000 men deploying a concentric attack against the positions held by less than 30,000 men under the Marquis of Saint Cyr. Simultaneously, another 12,000 Russians under General Stengel advanced along the Dvina's south bank in a flanking attack designed to cut off the French retreat. The 1st and 2nd Swiss of de Candrad's Brigade were part of the 9th Division under Divisional General Pierre Hugues Victoire Merle, though the 1st Swiss had only two battalions present while the 2nd-4th had three battalions each. The 9th Division was on the left of the French position though the 4th Swiss were in garrison in Polotsk itself and the 3rd Swiss was on the extreme right of the French some way down the road to Witebsk with some units of the 3rd Cuirassier Division and 3rd Light Horse Lancers. On that first day of fighting, the 1st Swiss had the most noteworthy role. The regiment had formed its elite grenadier and voltigeur companies in two separate 'elite battalions' and, on the 17th, the Grenadiers under Captain Jean Gilly and Jean Pierre Druey were posted in the chapel of Rostna and an adjoining walled cemetery that had been turned into a strong point. At 19:00 hours, the battalion was assailed by two Russian regiments. The Swiss fought until their ammunition was used up, then broke through the surrounding enemy forces in a desperate bayonet charge, leaving 150 dead behind while not abandoning a single wounded man. When the remaining Grenadiers were safely back within French lines, all of the regiment's officers gathered to assist in the midnight burial of the two Grenadier captains, who were killed in the battle.

The fighting became more widespread on the 18th. The Russians first assaulted the French right but were finally driven off in see-saw action that lasted more of the day. Then Wittgenstein launched a late attack on the French left. This gesture should have had little consequences, but the 1st and 2nd Swiss Regiments and 3rd Provisional Croats were then posted somewhat in advance of the French entrenchments. However, before they could be withdrawn from harm's way, they came under fire and responded with a few volleys of their own, followed by a bayonet charge that repulsed the enemy. The Eagle-Bearer of the 2nd Swiss was wounded, and he passed his burden to Captain Louis Bégos. The officer was then confronted by Captain Leonard Müller, one of the regiment's biggest men, who demanded the honour of defending the regimental standard. To Bégos' amazement, however, no sooner did Müller take the Eagle than he ran directly toward the enemy yelling "En avant le 2e!" ("Forward the 2nd"). All orders to disengage were ignored, and the Swiss swept forward after the captain.

It was magnificent, but also folly. The Swiss pushed forward unsupported in the face of Russian infantry and artillery fire, and the casualties were appalling. When it was impossible to advance further, they gave ground only grudgingly, withdrawing with parade-ground precision that inspired admiration in friend and foe alike. Wittgenstein attempted to administer a coup de grâce by launching his cavalry, including some elements of the Russian Combined Guards Cavalry Regiment, at the embattled redcoats, but they never lost their courage or composure as Colonel Raguettly of the 1st Swiss urged the men of both units to keep to their ranks, hold firm and not give up. The steadiness is demonstrated by the following passage from a memoir by an officer who participated in the action:

[T]he resistance stubborn: I mention the 1st Swiss Regiment, which deployed, began firing by platoons, advanced, stopped and began firing again, this time by files. Ceasing fire, the unit performed an about-face and retreated at a normal pace, then stopped, faced around and began firing again.

— Memoir of Rosselet

By the time the Swiss returned to French lines, the two regiments had suffered casualties of over 60 officers and 1,100 men. As an example to illustrate the carnage, at the end of the day, one company was commanded by a sergeant major named Bornand who had been wounded three times (a sabre-cut to the head, a musket ball in the arm and a wound in the leg) and mustered only three privates and a single corporal. Colonel Castella of the 2nd Swiss Regiment reported that 33 of the 50 officers of his unit present with the colours at the start of the day were killed or wounded.

The Swiss preserved their standards as well as their honour. Captain Müller was shot dead shortly after starting his charge, leaving the eagle of the 2nd at the mercy of the Russians. Captain Bégos rushed forward to save it but found that the flag was pinned underneath Müller's corpse, which he was at first unable to budge because of Müller's great weight. Bégos got down on his knees and, undoubtedly with the help of some adrenaline, was finally able to pull the colours clear. He gave the eagle and the colours to an NCO to carry to safety, then retook his place at the head of his troops. Lieutenant Legler and Sergeant Kaa preserved the eagle of the 1st Swiss, but no details exist of this feat.

On 19 October, the very day that Napoleon began retreating from Moscow, the battered Russians rested for the most part, waiting for their flanking movement to develop and provide more decisive results than they had been able to achieve on the battlefield. The Marquis de Saint Cyr realised what was happening and also realised that he had to withdraw to avoid encirclement. The French retirement through the town of Polotsk and across the bridges over the Dvina was favoured by a thick fog and was handled so discreetly that the Russians at first failed to notice what was happening. Unfortunately, some of the retreating soldiers set fire to their abandoned barracks in the early evening, and the flames brought on an immediate Russian assault. The 3rd and 4th Swiss Regiments were among the troops ordered to hold the town at all costs until the rest of the army had escaped.

The fight for Polotsk was one of the campaign's most savage battles, conducted at night in a town full of blazing wooden buildings. Once the outer perimeters were breached, the fighting became hand-to-hand in the streets and houses, but the Swiss maintained their discipline and organisation throughout.

=== Retreat from Russia ===
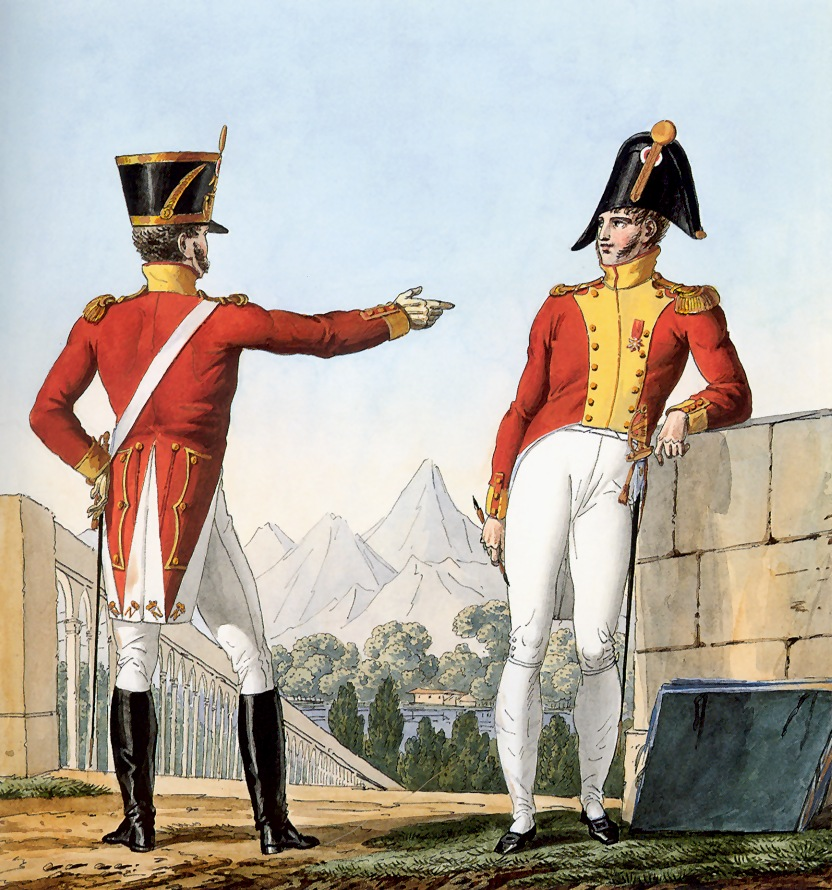
Two captains of the 1st Swiss Regiment in two variations of uniform. The left uniform is 'Full Dress', that which is used during inspections and battles. The right uniform is 'Small Dress' used for daily use.

The performance of the Swiss at the Second Battle of Polotsk was one of the finest by foreign troops during the whole of the Napoleonic Wars. Marshal Sainte Cyr recognised in his report that he owed the escape of his baggage and all of his guns to the Swiss, although he did chide them for the 'excessive' courage that had led to such fearful losses on the 18th. Napoleon himself mentioned the stalwart performance of the Swiss in the 28th Bulletin published on 1 November, and the four regiments were awarded thirty-four Legion of Honour decorations.

After Polotsk, the Swiss and the II Corps' other remaining units retired slowly towards the French main body returning from Moscow. Although reduced in numbers, the Swiss were in relatively good condition since many had warm overcoats and new shoes they had found in Polotsk. They were stunned when they finally met up with the ragged remains of the Grande Armée on the banks of the Berezina accompanied by a tired-looking Napoleon wearing his traditional grey overcoat.

==== Berezina Crossing ====
The Emperor subjected the Swiss to an impromptu review on 27 November, then dispatched them across the improvised bridges with the mission of protecting the French line of retreat from the forces of General Pavel Chichagov's 3rd Western Army. After a restless night spent in a forest, they awoke to the unexpected sound of a traditional Swiss patriotic hymn sung by Lieutenant David Legler and a choir of officers and men. This song of voyage and homecoming, known as the "Song of the Beresina"

The thin line of battle that was formed that morning of 28 November to face the Russian onslaught consisted of the four Swiss regiments, the Legion of the Vistula, the 123rd Line Infantry Regiment (formed from disbanded regiments of the Kingdom of Holland), and the 3rd Provisional Croatian Regiment, plus General of Division Jean-Pierre Doumerc's heavy cavalry division, all under the command of Marshals Michel Ney and Nicolas Oudinot. The understrength units mustered perhaps 7,000 men and were heavily outnumbered by the enemy.

The battle would last the whole day. Attacked by eight full regiments of infantry, the Swiss fired off all their ammunition and then, under direct orders from General Merle, advanced with the cold steel to drive the enemy back. Having won some breathing room, they retired, found more ammunition, then repeated the same sequence – something they were to do a remarkable total of eight times during the day. The men who were not wounded were exhausted and had no opportunity to eat, but they fought on, never offering a complaint and mustering the same vigour for their bayonet attacks throughout the day. By the end, all the drummers had been killed or wounded, and Captain Rey had to pick up an abandoned drum to beat the charge himself.

The astonishing effort of the Swiss alone might not have been enough to win the day for the French, but it was matched by those of the other foreign troops in action and surpassed by that of Domerc's cavalry division. The 400 men of the 4th, 7th, and 14th Cuirassiers, representing almost the last organised cavalry in the whole of the Grande Armée, routed an entire Russian division and forced over 2,000 Russians to surrender. As soldiers on both sides collapsed from exhaustion at 22:00 hours, the French knew that they had held their position and had prevented the Russians from trapping the Emperor and the last remnants of his army.

The cost for the Swiss in human lives was severe, particularly regarding the many officers who were still mounted and therefore made easy targets. Chef de Bataillon Blattman was knocked from his horse and was killed by a bullet in the forehead. No exact count of casualties was possible in the circumstances, but the Swiss were virtually wiped out as a fighting force, although each of the four regiments had preserved their Eagles. Counting stragglers and detachments, there were perhaps just 300 men left in the division.

General Merle told Napoleon that he thought that every Swiss soldier deserved to be decorated for the Battle of Berezina, and he persuaded the Emperor to award the Swiss sixty-two crosses of the Legion of Honour. Unfortunately, the order to that effect was lost, and so the deserving officer and men of the Swiss regiments never received any officer recompense for their valour. However, their performance was accorded proper recognition by their countrymen, who viewed them as heroes whose actions were a source of national pride.

== War of the Sixth Coalition ==
=== Reorganisation ===
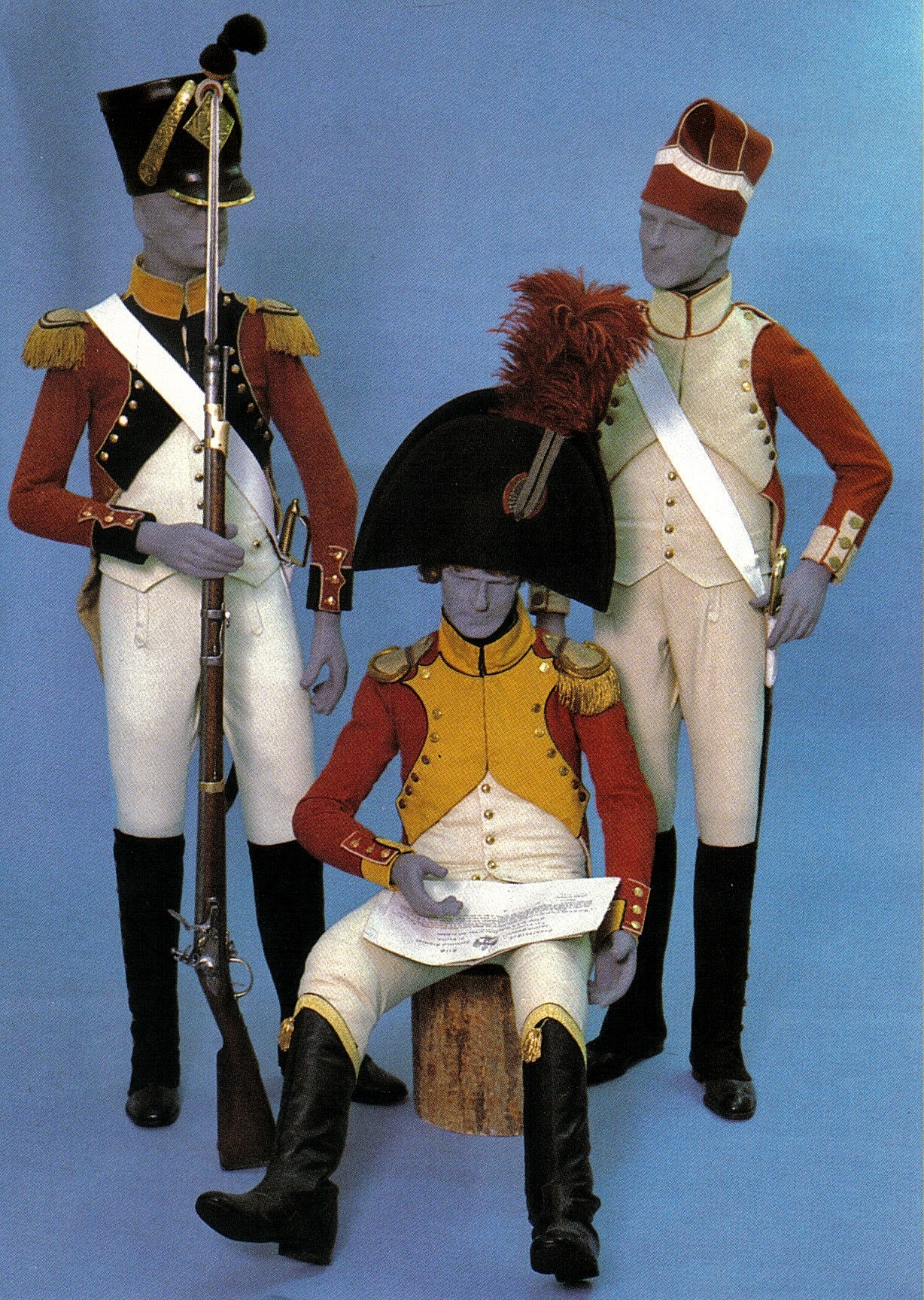
Variations of Swiss regimental uniforms, the figure standing on the left is a member of the 3rd regiment, the officer sitting is from the 1st Swiss regiment, and the figure standing on the right is a member of the Valasian Battalion.

The Swiss regiments suffered such stupendous casualties during the Russian campaign that they had to be completely reorganised for the 1813 campaign. After assembling the soldiers in the regimental depots, survivors of the Russian campaign, new recruits, recovering wounded, soldiers returning from Spain and other odds and ends, each of the four Swiss regiments fielded a single battalion for active service (formerly using three battalions). There were also small detachments of Swiss serving in several fortresses (including, most notably, Custrin) held by French garrisons when their main force retreated from the Duchy of Warsaw and East Prussia.

=== German campaign ===
According to official returns, by 1813, the 1st Swiss was the weakest of the four regiments, standing at 587 in strength, with 210 Russian campaign veterans. By Spring 1813, all four of the Swiss regiments were assigned to General Gabriel Jean Joseph Molitor's independent Corps of Observation of Holland charged with defending the Dutch departments of the French Empire. By October however, the 1st–3rd Swiss regiments advanced into Germany to take up a position at the famed battlefield of Minden in the Kingdom of Westphalia.

On 10 October, the 1st Swiss along with fifty recruits of the 4th Swiss Regiment joined the Bremen garrison. The town had 30,000 inhabitants, which were of dubious loyalty to the Emperor. The forces' arrival was quite timely for the French commandant, Colonel Thuillier, as on 13 October, the town was assaulted by a mixed force of 4–5,000 Russian Cossacks and Prussian Freikorps under General Tettenborn. The voltigeur company under Captain Segesser was assigned to dispute the possession of the town's eastern suburb, and a French official who observed the combat noted that the Swiss "shot with such marvellous accuracy that any enemy soldier who showed himself was soon dead or wounded". The enemy retired. However, the Swiss made the mistake of pursuing them into open country. When a group of Cossacks appeared, a supporting French cavalry unit fled, leaving the voltigeurs surrounded. The Swiss chose to fight rather than surrender, but it was not a fair contest and 86 out of the 97 men were killed, captured, or wounded. Captain Segesser himself, badly wounded, is said to have fired two last pistol shots before he died and killed two cossacks.

The next day saw more fighting and more Swiss casualties, but resistance faltered when Colonel Thuillier was killed, and Major Dufresne wounded. The new commander negotiated an honourable capitulation on 15 October, which allowed the garrison to leave with the honours of war but bound them not to fight against the allies anywhere north of the Rhine. Recruiters of the Russian–German Legion attempted to persuade the Swiss to desert and enlist in the said unit. However, the Swiss proudly disdained these advances with indignation. By a decree of 22 December 1813, four Swiss officers and two other ranks received the Legion of Honour for their part in the town's defence.

=== Defence of France ===
All the Swiss regiment fell back towards or into French territory after the Battle of Leipzig, and the different regiments experienced different fates. After its defeat at Bremen, the 1st Swiss were pulled back to the banks of the Rhine and were incorporated into the Maestricht Garrison. It would remain here until the end of the war, ravaged by typhus rather than warfare. However, a small detachment of the regiment was based and later besieged in Metz where it suffered a small mutiny when some men refused to work on the fortifications until they received all the pay due to them. The instigator of the trouble was quickly tried and shot.

The Swiss government had tried to recall the Swiss regiments at the end of December 1813 by invoking a clause in the convention with Napoleon that permitted such an action if the Swiss homeland was invaded, but circumstances prevented that initiative from having any practical outcome.

With Napoleon's First Abdication and subsequent Treaty of Fontainbleau, the hated Bourbons were restored to the throne of France. However, the Bourbons wanted to keep the convention in effect. So, under the First Restoration, the status of the Swiss regiments remained unchanged. However, life was hardly normal as released prisoners received the wounded, and missing detachments returned to their depots from all over Europe.

== Disbandment ==
When Napoleon returned from Elba, the Swiss regiments found themselves in a serious dilemma. Their home government now bound them to serve the Bourbons, and the Swiss authorities refused to switch the benefit of the contract back to Napoleon. When Napoleon called upon the Swiss to defy their own government and serve again with him, most of them took the path of patriotism (and, possibly, disgusted with war) and returned home.

However, some Swiss did decide to join Napoleon. They were formed into a regiment under the command of Colonel Christopher Stoeffel, who had been a captain in the 3rd Swiss in 1807 but had served exclusively in staff posts thereafter. A single battalion was formed in that regiment and served in General Vandamme's III Corps during the Waterloo Campaign, notably at the Battle of Wavre where it was wiped out. This regiment used the uniform and eagles of the 1st Swiss.

== Bourbon Restoration ==
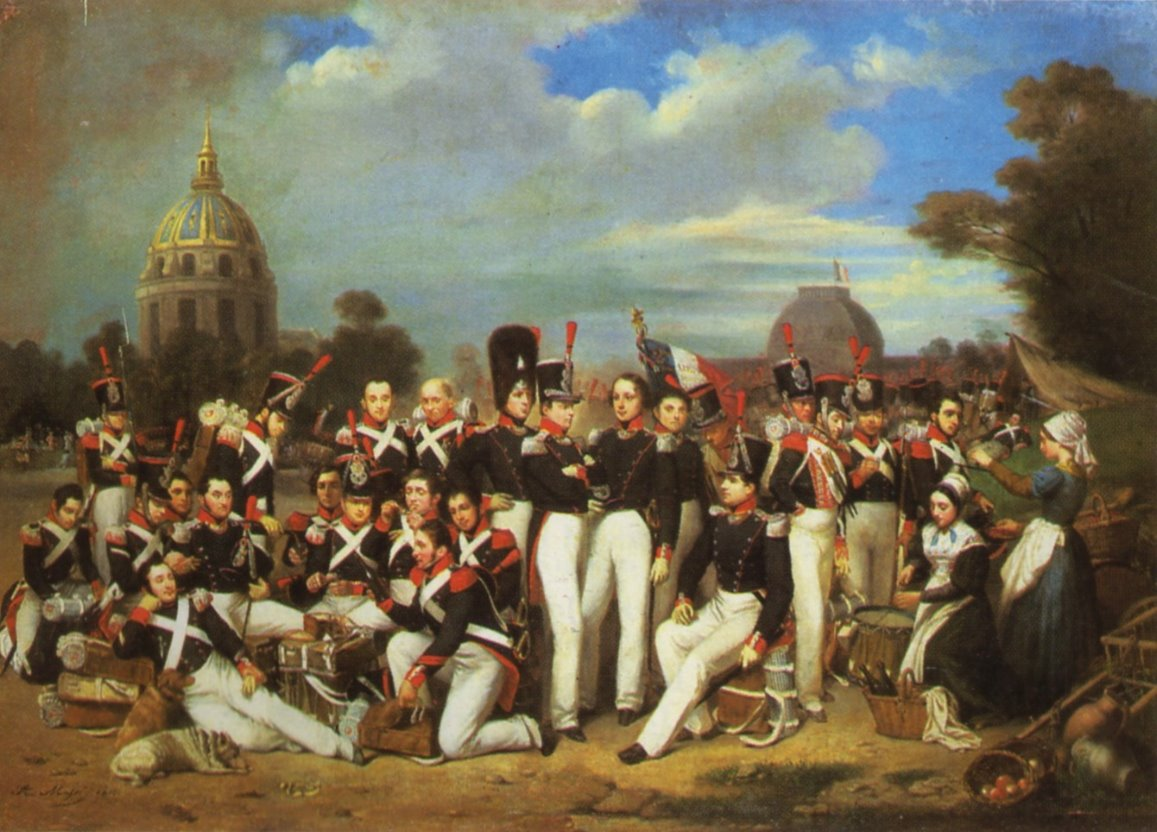
A company of men from the 2nd Foreign Legion at the Champ de Mars in Paris shortly after their formation, in 1836.

Under the complete reorganisation of the French Army in 1815–16, the old regiments were disbanded and reformed into new 'departmental legions' (Légions des Departments). However, in keeping with tradition, the 1st and 2nd Swiss were consequently reformed. The regiment was now uniformed as follows: red coat with blue lapels, red collar, blue cuffs, red cuff patches, white skirt turnbacks, and red piping. The fusiliers wore the shako, while the grenadiers worse a bearskin fur cap, and the voltigeurs had a shako with a yellow plume.

Following the 1830 July Revolution, all Swiss regiments (including those in the Guard) were mustered out and subsequently disbanded. However, the majority of the troops from both of the beforementioned units were kept in the army, with the 1st Swiss helping to form the later famed Foreign Legion. It was, in fact, Colonel Stoffel, the former commander of the 2nd Foreign Regiment (Swiss) during the Hundred Days who helped form the legion. These soldiers would later help form the 2nd Foreign Legion in 1835, which later became the 2nd Foreign Infantry Regiment which remains in French service as a mechanised infantry regiment.

== Uniform ==
The 1st Swiss was formed from the 3rd Swiss Demi-Brigade and seemed to have retained the uniforms of the latter unit, which were red coats with yellow lapels, cuffs (with red cuff flaps) and turnbacks, sky blue trim around the collar, the cuff flaps and the yellow facings and white turnbacks. Forthofer's uniform plates include an illustration of a plain red, single-breasted jacket with long tails and red turnbacks ornamented with gold grenades on a sky blue cloth background. During the period of 1809–12, the hat was a black shako with white cords, yellow shoulder straps, yellow collar and white piping all around.

The uniform was further modified in style and detail by the 1812 dress regulations. The jackets now had yellow collars and closed yellow lapels, both with red piping, while white piping was prescribed for the cuff flaps. The fusiliers were assigned red shoulder straps piped yellow, while the grenadiers were now supposed to have red epaulettes. Apparently, the grenadiers maintained their bearskin caps, with a copper plate adorned with a grenade.

The regiment had a full regimental band which participated in the Russian campaign. In 1805, the uniform jacket of the regimental drummers appeared to have been adapted from that for the 3rd Swiss Demi-Brigade – blue with yellow collar, cuffs, cuff flaps, and lapels, all trimmed with gold-laced and piped with sky blue. The drummers also wore red 'swallow's-nest' ornaments, trimmed yellow, on their shoulders.

== Regimental Eagles ==
Each of the Swiss regiments received an Eagle and Model 1804 standard of the same type used by French line troops when it was formed. However, it appears the Swiss were never issued model 1812 eagles. The Swiss demi-brigades that were used to create the 1st Swiss possessed their own eagles and colours, but they were replaced when the new regiment was formed. The 1st Swiss recruited one eagle and one standard for each battalion, which were distributed during the course of the first trimester of 1806. A wing was broken off the eagle in action at the First Battle of Polotsk, and Sergeant Kaa had to save it from being captured at the 2nd Battle of the name. It was preserved during the retreat from Russia by Lieutenant Legler and is mentioned as having been in Maastricht in January 1814. Some officers preserved both the colour and the eagle in safekeeping after Napoleon's abdication, and they were used briefly by the 2nd Foreign Regiment in 1815.

== Commanding Officers ==
Throughout the regiment's history, only two colonels led the unit:

- 18 July 1805 – 9 December 1812, Colonel André Ragetti – former CO of the 3rd Swiss Demi-Brigade, died after being captured by Russians following the Siege of Vilna
- December 1812–4 May 1814, Colonel Rodolphe Louis Emmanuel, Réal de Chapelle – former Colonel-en-Second of the regiment since 1805

Note: under the First Restoration, Charles, Count of Artois (Comte d'Artois) was appointed as Colonel–General of Swiss Troops, making him the de facto regimental chef; however, the above list only includes those officers who led during the Napoleonic Era pre-restoration.
