= Toruń Fortress =

- Twierdza Toruń (Polish)
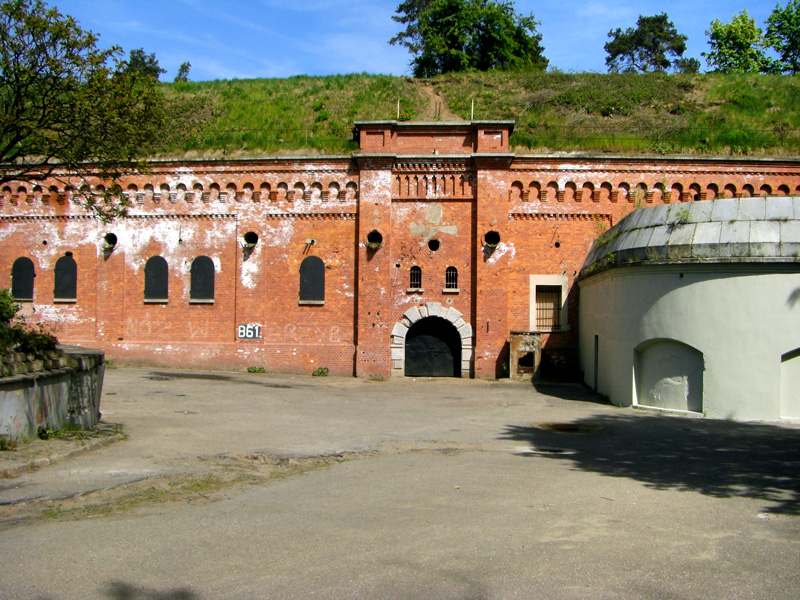
- Fort I of the Toruń Fortress
- Interactive map of the Toruń Fortress area

General information
- Type: fortification
- Location: Toruń, Poland
- Construction started: 1872
- Completed: 1894

Toruń Fortress (Polish: Twierdza Toruń, German: Festung Thorn) is a historic fortress located in Toruń, Poland, one of the largest fortresses in Central and Eastern Europe.

It was built in 1872–1894 by the Kingdom of Prussia, when the city was part of the Prussian Partition of Poland. The fortress complex – a chain of forts surrounding the city, as well as numerous smaller fortifications supplementing it – was intended to defend the eastern border of Prussia (with the Russian Empire). Despite much planning and investment, the fortress did not play a significant role in the First World War nor in any later conflict. During the German occupation of Poland in the Second World War, Germany established and operated a prison for Poles and the Stalag XX-A prisoner-of-war camp for Polish, British, French, Australian and Soviet POWs in the fortress. It was the site of German massacres of Poles committed as part of the Intelligenzaktion.

== History ==
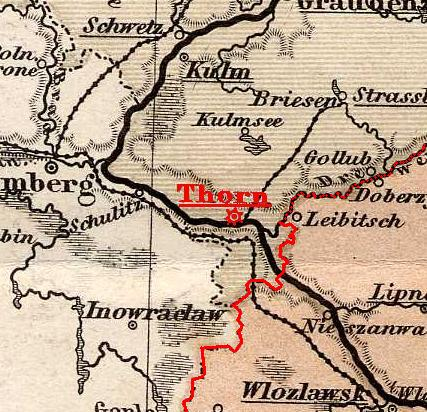
Toruń (marked in red as Thorn) near the 19th-century German/Prussian and Russian border in partitioned Poland (also marked in red).

Toruń was an important city, which following the Partitions of Poland was located just north and west of the border between Prussia and Russia, which runs from southwest to northeast, in the north along the Drwęca tributary of the Vistula River which passes through Thorn. With improvements in artillery techniques, including the introduction of rifled barrels and smokeless powder), the old medieval city walls, dating from the 13th-15th centuries, and bastion fortifications from the 17th century, even if modernized at the beginning of the 19th century, no longer provided sufficient protection for the town.

The Prussian government started the construction of fortifications in 1872, at first using French prisoners of war taken during the Franco-Prussian War. The goal was to build a chain of forts surrounding the city of Toruń. The initial plans called for five main forts and two medium ones to be constructed. In the period of 1877–1884, forts II and XI were constructed, followed by forts IV, V, VII, XV, XIII and IX. Continuing changes in artillery and siege techniques, especially the introduction of an anti-building shell in 1883, rendered some of the plans for the fortress obsolete even before it was finished. For that reason, the importance of the main artillery forts was lessened in favor of infantry forts; some artillery forts were redesigned into infantry forts and more small fortifications were constructed. Over time the number of objects to be built increased. In the years 1888–1893, forts III, VI, VIII, X, XII and XIV were added. The last to be constructed was fort I, which was the most technically advanced one. Within 32 years, about 200 fortifications were constructed. Primarily the fortress consisted of seven main forts, six medium-sized ones, six artillery batteries, 32 infantry shelters, and 52 mid-field shelters (used for artillery and ammunition sheltering).

The Toruń Fortress complex would be constantly modernised by the Prussian government, for the last time in 1914 – just before the start of the First World War. The majority of the forts were equipped with wing artillery batteries – armor artillery batteries between forts XI, XII, XII and XII, XIII, XIV, and an experimental artillery battery in fort XI. New observation points for infantry and artillery were also added. Exits from them were designed in a labyrinthine scheme, to reduce the effects of the explosions' blast waves.

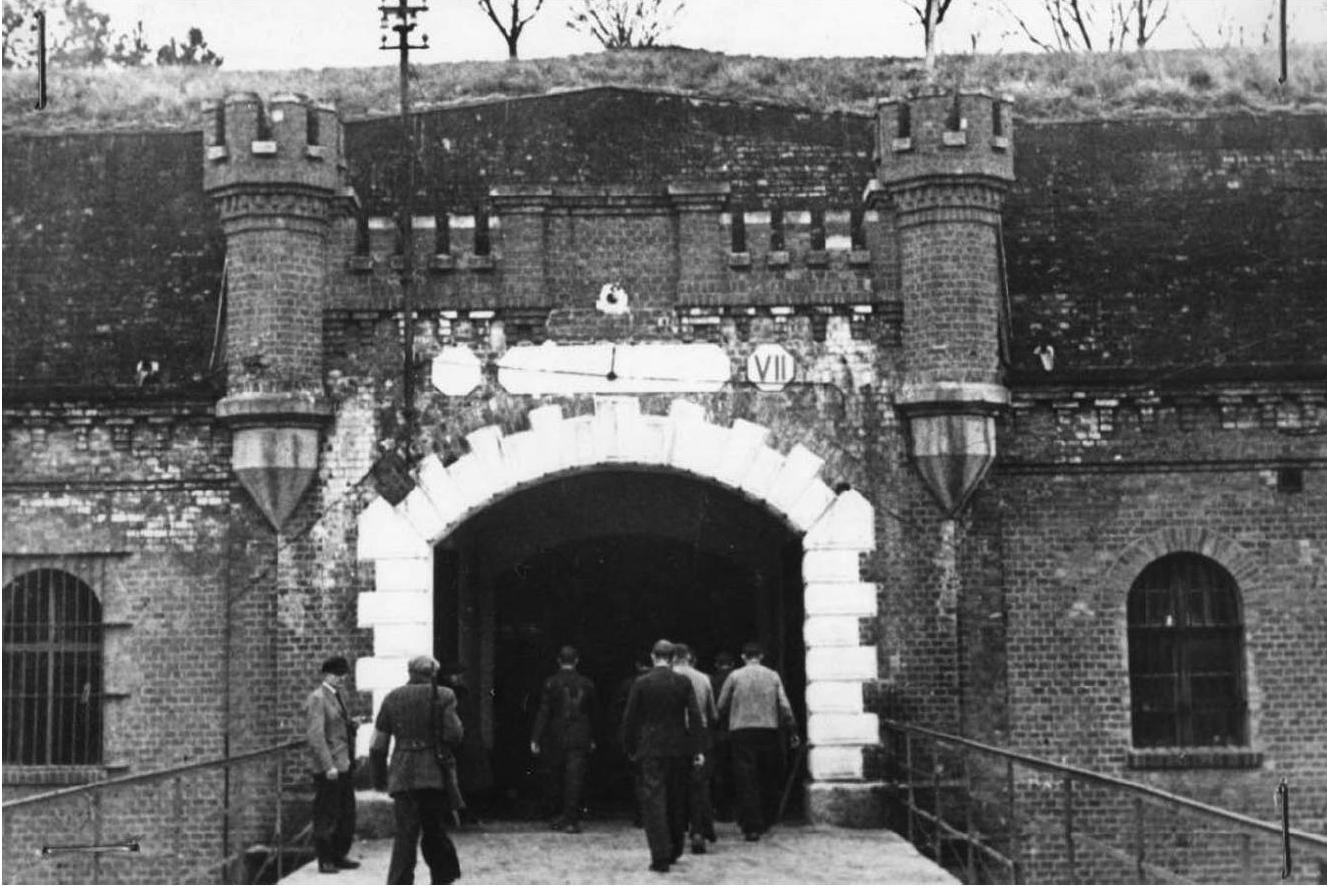
Arrested Poles and German guards at the gate of Fort VII during the German occupation of Poland in 1939

The fortress was commissioned by the Prussian government; it would cost over 60 million German gold marks until 1914. About 30% of Toruń's infrastructure was related to the fortress, and about 25% of the city's population were employed by the fortress. Despite that investment, it was never besieged by Russian forces and took no significant part in the First World War. After the war it became a part of the Second Polish Republic.

During the German occupation of Poland (Second World War), from October 1939, Fort VII housed a German police prison for Poles arrested in the city and county in the Intelligenzaktion. In the overcrowded prison, the Germans interrogated the Poles, who were then either deported to concentration camps or murdered in large massacres carried out in nearby forests. Among the victims were local activists, teachers, priests, and farmers. In the spring of 1942, the Germans murdered 30 Polish boy scouts aged 13–16 in Fort VII. In the seven southern forts (XI-XVII), the German administration operated the Stalag XX-A prisoner-of-war camp for Polish, British, French, Australian and Soviet POWs.

In 1971 the fortress was officially declared a monument by the Polish government.

== The complex ==
The Thorn Fortress complex is currently composed of 15 forts (seven artillery and eight infantry) as well as many smaller fortifications.

Fort
Name German (until 1920) Polish (afterwards)	Built	Description	Picture
Fort Ia "König Wilhelm I" Fort I "Jan III Sobieski"	1888–1892	The most modern fort in the complex was the first armored fort of the German Empire; as a prototype of the armored forts it served as the basis for many similar fortifications later built on the western border of the German Empire (for example in Metz). Despite its numeral I in both German and Polish descriptions, it was built as the last fort of the fortress, in the years 1888–1892. The fort was the location of the heaviest artillery in the fortress complex, with four 210 mm calibre howitzers placed in the armored towers. In addition to the artillery, the fort had two armored observation points for artillery and two infantry observation towers.	
Fort I (Buchrafort) "Bülow" Fort II "Stefan Czarniecki"	1878–1882	This was constructed as a model main artillery fort. It is the oldest main fort of Prussian design. As a part of modernisation, it was equipped with an observation point for artillery (Wz.87 - PBSt. 87).	53.0189°N 18.6679°E
Fort I-5 "Werk L'Estocq" Fort III "Stanisław Jabłonowski"	1888–1890	Fort III: Also known as "Long Battery" Fort. With an embankment and a moat, it shelters 18 artillery pieces.	
Fort II "Yorck" Fort IV "Stanisław Żółkiewski"	1878–1884	Planned as a main artillery fort, it was rebuilt for the infantry. It was modernized with the addition of an observation point for artillery (Wz.87 - PBSt. 87). It is the only fort fully adapted to tourist visits. It is the site of a youth hostel for 100 people and a restaurant.	Main gate of Fort IV 53.0238°N 18.656°E
Fort III "Scharnhorst" Fort V "Jan Karol Chodkiewicz"	1878–1884	Planned as a main artillery fort, it was rebuilt for the infantry (just as Fort IV). As a part of modernisation it was equipped with a modern observation point for artillery (Wz.87 - PBSt. 87). Before World War I, its roof was reinforced with a corrugated sheet.	53.0337°N 18.6463°E
Fort IIIa "Dohna" Fort VI "Jarema Wiśniowiecki"	1889–1893	Designed as a typical, trapezium-shaped infantry fort. Currently located in the militarized area.	
Fort IV "Friedrich der Grosse" Fort VII "Tadeusz Kościuszko"	1879–1883	Planned as a main artillery fort, it was rebuilt for the infantry (just as forts IV and V). In the vicinity there is a green tourist route. Site of execution of over 1,500 Polish citizens by the Gestapo during the Second World War in the years 1939–1940.	53.0409°N 18.6329°E
Fort IVb "Herzog Albrecht" Fort VIII "Kazimierz Wielki" (Casimir the Great)	1889–1893	Designed as a typical, trapezium-shaped infantry fort. It was equipped with three observation towers for infantry and wing batteries	
Fort IVa "Heinrich von Plauen" Fort IX "Bolesław Chrobry"	1882–1885	A medium-sized fort, rebuilt for infantry, but unfinished as its design was rendered obsolete with the coming of the demolition ammunition.	
Batterie Grünthalmühte Fort X "Bateria Nadbrzeżna" (Riverside Battery)	1889–1892	This open artillery battery with six 120 mm artillery pieces had the aim on the Vistula River. It was the only fort with no infantry observation towers.	Ruins of Fort X
Fort V "Grosser Kurfürst" Fort XI "Stefan Batory"	1877–1881	Built as a model artillery fort. One of the buildings of Stalag XX-A. Currently owned by Polmozbyl company and used as a warehouse.	53.0431°N 18.6050°E
Fort Va "Ulrich von Jungingen" Fort XII "Władysław Jagiełło"	1889–1893	Designed as a typical, trapezium-shaped fort for infantry. In 1941, it was part of Stalag XX-C. It is located in a military training field.	Ruins of caponier of Fort XII ("Władysław Jagiełło")
Fort VI "Winrich von Kniprode" Fort XIII "Karol Kniaziewicz"	1880–1885	The main artillery fort, unfinished as its design was rendered obsolete with the coming of the demolition ammunition. A military structure. Site of one of the Camps for Russian prisoners and internees in Poland in 1919–1924. Headquarters of the Polish Army Pomorze during the German invasion of Poland. Internment camp for Polish soldiers, later part of Stalag XX-A.	53.0389°N 18.5857°E
Fort VIa "Hermann Balk" Fort XIV "Józef Bem"	1889–1893	This medium-sized infantry fort was envisioned as an irregular trapezium, with front and left side protected by a moat. Later it served as the hospital of Stalag XX-A.	Ruins of Fort XIV
Fort VII "Hermann von Salza" Fort XV "Henryk Dąbrowski"	1881–1885	Designed as an artillery fort and refitted for an infantry stronghold, it was later equipped with an artillery observation point. (Wz.87 - PBSt. 87). Used as camp for Russian soldiers, later part of Stalag XX-A, and after the war, briefly, a camp for German prisoners.	53.0348°N 18.5645°E
Fort VIII Fort XVI	(?) 1889–1893	Part of the Stalag XX-A POW camp during the German occupation of Poland.	53.0231°N 18.5569°E
Fort IX Fort XVII	(?) 1889–1893	Part of the Stalag XX-A POW camp during the German occupation of Poland.	53.0155°N 18.5587°E
