= Sigismond Frédéric de Berckheim =

French General

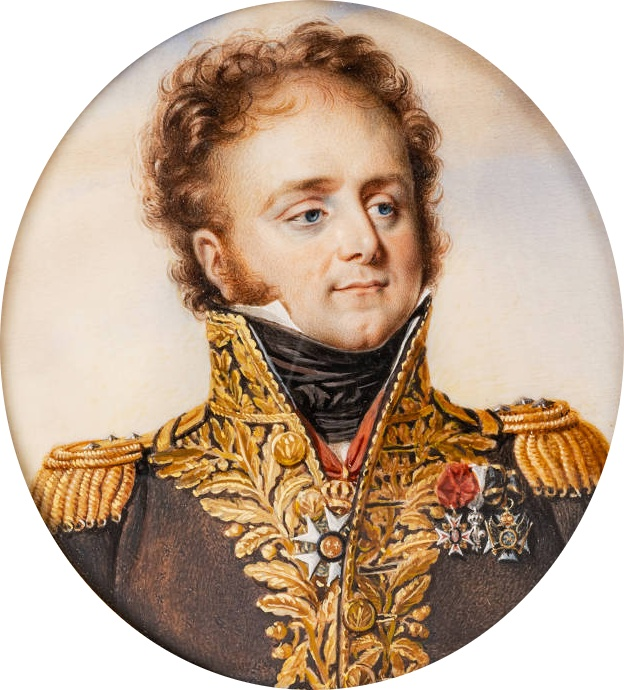
- Portrait miniature of Sigismond Frédéric de Berckheim, by Jean-Urbain Guérin, circa 1815
- Born: 9 May 1775; Ribeauvillé, France
- Died: 28 December 1817 (aged 42) Paris, France
- Allegiance: France
- Branch: Infantry, Cavalry
- Service years: (Kingdom of France) 1786–1791, 1814–1819 (France) 1791–1814
- Rank: General of Division
- Conflicts: War of the Fourth Coalition; War of the Fifth Coalition; Battle of Eckmühl; Battle of Ratisbon; Battle of Aspern-Essling; Battle of Wagram; French invasion of Russia; First Battle of Polotsk; Second Battle of Polotsk; Battle of Berezina; War of the Sixth Coalition; Battle of Lützen; Battle of Bautzen; Battle of Dresden; Battle of Leipzig; Battle of Hanau; Battle of Arcis-sur-Aube
- Awards: Légion d'Honneur, CC 1813
- Other work: Baron of the Empire, 1810; Order of Saint Louis, 1814; Chamber of Deputies, 1815–1816

Sigismond Frédéric de Berckheim (9 May 1775 – 28 December 1817) became a French division commander during the last years of the Napoleonic Wars. Born into an old Alsatian family, he joined an infantry regiment at the age of 14. In 1807 he became the commanding officer of the 1st Cuirassier Regiment. In 1809 he led his cavalrymen at Eckmühl, Ratisbon, Aspern-Essling and Wagram. Promoted to general of brigade, he fought at First and Second Polotsk and the Berezina in 1812. He led a cavalry brigade at Lützen and Bautzen in 1813. Promoted to general of division, he led a cavalry division at Dresden, Leipzig and Hanau. He commanded a cavalry division at Arcis-sur-Aube in 1814. He became an inspector general and a member of the Chamber of Deputies in 1815 and 1816. His surname is one of the names inscribed under the Arc de Triomphe, on Column 12.

== Early career ==
Berckheim was born on 9 May 1775 in Ribeauvillé in the French province of Alsace. The village later became part of the Haut-Rhin department. The Berckheims were an old Alsatian aristocratic family. His father was Philipp Friedrich de Berckheim (1732–1812), a captain in the Regiment of Alsace and deputy in the 1787 assembly of Alsace. In 1766 his father married his mother, Marie-Octavie-Louise de Glaubitz. Sigismond was the third of seven children and the first born son. His siblings were Caroline-Octavie-Louise (1771–1842), Louise-Henriette-Sophie (b. 1772), Louise-Amélie (1776–1855), Frédérique-Françoise (b. 1778), Chrétien-Frédéric (1781–1832) and Philippe-Gustave (1783–1812).

At the age of 14, in about 1789, Berckheim entered the Infantry Regiment of Lamarck as a sous-lieutenant and progressed through the grades in rank. Though there are records of his Légion d'Honneur awards, the French archive for Berckheim is missing the important document Etat de Services et Campagnes (Statement of Service and Campaigns). The regiments and campaigns in which he served between 1789 and 1805 are unknown. For example, the records for his younger brother Chrétien-Frédéric exist. These show that Chrétien joined the French military service as a guide for Jean Victor Marie Moreau on 22 March 1800 and was promoted to chef d'escadron (major) on 4 November 1813.

== Empire ==
=== 1805–1811 ===
Berckheim became a member of the Légion d'Honneur on 6 August 1805. He was appointed colonel of the 1st Cuirassier Regiment on 1 April 1807. As part of the 2nd Cuirassier Division, the 1st Cuirassiers were involved in a skirmish at Königsberg on 14 June 1807, the same day as the Battle of Friedland, which the regiment missed. According to one source, Berckheim fought at both Friedland and the Battle of Heilsberg. However, the battle honors of the 1st Cuirassiers do not include either action.

At the beginning of the War of the Fifth Coalition, the 1st Cuirassiers (793-strong) formed part of the 2nd Heavy Cavalry Division of Raymond-Gaspard de Bonardi de Saint-Sulpice. At first, the division was attached to III Corps, but Emperor Napoleon soon assigned it to a provisional corps led by Marshal Jean Lannes along with another heavy cavalry division under Étienne Marie Antoine Champion de Nansouty, a cavalry brigade led by Charles Claude Jacquinot and two infantry divisions borrowed from III Corps. At the Battle of Abensberg on 20 April 1809, Lannes' corps and the Bavarian VII Corps smashed the Austrian left flank, killing and wounding 2,700 enemies and capturing 4,000 more. However, one brigade from Saint-Sulpice's division was assigned to guard the defile at Saal an der Donau. The battle honors of the 1st Cuirassiers do not include Abensberg, but they do include the next four major actions in 1809.

At the Battle of Eckmühl on the afternoon of 22 April 1809, the key to the Austrian position was the Bettelberg, a hill topped by a 16-gun battery of artillery and defended by the Austrian IV Corps under Franz Seraph of Orsini-Rosenberg. Some Bavarian cavalry tried to overrun the hill but were driven off. Next, Saint-Sulpice's four cuirassier regiments, two Württemberg cavalry regiments and the rallied Bavarians charged the Bettelberg again. Despite counterattacks by Austrian horsemen and blasts of canister shot from the guns, the Allies seized the hill, capturing most of the cannons. Rosenberg immediately ordered his beaten corps to retreat. At 7:00 pm that evening there was a cavalry melee that involved perhaps 15,000 horsemen. On the Allied side were Nansouty's 24 squadrons of cuirassiers and six squadrons of Württemberg cavalry in the first line. In the second line were Saint-Sulpice's 16 squadrons and in reserve there were 10 to 14 Bavarian squadrons. They were opposed by 32 squadrons of Austrian cavalry. The more numerous Allied cavalry routed the Austrians. As Saint-Sulpice's division led the pursuit, it encountered two battalions of Austrian grenadiers formed in squares and completely smashed them. At 9:00 pm the pursuit ended due to the exhaustion of the Allied cavalry.

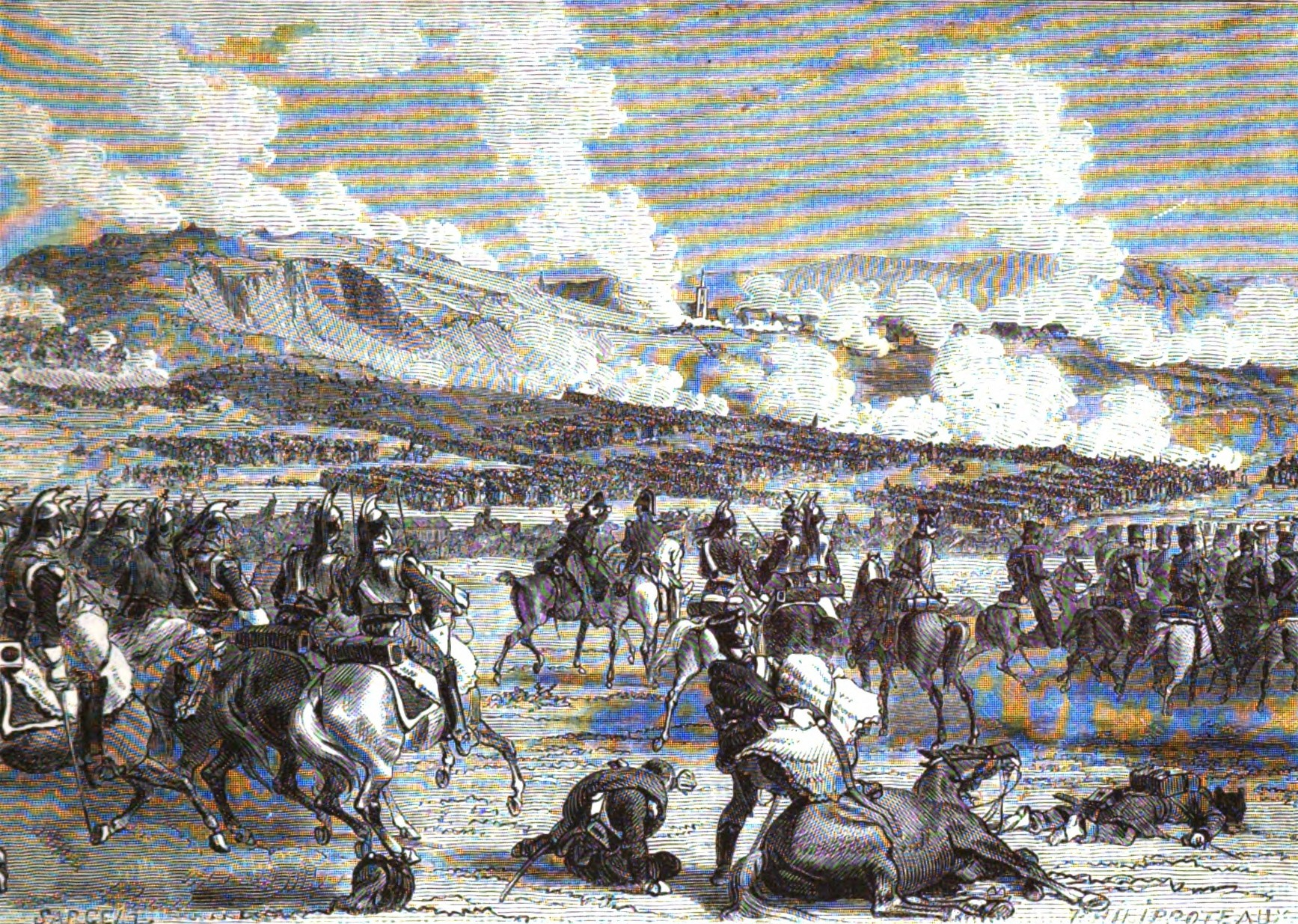
Saint-Sulpice's cuirassiers (left) wait in reserve at the Battle of Teugen-Hausen on 19 April 1809.

On the morning of 23 April in the Battle of Ratisbon, there was another wild cavalry melee between 56 squadrons of Austrian horsemen and the French cavalry of Nansouty, Saint-Sulpice and Louis-Pierre Montbrun. The struggle went on for two hours before the Austrians withdrew. On 15 May, the 1st Cuirassiers numbered 527 troopers. At the Battle of Aspern-Essling on 21–22 May, the division of Saint-Sulpice reached the battlefield late on the first day as Napoleon found himself with 31,400 soldiers facing 100,000 Austrians with a river at his back. Reinforced in the night to 50,000 infantry, 12,000 cavalry and 144 guns, Napoleon ordered an advance by his infantry and cavalry on the Austrian center. This attack pressed back the Austrians until their army commander Archduke Charles, Duke of Teschen led forward the Reserve Corps. Despite a series of cavalry charges, the French were pushed back into their small bridgehead and forced to retreat that night.

At the Battle of Wagram on 5–6 July 1809, the 1st Cuirassiers numbered 486 men. At mid-morning a crisis arose as the Austrian III and VI Corps advanced menacingly against Napoleon's left flank. The VI Corps brushed aside an isolated French infantry division on the far left while the III Corps threatened to smash the Franco-Allied left center. To gain time, Napoleon ordered Marshal Jean-Baptiste Bessières to lead the divisions of Nansouty and Antoine-Louis Decrest de Saint-Germain (leading Saint-Sulpice's former division) in charging the Austrians. While the Austrians were occupied in fending off the French heavy cavalry, Napoleon collected a battery of over 100 artillery pieces backed by Jacques MacDonald's corps and the Imperial Guard. At the same time the French emperor ordered Marshal André Masséna to march his corps from the center to the left flank. A little later, Saint-Germain's horsemen were instructed to cover Masséna's maneuver. These measures were successful in halting the Austrian advance, but the heavy cavalry lost 1,200 horses, not counting the human casualties.

Berckheim was appointed officer of the Légion d'Honneur on 11 July 1809 and promoted general of brigade the following day. He was named a Baron of the Empire on 9 March 1810. His younger brother Chrétien-Frédéric became his aide de camp on 12 November 1811. Berckheim was appointed aide de camp to Napoleon's equerry Alexis Jean Henri Duverger.

=== 1812–1814 ===
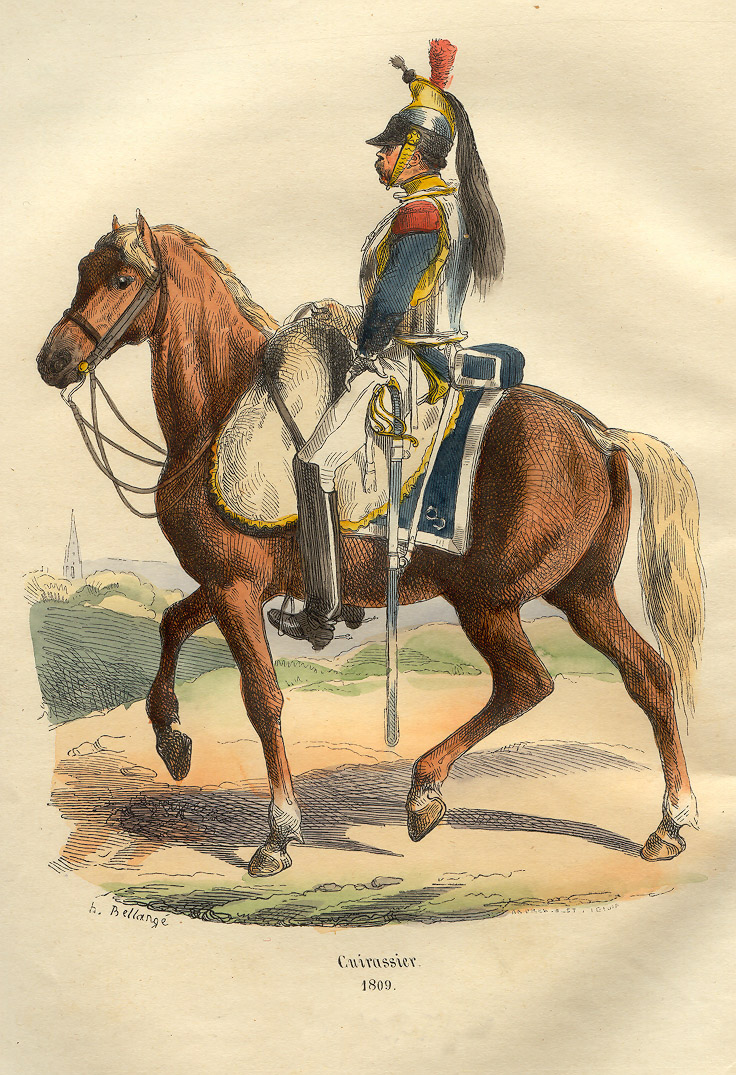
French Cuirassier in 1809

Berckheim led a cavalry brigade during the French invasion of Russia in 1812. The brigade was part of Jean-Pierre Doumerc's 3rd Cuirassier Division in the III Cavalry Corps under Emmanuel de Grouchy. Like all three of Doumerc's brigades, Berckheim's brigade consisted of only one strong regiment, the 4th Cuirassiers, with 35 officers and 821 rank and file. The other two brigades were led by Samuel-François Lhéritier (7th Cuirassiers) and Ignace Laurent Oullenbourg (14th Cuirassiers). At the First Battle of Polotsk on 18 August 1812, Marshal Laurent Gouvion Saint-Cyr surprised the Russians and drove them back. The Russian commander Peter Wittgenstein ordered a cavalry counterattack led by elements of the Chevalier Guard Regiment that broke through a gap in the Franco-Allied lines. Saint-Cyr repulsed the Russians when he threw in a Swiss infantry regiment and Berckheim's 4th Cuirassiers.

Doumerc's division also fought at the Second Battle of Polotsk on 18–20 October 1812. The 23,000 Franco-Allies fought 40,000 Russians to a draw, but the survivors were so few that they had to retreat. On 26 November, the 3rd Cuirassier Division fought at the Battle of Berezina. That day Marshal Nicolas Oudinot with 11,000 infantry and Doumerc's cuirassiers assumed a position covering the key bridges over which Napoleon's army was escaping. On 27 November, Oudinot's troops repelled enemy attacks, but on the following day the Russians were close to breaking through. Doumerc's horsemen made a climactic charge and crushed the Russians with heavy losses; after that, they declined to close with the French. Berckheim's youngest brother Philippe-Gustave became a captain of cuirassiers and died during the 1812 campaign.

At the Battle of Lützen on 2 May 1813, Berckheim commanded the 1st Brigade in Étienne Tardif de Pommeroux de Bordesoulle's 1st Heavy Cavalry Division in the I Cavalry Corps. The 363-man brigade consisted of the 2nd (151), 3rd (110) and 6th Cuirassiers (102). According to one source, only the 2nd Cuirassiers came into action that day. On 20–21 May at the Battle of Bautzen, Berckheim's brigade numbered 504 troopers of the 2nd (210), 3rd (199) and 6th Cuirassiers (95). This time only the 3rd Cuirassiers were engaged in action.

For the Battle of Dresden on 26–27 August 1813, Berckheim commanded the 1st Light Cavalry Division in Victor de Fay de La Tour-Maubourg's I Cavalry Corps. The division arrived late on the first day, but participated in Marshal Joachim Murat's grand cavalry attack on the second day. In this action, the 1st Light Cavalry Division attacked an Austrian infantry square and forced it to surrender. Because it was raining hard, most foot soldiers could not fire their muskets, allowing the cavalry to approach very close to the infantry. Berckheim was promoted general of division on 3 September 1813.

During the Battle of Leipzig on 16–19 October 1813, the 1st Light Cavalry Division numbered 1,850 sabers and had nine artillery pieces attached. Both Berckheim and Jean Corbineau are listed as the commander. The three cavalry brigades were led by Hippolyte Piré, Aime-Sulpice Pelletier de Montmarie and Cyrille Simon Picquet. Pire's brigade included the 6th, 7th and 8th Hussars; Montmarie's brigade consisted of the 1st and 3rd Chevau-léger Lancers and the 16th Chasseurs à Cheval; and Picquet's brigade comprised the 5th and 8th Lancers. Montmarie was killed in the fighting. At the Battle of Hanau on 30–31 October, Berckheim led the 1st Light Cavalry Division. The units which came into action were the 1st, 3rd, 5th and 8th Lancers, 7th Hussars, 16th Chasseurs à Cheval and 1st Italian Chasseurs à Cheval.

At the beginning of the Allied invasion of France at the end of December 1813, the commander of the V Cavalry Corps, Édouard Jean Baptiste Milhaud suggested to Napoleon that Alsatian volunteers might be formed into a cavalry-infantry legion. Milhaud recommended that the locally popular Berckheim be appointed its leader. However, Napoleon did not authorize the unit's formation.

In March 1814, Berckheim took command of an 1,807-strong cavalry division consisting of two brigades under Jean Nicolas Curely and Pierre Mourier. Curely's brigade was made up of the 1st (406), 2nd (492) and 3rd (179) Provisional Regiments of Hussars, Chasseurs à Cheval and Lancers. Mourier's brigade included the 1st Provisional Regiment (501) of cuirassiers and carabineers and the 2nd Provisional Regiment (229) of dragoons. On 14 March, the new division arrived in the field with Napoleon's army. On 19 March Napoleon personally accompanied two French cavalry divisions from Plancy-l'Abbaye to Méry-sur-Seine. Evidently, these were the divisions of Berckheim and Louis-Michel Letort de Lorville because the next day Letort was recalled to Arcis-sur-Aube with a pontoon bridge that had been captured. In a skirmish with Allied cavalry the following afternoon, Letort's division was driven back to Méry despite the assistance of Curely's brigade. That night, Letort set out again, leaving the pontoons with Berckheim. On 21 March, Berckheim's division joined the main army at Arcis. These actions were part of the Battle of Arcis-sur-Aube. On 22 March, Berckheim's division accompanied Napoleon's army as it moved east, crossing the Marne River near Vitry-le-François.

== Restoration ==
In 1816 Berckheim married Elisabeth Barthodi (1789–1858). The couple had two children, Gustave (1818–1824) and Elisabeth Octavie (1820), neither of whom survived childhood. Another source mentioned only a son who died at a young age. After Berckheim's death, Elisabeth remarried Marquis de Boubers from a noble family of Artois. During the Hundred Days, Berckheim rallied to Napoleon. This deeply troubled his older sister Henriette, who was married to the banker Augustin Perier and opposed to Napoleon's return. Under the Bourbon Restoration Berckheim was elected to the Chamber of Deputies for Haut-Rhin on 2 August 1815 and again on 4 October 1816, voting with the Constitutional Royalists. Thanks to the patronage of the Duke of Angoulême he was named Inspector General of Cavalry. He was made Chevalier of the Order of Saint-Louis. He died at Paris on 28 December 1819. BERCKHEIM is inscribed on the east side of the Arc de Triomphe. He is buried in the Père Lachaise Cemetery in Paris, in the 24th division, 1st line.
