= 3rd Swiss Regiment (France) =

- 3e régiment suisse
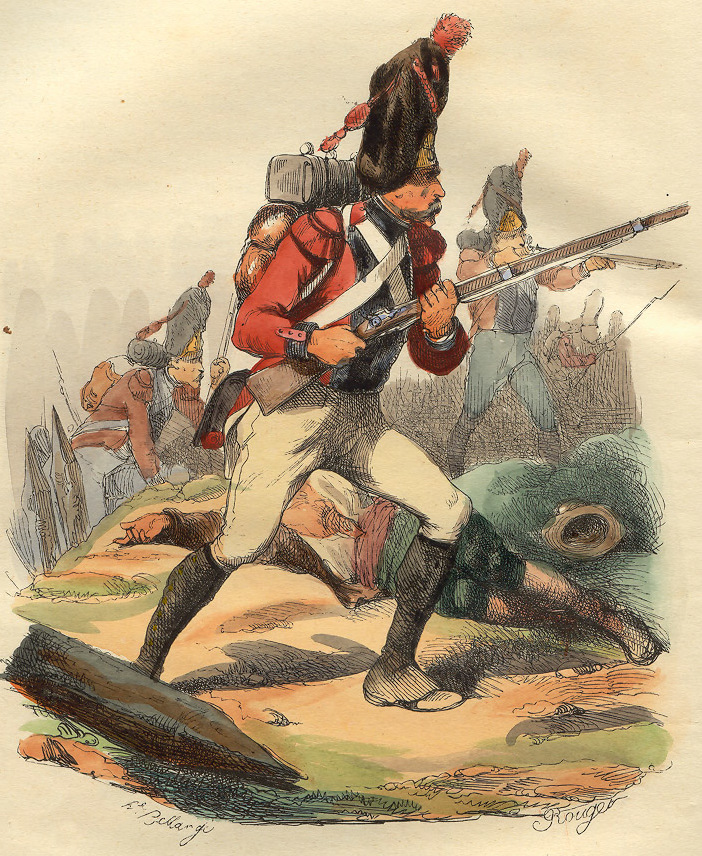
- A grenadier of the 3rd Swiss Regiment.
- Active: 1806–c. 1814
- Country: France
- Allegiance: French Imperial Army
- Branch: Army
- Type: Infantry regiment

The 3rd Swiss Regiment (French: 3e régiment suisse) was an infantry regiment of the French Imperial Army. The regiment served as a mercenary unit.

== History ==
The regiment was established by a decree on 12 September 1806, and was garrisoned in Lille. Initially, Colonel Louis de May was the regiment's commander, while Colonel Thomasset was the regiment's second-in-command. By the end of 1807, the regiment reached a strength of 2,711 men. Major Weber was appointed the regiment's acting commander when Colonel Louis de May was imprisoned.

During the Battle of Bailén in 1808, the 1st Battalion was caught in the capitulation of the French forces, with most of its men being taken prisoner.

The regiment also participated in the French invasion of Russia. At the First Battle of Polotsk, the regiment's losses were particularly high. At the Battle of Berezina, the regiment participated as part of Brigade Coutard of the 9th Division of the Grande Armée. The regiment was disbanded in around 1814.

== Uniforms and equipment ==
The uniform of the 3rd Swiss Regiment consisted of a red uniform with black facings and white piping. The uniform also had black lapels and cuffs as well as a black collar. The shako was reserved for non-commissioned officers, center-company soldiers, and voltigeurs, while the bearskin cap was intended for grenadiers.
