= George Nafziger =

American historian and writer (born 1949)

- Born: George F. Nafziger; 1949 (age 76–77); Lakewood, Ohio, U.S.
- Writing career
- Language: English
- Genre: Military history
- Website: nafzigercollection.com

George F. Nafziger (born 1949) is an American writer and editor of books and articles in military history.

== Biography ==
He was born in 1949, in Lakewood, Ohio, to Betty and George Nafziger.

He worked in a US Department of State program known as ACOTA, where he trained African officers in peacekeeping operations from 2002 to 2012.

== List of works ==
=== Middle East ===
- Nafziger, George & Walton, Mark, Islam at War (Westport, CT: Praeger, 2003). ISBN 0275981010

=== Medieval wars ===
- Colonel Hardy de Perini. French Military Campaigns 1214 to 1542. Translated by G. F. Nafziger. (self published)
- Commandant de Coynart. The Battle of Dreux, 1562. Translated by G. F. Nafziger. (self published)
- Delpech, Henry. The Battle of Muret (1213) and the Cavalry Tactics in the 13th Century. Translated by G. F. Nafziger.
- Gigon, S.C., The Third war of Religion: The Battles of Jarnac and Moncontour (1568-1569) Translated by George Nafziger, (self published 2012)
- de la Combe, F., Chalres the Bold: The Siege of Nancy (1476-1477) Translated by George Nafziger, (self published 2013)
- de la Barre Duparcq, Cpt. Military History of Prussia From 1325 Through the War of the Austrian Succession Translated by George Nafziger, (self published 2012)
- Schlumberger, G., Expedition of the Almugavars or Catalan Routiers in Byzantium (1302-1311) Translated by George Nafziger, (self published 2011)

=== Wars between 1600 and 1700 ===
- Baron von Holtzendorf. War of Bavarian Succession (1778–1779). Translated by G. F. Nafziger.
- Sautai, Maurice. The Battle of Malplaquet. Translated by G. F. Nafziger.

Rambaud, A., The Russians and Prussians During the Seven Years War Translated by George Nafziger, (self published 2013)

- Dabormida, V., The Battle of Assiette, 1747 Translated by George Nafziger, (self published 2012)
- Pichat, H., Maurice de Saxe's 1745 Campaign in Belgium Translated by George Nafziger, (self published 2011)
- Rousseau, A., The King of France's 1744-1745 Campaign Translated by George Nafziger, (self published 2012)
- St. Simon, Marquis de, History of the War in the Alps, or the Campaign of 1744 Translated by George Nafziger, (self published 2012)
- de la Roziere, C., Campaign of the Marechal de Crequy in Lorraine and Alsace in 1667 Translated by George Nafziger, (self published 2012)
- de Montholon, Count de, The Wars of Marshal Turenne Translated by George Nafziger, (self published 2011)
- Marchal, Cpt., Wars of Louis XIV (1664-1714) Translated by George Nafziger, (self published 2013)
- de Merveilleux, D.F., The 1695 Namur Campaign Translated by George Nafziger, (self published 2013)
- de la Roziere, C., The 1674 Flanders Campaign of Louis, Prince de Conde (Battle of Seneffe) Translated by George Nafziger, (self published 2013)
- d'Aumale, Duke, Conde's First Campaign (Rocroy and Thionville 1643) Translated by George Nafziger, (self published 2013)

=== The Seven Years War ===
- Moulliard, Lucien. The French Army of Louis XV. Translated by G. F. Nafziger.
- Nafziger, George F. The Prussian Army of Friedrich der Grosse. Two volumes.

=== Napoleonic works ===
- Nafziger, George F., The End Of Empire: Napoleon's 1814 Campaign (Solihull: Helion and Company, 2015)
- Nafziger, George F. Imperial Bayonets. (London; Greenhill Books, 2000).
- Nafziger, George F. Napoleon's Invasion of Russia. (Novato, CA: Presidio, 1988).
- Nafziger, George F., Napoleon at Leipzig, the Battle of Nations 1813 (Chicago: Emperor's Press, 1996).
- Nafziger, George F., Napoleon at Dresden, The Battles of August 1813 (Chicago: Emperor's Press, 1994).
- Nafziger, George F., Lutzen and Bautzen, Napoleon's Spring Campaign of 1813 (Chicago: Emperor's Press, 1992).
- Nafziger, George F., Historical Dictionary of the Napoleonic Era (Lanham, MD: Scarecrow Press, 2002).
- Nafziger, George F., Gioannini, M., The Defense of the Napoleonic Kingdom of Northern Italy, 1813-1814 (West Port, CT: Praeger, 2002).
- Anonymous. Operations of the 7th Polish Light Cavalry Division in the Leipzig Campaign. Translated/annotated by G. F. Nafziger.

=== World War II tactical studies ===
- Nafziger, George German Order of Battle, Panzers and Artillery in WWII (London, UK: Greenhill Books, 1999).
- Nafziger, George German Order of Battle, Infantry in WWII (London, UK: Greenhill Books, 2000).
- Nafziger, George German Order of Battle, Waffen SS and Other Units in WWII (Conshohocken, PA: Combined Books, Inc., 2001).
- Nafziger, George Bulgarian Order of Battle, World War II (self published 1995)
- Nafziger, George French Order of Battle In World War II, 1939-1945 (self published 1995)
- Nafziger, George Rumanian Order of Battle World War II: An Organizational History of the Rumanian Army in World War II (self published 1995)
- Nafziger, George Italian Order of Battle World War II (self published 1996) OCLC 39214181
- Nafziger, George The Growth and Organization of the Chinese Army (1895-1845) (self published 1999)
- Nafziger, George American order of battle in WWII (self published 2000) OCLC 51676940
- The United States Army. American Tank Company Tactics. Edited by G. F. Nafziger.
- The United States Army. Employment of Tanks With Infantry. Edited by G. F. Nafziger.
