= 2nd Swiss Regiment (France) =

French military unit (1806-1815)

- 2e régiment suisse
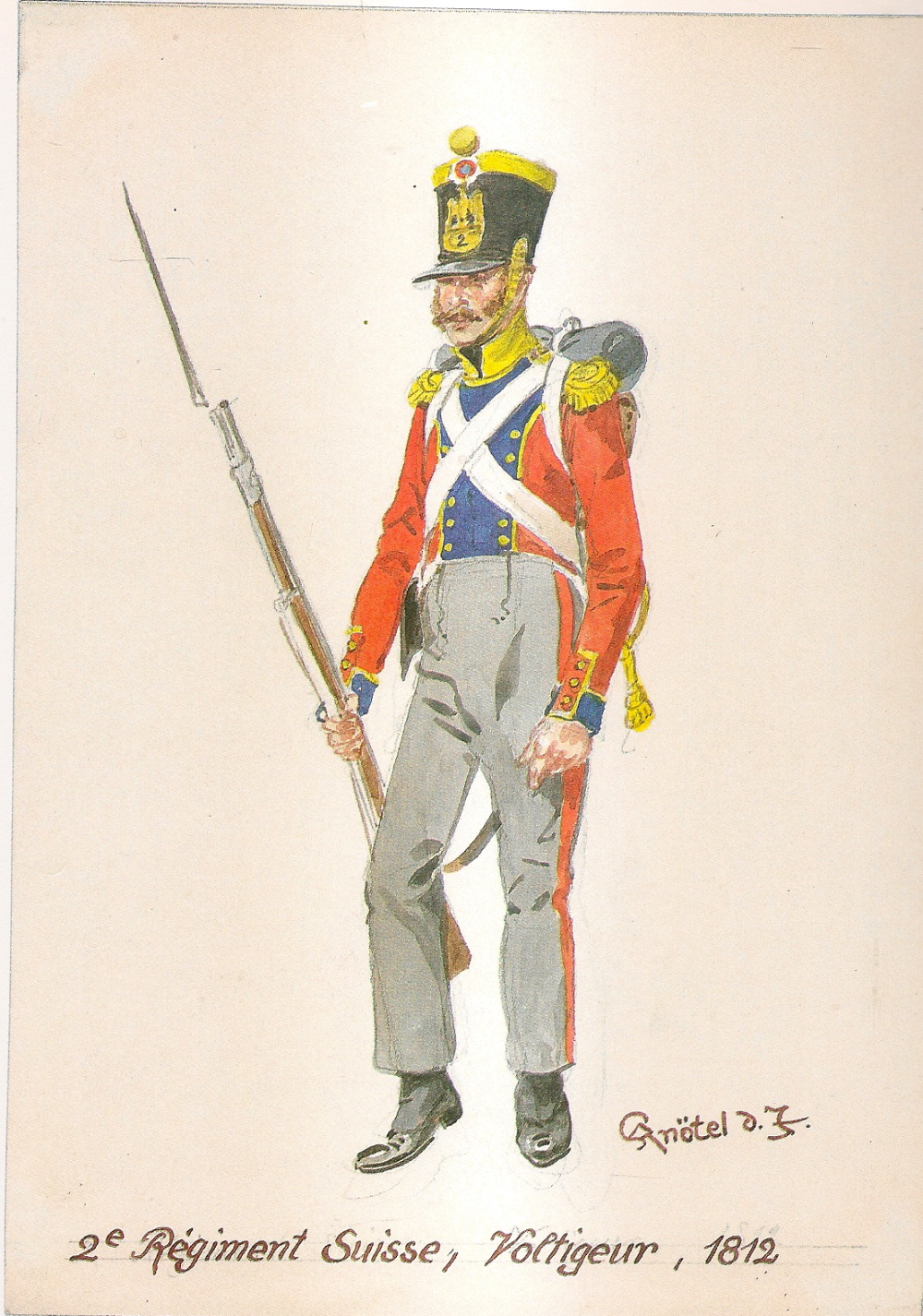
- Voltigeur of the 2nd Swiss Regiment in 1812. Illustration by Herbert Knötel.
- Active: 1806–1815
- Country: (Old Swiss Confederacy) Switzerland
- Allegiance: France
- Branch: French Army
- Type: Line infantry
- Size: Regiment
- Engagements: Napoleonic Wars

Commanders
- Colonel: Nicolas Antoine Xavier de Castella

The 2nd Swiss Regiment (French: 2e régiment suisse) was a Swiss mercenary infantry regiment that served in the French Army from 1806 to 1815. It was one of four Swiss regiments integrated into the Grande Armée during the Napoleonic Wars.

== History ==
The 2nd Swiss Regiment was raised by Emperor Napoleon in October 1806. In August 1807, the regiment was sent to the Gironde Observation Corps, which would participate in the invasion of Portugal. The unit fought in the Iberian Peninsula within the French Army of Spain (Armée d'Espagne), both in Portugal and Spain. In 1812, the 2nd Swiss was sent to Russia with the 9th division under the command of General Belliard. They entered Vilnius in June 1812. The regiment took part in the battles of Ostrovno, Vitebsk, Smolensk, Dorogobuzh and Borodino. They took part in the Battle of the Berezina during the retreat.

In 1813, the 2nd Swiss was in Saxony and took part in the Battle of Leipzig. After Napoleon's first abdication in 1814, the regiment was kept by the First Bourbon Restoration along with the three other Swiss regiments. On 2 April 1815, following Napoleon's return to power, the four regiments were dissolved and the 2nd (Swiss) Foreign Regiment was formed with Swiss soldiers who remained loyal to the Emperor; it participated in the Battle of Waterloo on 18 June 1815. During this campaign, the regiment had a total of 407 men, a small number compared to the other French line infantry regiments. The general staff consisted of 54 men, but the post of major remained vacant.

== See also ==
- 1st Swiss Regiment (France)
- Swiss mercenaries
