= SMS Grosser Kurfürst =

SMS Grosser Kurfürst (in German orthography: Großer Kurfürst) may refer to one of two vessels of the Imperial German Navy:

- SMS Grosser Kurfürst (1875), commissioned in 1875, one of Germany's first armored ships to be built in Germany.
- SMS Grosser Kurfürst (1913), commissioned in 1914, a battleship which served during World War I.

== See also ==
- SS Grosser Kurfürst, an ocean liner for North German Lloyd launched in 1899
- Frederick William, Elector of Brandenburg (1620–1688), the Great Elector (German: Großer Kurfürst), the namesake for these ships
