= Blockade of Maastricht (1814) =

Military blockade

- Part of the War of the Sixth Coalition
Date	18 January – 5 May 1814
Location	Maastricht, Meuse-Inférieure, France (present-day Netherlands)
Result	Inconclusive: French troops evacuate Maastricht after Napoleon's abdication

Belligerents
France	Austria; Prussia; Russia; Sweden; United Kingdom

Commanders and leaders
(First French Empire) Pierre Hugues Victoire Merle	(Sweden) Crown Prince Charles John (Sweden) Carl Henrik Anckarsvärd

The Blockade of Maastricht of 1814 was a military blockade of the then French fortified city Maastricht by the allied troops led by General Bernadotte. The blockade took place from late January to early May 1814 during the War of the Sixth Coalition between France and the other European powers, ending on 5 May of that year with the capitulation of Maastricht and the departure of the French.

== Background ==
Maastricht had become a French city since the successful Siege of Maastricht (1794) by General Kléber. The abolition of monasteries and chapterss brought an end to medieval estate society and the introduction of a new administrative organization and judiciary put an end to feudal society. Although a small group of Maastricht residents welcomed the 'progress', most of them accepted the changes passively, fully expecting them to be temporary. As the capital of the sparsely populated department Nedermaas, Maastricht was a quiet provincial town that attracted little attention from Paris. After 1800 the economy flourished somewhat. The abolition of the medieval system of crafts made free entrepreneurship possible and the many vacant monastery buildings provided cheap accommodation for new businesses.

In November 1799, Napoleon Bonaparte came to power in France. Due to the Concordat of 1801 with the Pope, there was more freedom for the practice of the Roman Catholic religion, which gave Napoleon a certain respect in largely Catholic Maastricht. In 1803 and 1811 Napoleon visited Maastricht, where he visited, among other things, the underground [imestone quarries of the Sint-Pietersberg and inspected the fortifications.

After Napoleon's catastrophic campaign to Russia in 1812, the tide turned for the French. From 16 to 19 October 1813, the Grande Armée, the army of the First French Empire, suffered a crushing defeat at the Battle of Leipzig (Battle of the Nations). The united armies of the Sixth Coalition pursued the French and set their sights on the capture of Paris and the return of all occupied territories.

One month after the Battle of the Nations, the proclamation of the Sovereign Principality of the United Netherlands took place on 20 November 1813 by the Provisional Government. On 30 November, the Prince of Orange, Willem Frederik of Orange-Nassau, who has been living alternately in London and Berlin since 1795, set foot again after 18 years. on Dutch soil (Landing of the Prince). On 2 December, the inauguration of King William I as sovereign monarch took place in the Nieuwe Kerk in Amsterdam. Initially, the Sovereign Principality consisted only of the Northern Netherlands, the former Republic of the Seven United Netherlands. It was not until 30 May 1814 that France would cede the Southern Netherlands to the Sovereign Principality in the Treaty of Paris, from 1815 onwards United Kingdom of the Netherlands called.

On 13 December 1813, due to the impending threat from the Coalition Army, martial law was proclaimed in Maastricht by Commander General Louis Charbonnier, French fortress commander of Maastricht under General Pierre Hugues Victoire Merle.

== Blockade ==
At the end of January 1814, army units of the Sixth Coalition Army completely enclosed the fortified city of Maastricht, occupied by the French. In the villages around Maastricht, troops from Austria, Prussia, Russia (Cossacks), Sweden, the United Kingdom and also some army units of the Sovereign Principality of the United Netherlands. There was hardly any shelling, so that in fact there was no question of a siege, but rather a blockade. However, some skirmishes took place when the French tried to break out of the fortress. The blockade caused great hardship in the city during the cold winter months. An outbreak of typhoid broke out among the French garrison, which considerably weakened the strength of the garrison. The ex-soldier Frederich Ludwig Behr did a very good job in the sick bay.

On 31 March 1814, Coalition troops occupied Paris and on 6 April, Napoleon Bonaparte forcibly abdicated the throne. Louis XVIII subsequently became king of France. The French garrison in Maastricht swore loyalty to the new king. On 19 April, the armistice was signed between the German-Estonian-Russian major general Georg Andreas von Rosen and the French general Pierre Hugues Victoire Merle. Within a few weeks the French troops left Maastricht. The first Dutch troops arrived on 3 May and on 5 May, Lieutenant General Dupont took over military command of the fortified city. The official Christiaan Bangeman Huygens took possession of the city on behalf of King Willem I, although this did not officially happen until 1 August.

The commander of the Allied army that had surrounded Maastricht for more than three months was an old acquaintance for the people of Maastricht: twenty years earlier, Bernadotte led a brigade in the army of Jean-Baptiste Kléber, the French general who succeeded in capturing the city of Maastricht in the autumn of 1794. Kléber had appointed Bernadotte as military governor of Maastricht, a position he only held for a short time. Bernadotte later became a Marshal of the Empire and was 'adopted' as Crown Prince of Sweden in 1810. He then defected to the Coalition and in 1814 led the Allied troops that set up the blockade of Maastricht. In 1818 he would be crowned Charles XIV John.

== Maastricht in the United Kingdom of the Netherlands ==
On 1 August 1814, Maastricht, together with several other places on the left bank of the Maas, was transferred to the sovereign prince of Orange. A few weeks later, on 24 and 25 September, the king visited Maastricht, where he attended, among other things, a ball in the Bonbonnière. A year after the lifting of the blockade, on 6 and 7 June 1815, he was back in the city, this time to inspect the fortifications, including the Fort Sint Pieter and the under construction Fort Willem I. William I would maintain a special bond with the city. In 1841 he married the Catholic, Maastricht-born countess Henriëtte d'Oultremont de Wégimont.

The relief after Napoleon's abdication and his exile to Elba was only short-lived. In February 1815 he managed to escape his place of exile and raise a large army. The so-called Hundred Days only came to a definitive end with the Battle of Waterloo on 18 June 1815. Napoleon's Hundred Days also led to some panic in Maastricht. The garrison was put on high alert and work immediately began on the construction of the Fort Willem I on the Caberg, a plan that had already been discussed several times. milling had been postponed.

When the United Kingdom of the Netherlands was founded by the Congress of Vienna in 1815, a new province of Limburg was formed, consisting of the current Belgian -Limburg and Dutch-Limburg, with Maastricht as its capital. The first governor was Charles de Brouckère, who resided in the old Government Palace on the Bouillonstraat. Commander-in-chief of the fortress was Guillaume Anne de Constant Rebecque de Villars. This started a difficult process of integration for the partly frenchized Maastricht, a process that could only be considered completed a century later.

== Sources ==
- Morreau, L.J. (1979): Bolwerk der Nederlanden. Van Gorcum, Assen. ISBN 90-232-1698-9
- Ubachs, Pierre J.H., and Ingrid M.H. Evers (2005): Historical Encyclopedia Maastricht. Walburg Press, Zutphen / Regional Historical Center Limburg, Maastricht. ISBN 90-5730-399-X
- Ubachs, Pierre J.H., and Ingrid M.H. Evers (2006): Two thousand years of Maastricht. An urban history. Walburg Press, Zutphen. ISBN 90-5730-441-4
- Jaspar, Edmond (1968): Kint geer eur eige stad? Maastricht (online tekst)
