= Friedrich der Grosse =

Friedrich der Grosse (spelled Große in German) is the German name for Frederick the Great, a ruler of Prussia. It is also the name of a number of German-built ships, namely:

- SMS Friedrich der Grosse (1911), a Kaiser-class battleship with 24,700-ton displacement
- SMS Friedrich der Grosse (1874), a Preussen-class ironclad with 6,800-ton displacement
- SS Friedrich der Grosse (1896), a civilian passenger ship with 10,500-ton displacement
- German battleship Friedrich der Grosse, a possible name of an unfinished battleship of the proposed H class
