= First Battle of Polotsk =

1812 battle during the French invasion of Russia

- Part of the French invasion of Russia
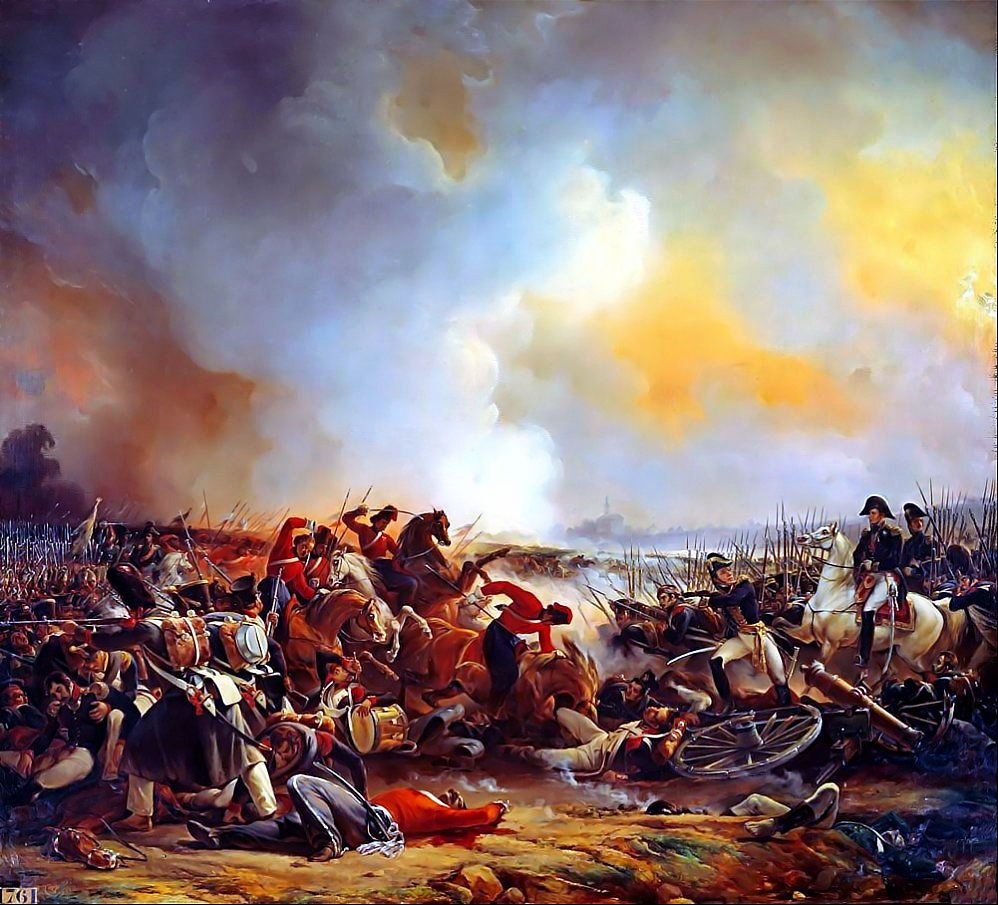
- Jean-Charles Langlois. Battle of Polotsk on August 18, 1812
Date	17–18 August 1812
Location	Polotsk, Russian Empire 55°29′N 28°48′E
Result	See § Aftermath

Belligerents
(First French Empire) French Empire; Kingdom of Bavaria	Russian Empire

Commanders and leaders
(First French Empire) Laurent de Gouvion Saint-Cyr (First French Empire) Nicolas Oudinot (WIA)	(Russian Empire) Peter Wittgenstein

Strength
18,000–19,000 men involved 150 guns 44,000 men total available	17,000–22,000 men 98 guns

Casualties and losses
2,500–6,000 casualties	1,800–5,500 killed and wounded 1,200–1,500 men captured 14 guns

French invasion of Russia
current battle
Prussian corps
Napoleon
Austrian corps

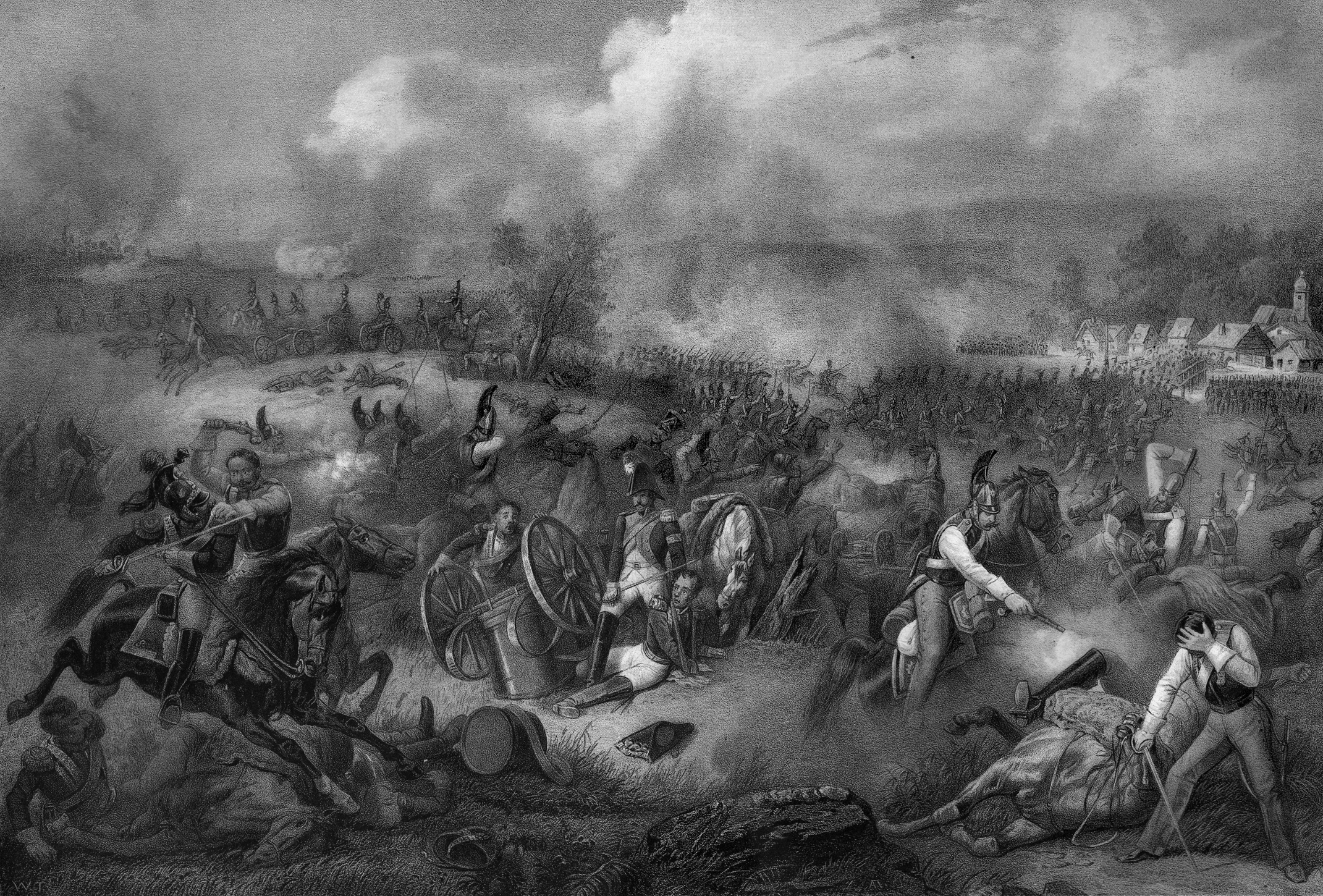
19th-century Russian lithograph depicting Wittgenstein's Chevalier-Guardsmen fighting the first battle of Polotsk.

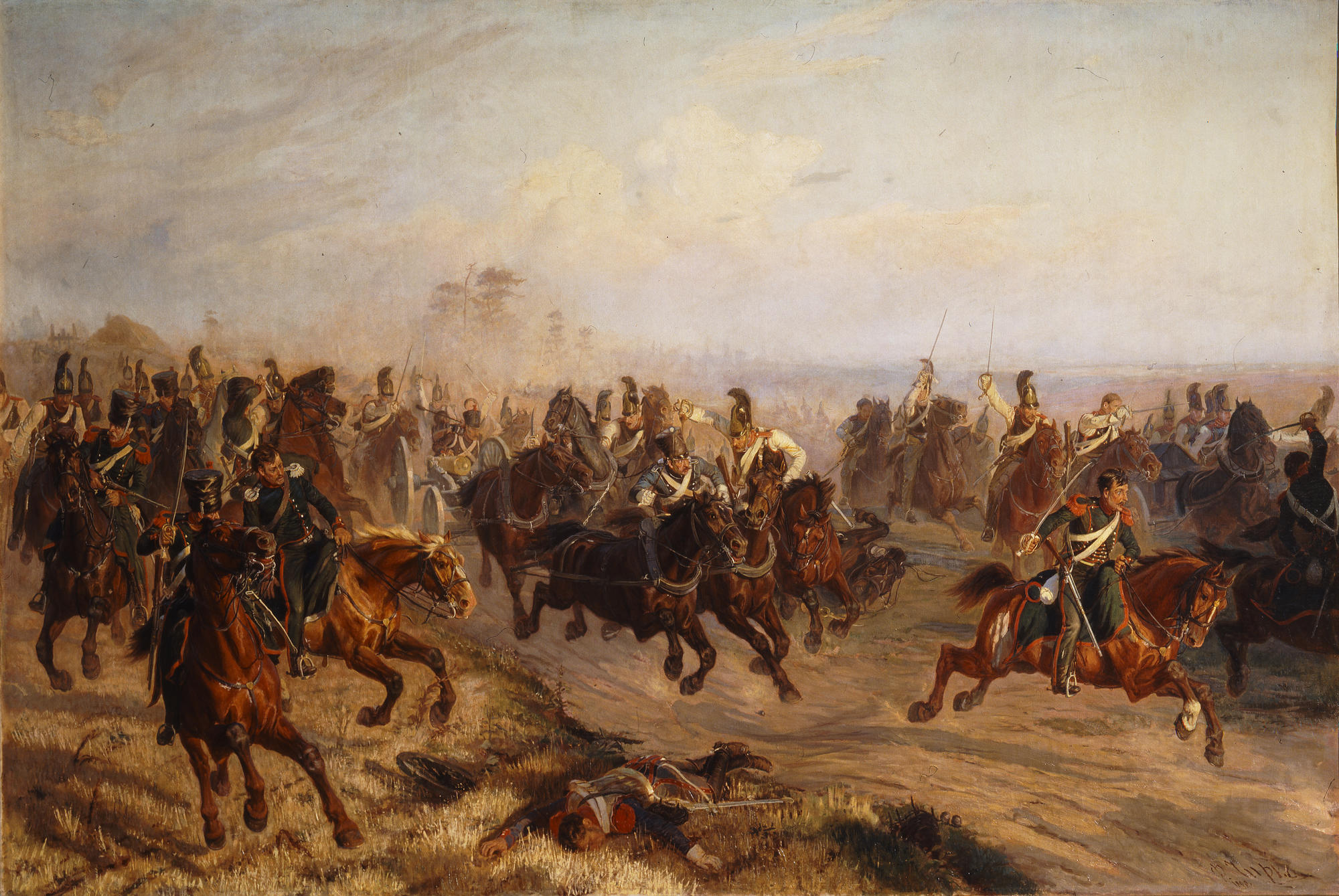
Pursuit of French chasseurs à cheval by Horse Guardsmen near Polotsk on 18 August 1812. Depicted by Philipp Chirko

In the First Battle of Polotsk, which took place on 17–18 August 1812, Russian troops under the command of Peter Wittgenstein fought French and Bavarian troops led by Nicolas Oudinot near the city of Polotsk, halting Oudinot's advance toward Saint Petersburg once more as at the Battle of Klyastitsy. It was a strategic Russian success, but tactically the battle ended in a draw. The First Battle of Polotsk should be distinguished from the Second Battle of Polotsk which took place during the same campaign two months later.

== Prelude ==
After the battle of Klyastitsy and several minor losses, Oudinot's Corps retreated to Polotsk.

== Battle ==
In the early morning of 17 August, the 1st Infantry Corps led by Wittgenstein attacked the French positions near the village of Spas, forcing the French to retreat. Oudinot transported additional units to the sector of the attack and also counterattacked in the centre. By the night both the French and the Russians managed to keep their positions. Oudinot was wounded and had to hand over the command to Gouvion Saint-Cyr.

The next morning Gouvion Saint-Cyr undertook a major offensive. He managed to mislead Wittgenstein about the area of the offensive, regroup his troops and suddenly attack the left flank and centre of the Russian positions. In the beginning the offensive was a major success, the French troops crushed the Russians and captured seven cannon.

When defeat seemed imminent, Wittgenstein organized a cavalry counterattack. It caused a scare among the French, who ceased the offensive and retreated. Wittgenstein retreated to the Drissa. Wittgenstein managed with his much smaller force to effectively halt the two French corps advancing on Saint Petersburg.

== Casualties ==
French-Bavarian losses numbered 6,000 killed, wounded. The Russians lost 5,500. Bavarian general officer losses were heavy. General of Infantry Bernhard Erasmus von Deroy was mortally wounded and General-Major Siebein was killed. General-Majors Vincenti and Raglovitch were both wounded. Among the French, both Oudinot and General of Brigade François Valentin were wounded. Russian Generals Berg, Hamen, and Kazatchkowski suffered wounds.

== Aftermath ==
Gaston Bodart does not give victory to either side; George Nafziger claims that Saint-Cyr "defeated Wittgenstein's numerically inferior force, but it was an inconclusive battle;" Dominic Lieven describes it as if it were a strategic victory for the Russians; Hugh Seton-Watson notes that both sides declared victory; Micheal Clodfelter defines it as a victory for the French. For the next two months both the French and the Russians did not attempt to upset the balance of powers.

== See also ==
- List of battles of the French invasion of Russia
- Second Battle of Polotsk

== Notes ==
Preceded by Battle of Smolensk (1812)	Napoleonic Wars; First Battle of Polotsk	Succeeded by Battle of Valutino
