= Second Battle of Polotsk =

1812 battle during the French invasion of Russia

- Part of the French invasion of Russia
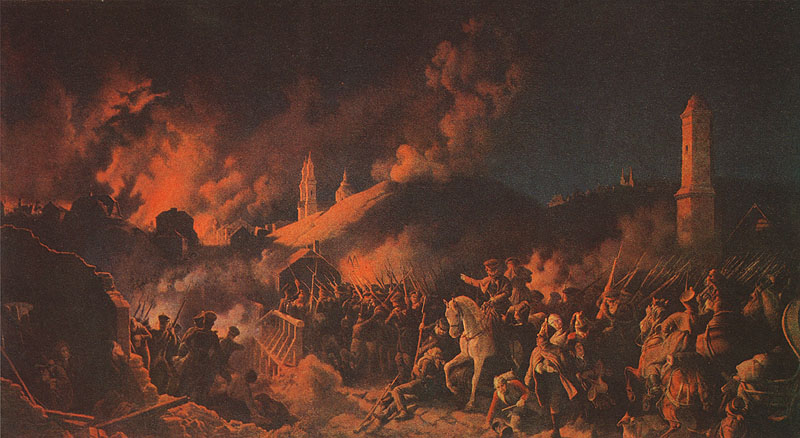
- Battle of Polotsk, by Peter von Hess
| Date | 18–20 October 1812 |
| Location | Polotsk, Russian Empire 55°29′N 28°48′E |
| Result | Russian victory |

Belligerents
| Russian Empire | (First French Empire) French Empire; Kingdom of Bavaria |

Commanders and leaders
| (Russian Empire) Peter Wittgenstein (Russian Empire) Fabian Steinheil | (First French Empire) (Kingdom of Bavaria) Laurent de Gouvion Saint-Cyr (WIA) |

Strength
| 40,000 regular troops; 9,000 militia | 23,000 to 27,000 troops |

Casualties and losses
| 8,000–12,000 | 6,000–8,000 |

French invasion of Russia
current battle
Prussian corps
Napoleon in command
Austrian corps

The Second Battle of Polotsk (18–20 October 1812) took place during Napoleon's invasion of Russia. In this encounter the Russians under General Peter Wittgenstein attacked and defeated a Franco-Bavarian force under Laurent Gouvion Saint-Cyr. In the aftermath of this success, the Russians took Polotsk and dismantled Napoleon's operations in Belarus. Wittgenstein's victory set the stage for the Battle of Berezina in November, in which three Russian armies converged on Napoleon from separate directions.

== Background ==
While advancing on Moscow, Napoleon left a contingent of French and German troops at Polotsk to guard his northern flank against Wittgenstein. The French defensive bastion at Polotsk, alternately commanded by St. Cyr and Oudinot and located about 200 miles (320 km) east of the Polish border and about 150 miles (240 km) northwest of Smolensk, was extremely important to Napoleon for several reasons.

By establishing a firm front at Polotsk, Napoleon kept Wittgenstein's command at bay. It was critical to French interests that Wittgenstein not be allowed to march south, because such an advance by the Russians would lead to Napoleon's Grande Armée, hundreds of miles to the east, being exposed to an attack in its rear while it was engaging the main Russian army near Moscow. Such a development would sever the Grande Armée's communications with Europe and it would be at risk of being encircled.

Furthermore, the French position at Polotsk was important because it served to protect Vitebsk, which was one of three massive supply depots Napoleon had established in western part of Russian Empire (nowadays Belarus). These three supply depots—the other two being Minsk and Smolensk—were to fuel Napoleon's war effort in the winter should the Grande Armée need to continue the campaign longer than originally anticipated.

Throughout the summer and early fall of 1812, Russians and French were stalemated at Polotsk, which meant that St. Cyr's troops were accomplishing their objective of holding the "Dvina Line". The first battle of Polotsk, an inconclusive engagement fought in August, had the effect of keeping Wittgenstein's army at bay and was therefore considered a success by Napoleon.

By mid-October, however, the strategic balance of power at Polotsk had shifted dramatically. Wittgenstein's force had been massively reinforced and was now numerically superior to the French force it confronted. Wittgenstein at this point was in command of close to 50,000 troops. This force was composed of 31,000 regular troops and 9,000 militiamen at Polotsk itself, and a second force of 9,000 troops under General Steingal operating in the rear and flank of Polotsk. Against this Russian juggernaut, the French under St. Cyr had no more than 23,000 to 27,000 troops. On 18 October, Wittgenstein opened his offensive against the French "Dvina Line".

== Battle ==
On the first day of combat, the Russians made seven consecutive frontal assaults on Polotsk, while Steingal's force began advancing on the French rear. The fighting at Polotsk was torrid and bloody, with the Russians losing close 8,000 to 12,000 troops, and the French suffering about 8,000 casualties. All seven Russian attacks were beaten back by the end of the day. St. Cyr could claim to have won round one in this bitter battle, but the affair was not over. Planning to renew his attack once Steingal's forces arrived, Wittgenstein maintained a heavy artillery bombardment of Polotsk, and before long much of the town was consumed by fire.

Late on the next day, 19 October, Steingal advanced to within four miles (6 km) of Polotsk, and St. Cyr realized he was threatened with encirclement. That night, knowing that their position was untenable, the French began evacuating Polotsk. Fierce house-to-house combat ensued in the town as the Russians launched their final attack.

Acting decisively to secure his battered forces' southern retreat route, St. Cyr ordered his Bavarian contingent to drive Steingal back early the following day, 20 October. This task was accomplished by the Bavarians impressively, as Steingal was compelled to retreat with heavy casualties. The French thus saved themselves from encirclement by the Russians, but still, the battle for Polotsk had been lost.

After three days of combat, St. Cyr's forces had been reduced to no more than 15,000 weary troops, in full retreat before Wittgenstein's 38,000 Russians. Two weeks later, Wittgenstein's troops captured the French supply depot at Vitebsk, inflicting a logistical disaster on Napoleon's fast collapsing Russian operation. Napoleon's northern front—the "Dvina Line"—was broken, and the consequences for Napoleon's Russian invasion were grim.

== See also ==
- List of battles of the French invasion of Russia

== See also ==
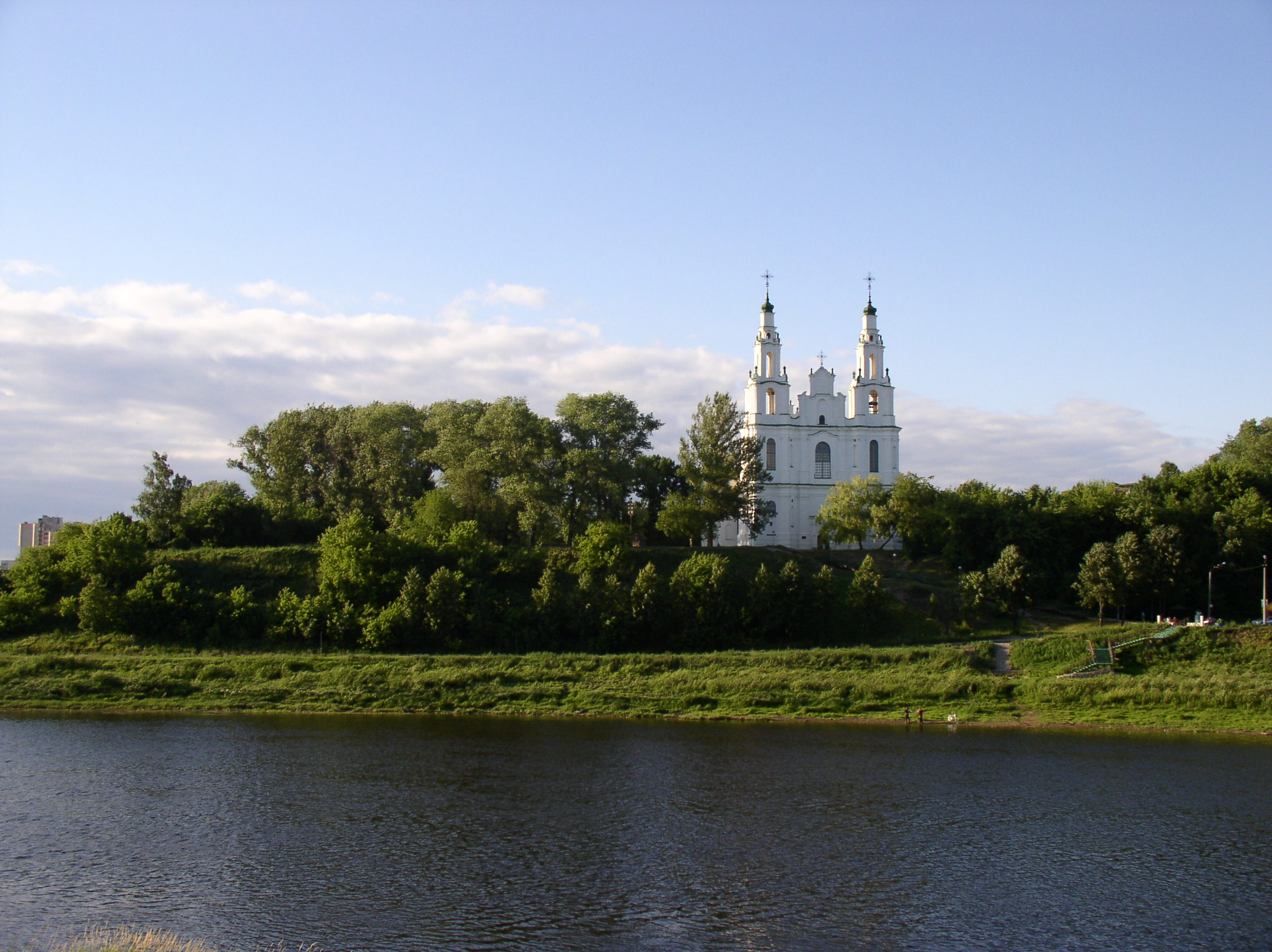
Modern view of the Dvina River in Polotsk.

- Cate, Curtis (1985). The war of the two emperors. Random House; 1st edition. ISBN 9780394536705.
- Chandler, David (1966). The Campaigns of Napoleon. Weidenfeld and Nicolson. ISBN 9780025236608.
- Smith, Digby (2004). Napoleon against Russia: a concise history of 1812.
- Zamoyski, Adam (1980). Moscow 1812: Napoleon's Fatal March. Harper Collins. ISBN 9780061075582.
- "Полоцк". Military Encyclopedia: In 18 Volumes. 1911–1915.

| Preceded by Battle of Tarutino | Napoleonic Wars; Second Battle of Polotsk | Succeeded by Battle of Venta del Pozo |
