= Elite Gendarmes of the Imperial Guard =

French military unit (1801–1815)

Elite Gendarmerie of the Imperial Guard
- Gendarmerie d'élite de la Garde impériale
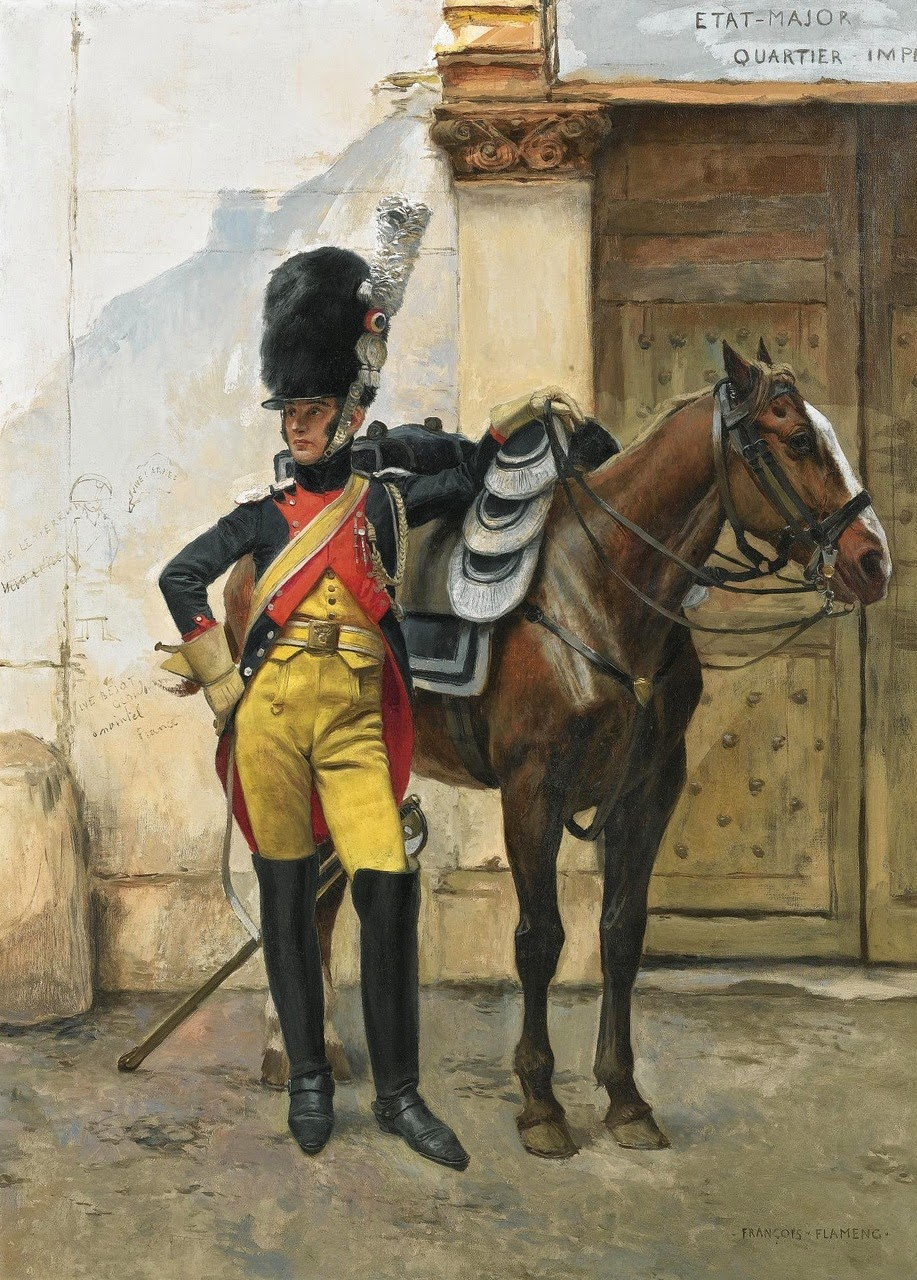
- An elite gendarme stands guard at Napoleon's headquarters. Painting by François Flameng.
- Active: 1801–1815
- Country: France
- Branch: French Army
- Type: Gendarmerie
- Size: One legion of two squadrons and two infantry companies (632 men, at full strength)
- Part of: Consular Guard (1802–1804); Imperial Guard (1804–1815)
- Garrison: Caserne des Célestins, Paris
- Nickname(s): "The Immortals" (Les Immortels)
- Engagements: Napoleonic Wars: Battle of Medina de Rioseco; Battle of Montmirail; Battle of Waterloo

Commanders
- Commanders: Anne Jean Marie René Savary; Antoine Jean Auguste Durosnel; Pierre Dautancourt

The Elite Gendarmerie of the Imperial Guard (French: Gendarmerie d'élite de la Garde impériale) was a French gendarmerie unit formed in 1801 by Napoleon Bonaparte as part of the Consular Guard which became the Imperial Guard in 1804. In time of peace, their role was to protect official residences and palaces and to provide security to important political figures. In time of war, their role was to protect the Imperial headquarters, to escort prisoners and occasionally to enforce the law and limit civil disorder in conquered cities.

The gendarmerie played a secondary role in the first campaigns of the Napoleonic Wars, ensuring the movements of the Emperor and the protection of lines of communication. Sent to Spain in 1808, the unit conducted counter-insurgency operations against Spanish guerrillas in addition to its usual service as a public force, sometimes also acting as heavy cavalry such as in Medina de Rioseco. Recalled from the peninsula in 1812 for the Russian campaign, the elite gendarmes of the Guard saw combat at the Battle of the Berezina, then at Leipzig, Montmirail and Vauchamps during the War of the Sixth Coalition.

Renamed the Gendarmes des chasses du roi under the First Bourbon Restoration, the gendarmerie retook its old name during the Hundred Days and took part in the Waterloo campaign. It was definitively disbanded at Châtellerault upon the Second Restoration.

== Organisation ==
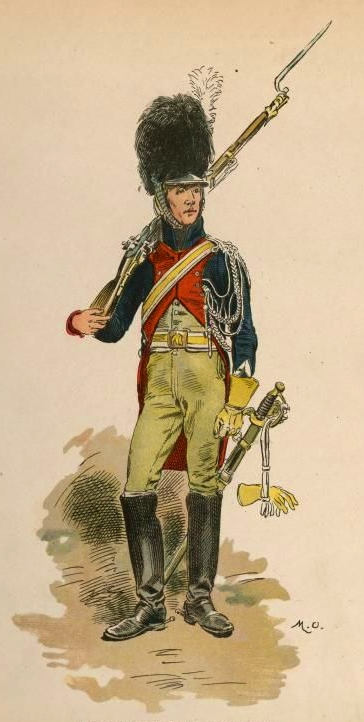
Elite gendarmerie infantryman by Maurice Orange

A squadron of elite gendarmes was raised in 1801 and integrated into the Consular Guard in 1802. In 1804 the unit, now part of the Imperial Guard, comprised two squadrons, each divided into two companies, in addition to two companies of foot gendarmes. On its formation, the gendarmerie was composed of 632 men, NCOs and officers. In 1806, the two companies of foot gendarmes were disbanded and only 456 mounted gendarmes remained in the unit. The men should be at least 1.76 metres (5 ft 9 in) tall in order to be recruited.

== Campaigns ==
Until 1808, the elite gendarmerie played only a secondary role in Napoleon's campaigns. In 1805, Austria and Russia declared war on France. Napoleon outpaced his adversaries, marched on Bavaria, defeated the Austrians at Ulm and crushed the Austro-Russians at Austerlitz. During this "lightning campaign", the elite gendarmerie provided logistical assistance for the Emperor's movements.

=== Peninsular War ===
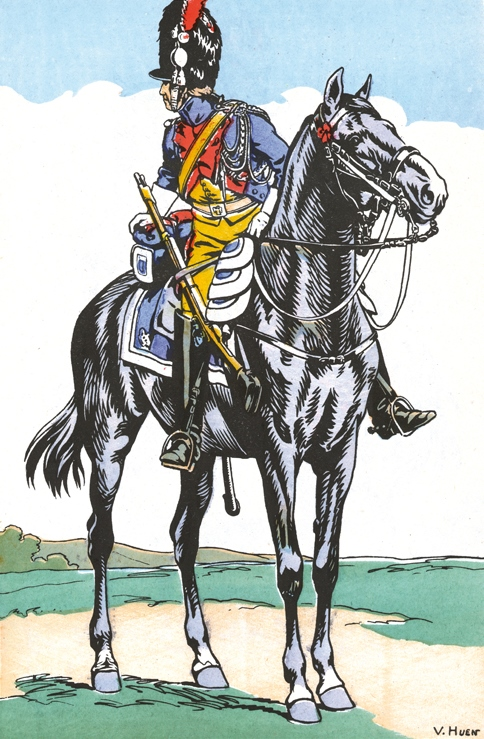
Elite gendarme of the Imperial Guard on patrol by Victor Huen

In 1808, the elite gendarmes entered Spain, alongside the other contingents of the Guard deployed to the Peninsular War. A first detachment of 5 officers and 100 gendarmes, commanded by Captain Noirot, was attached to Marshal Bessières' corps where it fulfilled its usual security role. A second detachment, composed of 85 men under Colonel-Major Jacquin, was stationed in Madrid.

On 2 May 1808, the residents of Madrid revolted against the French. Marshal Murat, who commanded the occupation troops, ordered the cavalry to put down the uprising. The mounted gendarmes fought the insurgents, which cost them a few wounded, including Colonel-Major Jacquin. A few months later, on 14 July, at the Battle of Medina de Rioseco, 57 elite gendarmes led by Captain Noirot charged the Spanish positions with General Lasalle's cavalry. In September, the unit was reorganized: 99 gendarmes remained with Bessières, 163 were assigned to General Saligny's reserve corps and 77 to the reserve brigade of the Guard infantry. At the he Battle of Burgos on 10 November, the elite gendarmes within Bessières' cavalry took part in the charge that pushed back the Spanish and secured the city for the French.

In early 1809, Napoleon, leaving Marshal Soult to pursue the British, returned to France and recalled most of his Guard for the campaign against Austria. In March 1810, no more than 6 officers and 101 gendarmes remained in Spain, who had to face the guerrillas on several occasions. On 23 March, a troop of five mounted gendarmes was attacked at La Puebla by guerrillas, who wounded one of them before fleeing upon the arrival of reinforcements. On 5 September, in Quintanapalla, a platoon of 40 gendarmes under Captain Jamin ran into a band of guerrillas. At the sight of the tall bearskin hats of the gendarmes of the Guard, the Spanish horsemen turned back without waiting for the shock. Vigorously pursued by the elite gendarmes, the Spanish lost 22 men and 10 horses before being able to disperse.

In early 1811, the gendarmerie of the Guard in Spain consisted of a 77-men detachment commanded by Captain Jamin, attached to the corps of General Dorsenne, where it fulfilled the dual role of security and counter-insurgency. This detachment still served at Astorga and Ciudad Rodrigo before leaving the peninsula definitively at the end of the year.

=== Invasion of Russia and Sixth Coalition ===
The elite gendarmes were recalled by Napoleon to take part in the invasion of Russia in 1812. The gendarmes saw combat twice in the campaign: at Orsha, to ensure the crossing of the Dniepr, and at the Berezina, during the crossing of the Studianka ford north of Barysaw. Despite the losses endured during the Russian campaign, the gendarmes fought at the Battle of Leipzig in 1813. The gendarmerie's strength increased to 1,174 men with the arrival of 640 conscripts.

In a notable episode, General Fournier-Sarlovèze was sent to Mayence Prison by Napoleon for his defeatist attitude, following defeat at Leipzig. En route to Mayence, his carriage was escorted by a detachment of gendarmes and was attacked by a group of Russian Cossacks. A gendarme was killed, but the general grabbed the sword of the dead, took the reins of the carriage and with the help of the remaining gendarmes routed the Cossacks. He then returned to his seat and stated "Go on! To Mayence!". The gendarmes fought the Russians again at Montmirail and Vauchamps during the invasion of France in 1814.

=== Hundred Days ===
Under the First Bourbon Restoration, the elite gendarmerie was renamed the gendarmerie des chasses. On his return to power in the Hundred Days, Napoleon restored the elite gendarmerie with two companies. Only the 1st company, commanded by Captain Dyonnet, participated in the Waterloo campaign; it saw action at the battles of Ligny and Waterloo. After the return of the Bourbons, the dissolution of the elite gendarmerie of the Imperial Guard was officially announced on 15 September 1815 and enforced on 26 September at Châtellerault.

== Police of the Empire ==
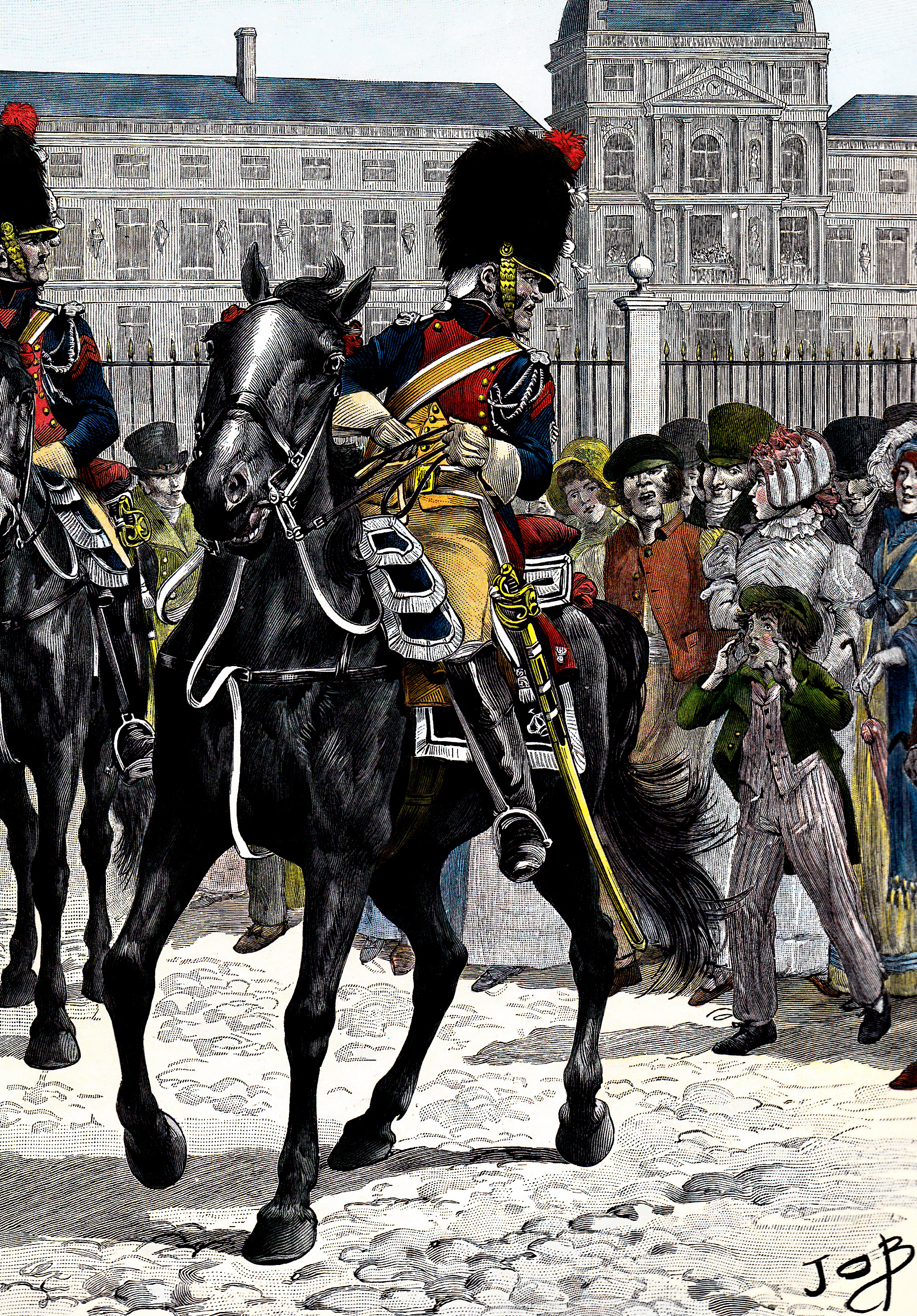
Elite gendarmes on duty outside the Tuileries Palace on the day of the King of Rome's birth. Illustration by Job.

The main role of the elite gendarmes was to provide security not only to high-ranking officials, but also to cities, both French and foreign. For this reason, other troops of the Grande Armée nicknamed them "The Immortals" (Les Immortels), as they were less engaged in combat than other units and thus had fewer personnel killed in action. The elite gendarmerie's activities were mostly restricted to Paris, under the direct command of the Emperor, and it only patrolled occupied cities during campaigns.

A platoon of sixteen elite gendarmes was responsible for the execution of the Duke of Enghien in 1804. That same year a detachment of the elite gendarmes escorted Napoleon in the streets of Paris for his coronation.

=== On campaign ===
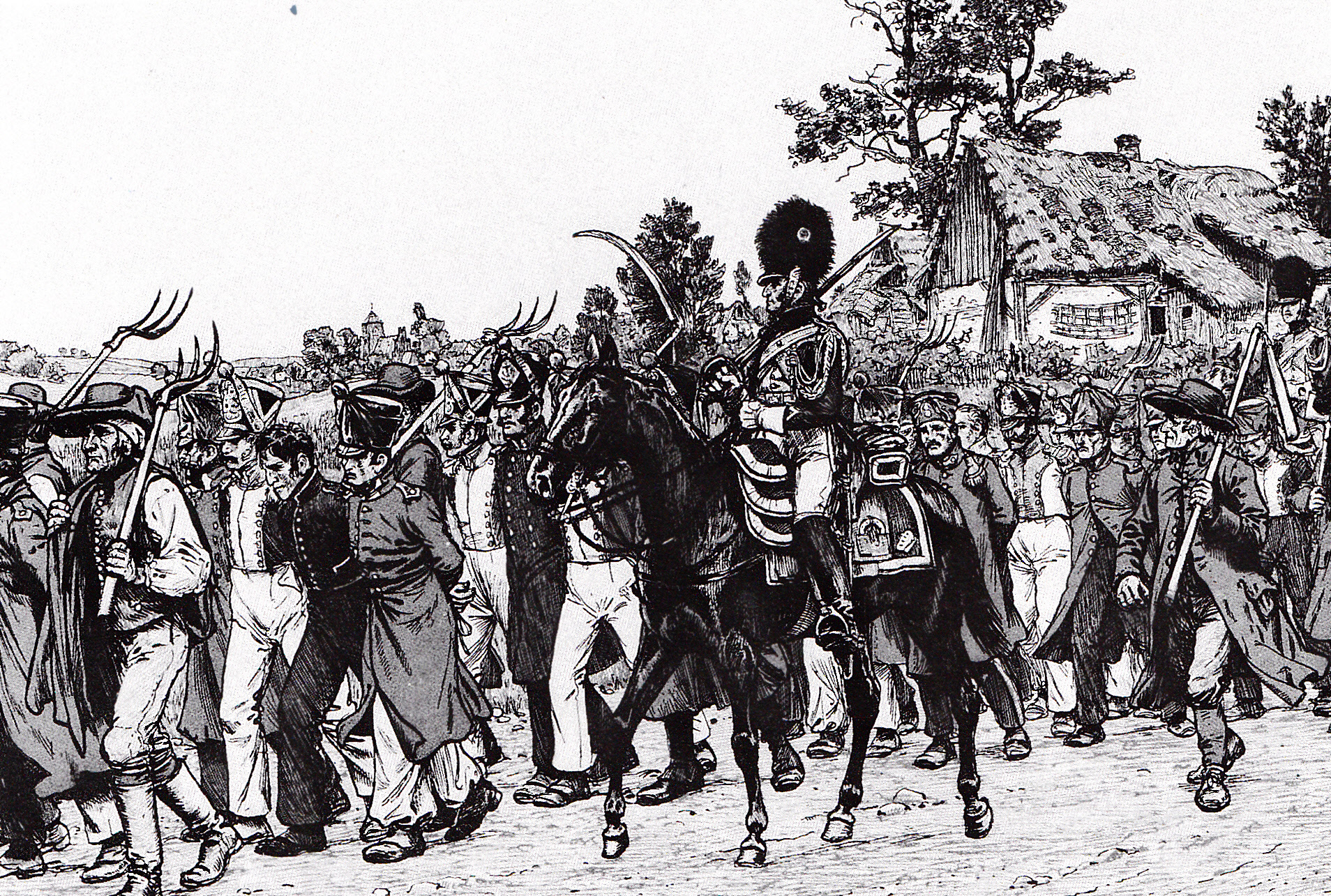
Elite gendarmes escorting captured deserters with the help of local peasants, during the German campaign of 1813. Illustration by Richard Knötel.

During the Emperor's military campaigns, the elite gendarmes were entrusted with the security of his headquarters, and usually stood guard at the entrance to tents. They were sometimes on duty with Napoleon, constituting the escort of the imperial general staff. They likewise accompanied the Emperor on the road during his travels by berline. The elite gendarmes escorted prisoners of war and guarded war trophies taken from the enemy. They also tracked down deserters, sometimes with the support of the local population.

=== In peacetime ===
At times of peace when the Emperor resided in his palaces, the elite gendarmerie was responsible for guarding the imperial apartments, monitoring the entrances and exits of buildings. They were thus responsible for security at the Tuileries, Saint-Cloud, and Schönbrunn palaces. This task was initially performed by the foot gendarmes, then, after they were disbanded in 1806, by the mounted gendarmes. The elite gendarmerie performed multiple duties while stationed in Paris: two cavalry detachments were assigned to the Tuileries and Malmaison to escort the Emperor; a foot detachment was assigned to the Tuileries and another one to the Temple Prison.

== Commanders ==
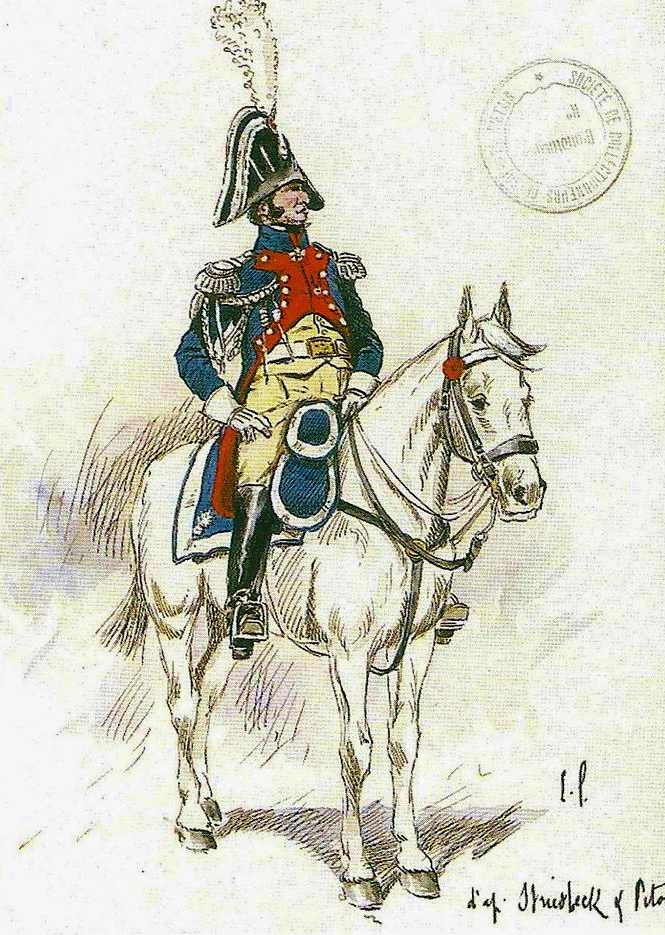
Colonel of the Elite Gendarmerie of the Imperial Guard. Illustration by Ernest Fort.

On 5 September 1801, Anne Jean Marie René Savary, later Duke of Rovigo, was appointed the first colonel of the elite gendarmerie. Chef d'escadron Jean-Baptiste Jacquin became the unit's deputy colonel in July 1805: during this period, chef d'escadron Delga commanded the foot gendarmes, while Jean-Pierre Henry and Pierre Dautancourt headed the two squadrons of mounted gendarmes. Henry was made deputy colonel on 30 May 1808 in replacement of Jacquin. On 8 June 1810, Savary was appointed Minister of Police and was succeeded by Antoine Jean Auguste Durosnel, Napoleon's aide-de-camp. During the Hundred Days, the Emperor gave command of the elite gendarmerie to General Pierre Dautancourt, who was responsible for its organization, although it was Captain Dyonnet who effectively led the unit in the Waterloo campaign.

== Uniform ==
The elite gendarmes wore a blue coat with red lapels, cuffs and turnbacks. The collar and cuff flaps were blue piped red. They wore buff breeches, waistcoat and gloves. They had white aiguillettes and clover-shaped epaulettes. They wore a tall bearskin cap with a visor, topped by a red round cloth patch nicknamed cul-de-singe ("monkey bottom") with a white grenade embroidered on it. They rode black horses. Belting was buff with white edges.

The trumpeter wore the same uniform but with reversed colours. They rode grey horses.

In 1815, crested helmets with black manes (red for trumpeters) were introduced but not completed, so the elite gendarmes fought their last campaign with mixed headgears.

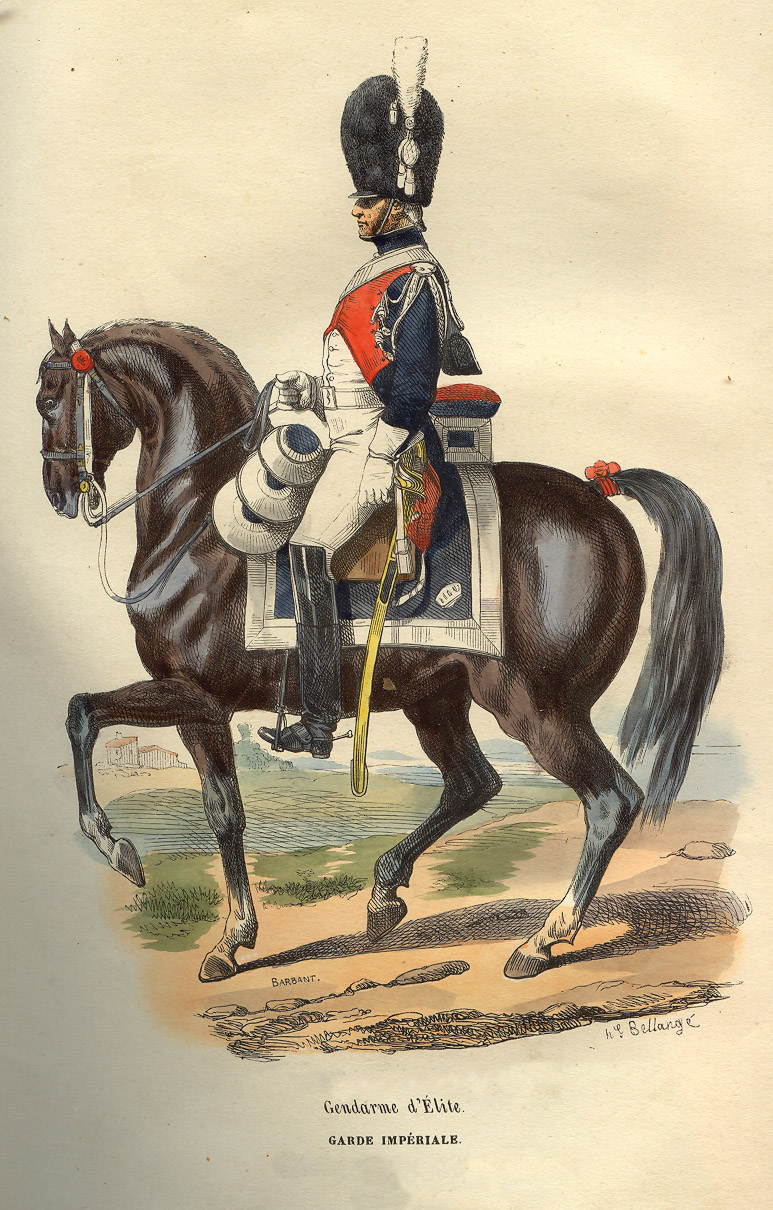
Gendarme

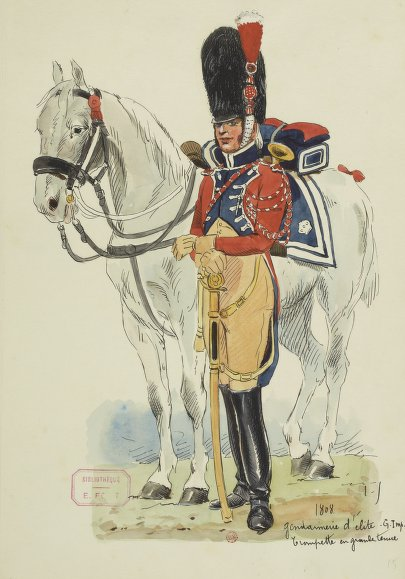
Trumpeter

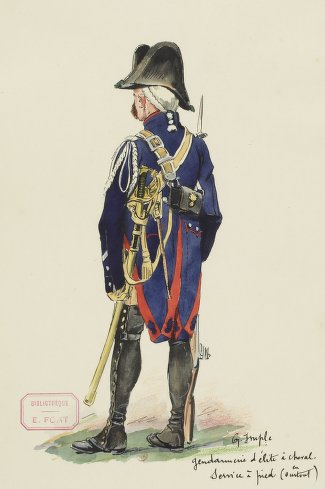
Dismounted service dress

== See also ==
- Gendarmerie nationale
- Imperial Guard Cavalry (First Empire)
