= Lithuanian Tatars of the Imperial Guard =

Military unit during the Napoleonic Wars

- Tartares Lituaniens de la Garde Impériale
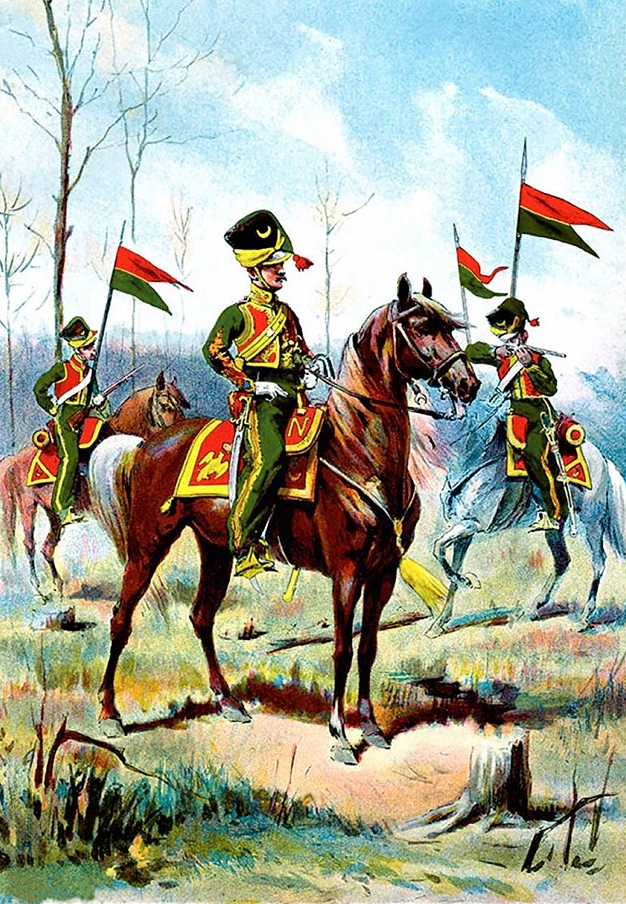
- Lithuanian Tatars of the Imperial Guard conducting a reconnaissance, by Bronislaw Gembarzewski (1896)
- Active: October 1812 – April 1814
- Country: First French Empire
- Branch: French Imperial Army
- Type: Light Cavalry
- Size: Squadron
- Part of: Imperial Guard
- Nickname: "Poniatowski's Cossacks"
- Engagements: Napoleonic Wars; French invasion of Russia; Battle of Vilnius; War of the Sixth Coalition; Battle of Dresden; Battle of Leipzig; Battle of Hanau

The Lithuanian Tatars of the Imperial Guard (French: Tartares Lituaniens de la Garde Impériale / Lithuanian: Imperatoriškosios Gvardijos Lietuvos totoriai) were a light cavalry squadron of Napoleon's Imperial Guard, in the service of the French Army from 1812 to 1814. The Lipka Tatars were organized into a single squadron at the beginning of the Russian Campaign. Their first commander was Squadron Leader Achmatowicz, who was killed at Vilnius and succeeded by Captain Ulan, who led the unit through the remainder of the war. Following the First Abdication of Napoleon, all foreign units were disbanded, and the regiment followed.

== Origins ==
The appellation "Tartars" was commonly used in the 17th and 18th centuries, but "Tatars" has become the common usage in recent times.

During the 14th century, several families from Tatar tribes in Crimea followed Grand Duke Vytautas to Lithuania, where they served as his personal guard at Trakai Island Castle. After the Polish–Lithuanian union in 1385, the Tatars divided and formed communities in several villages.

Unlike the Christian Lithuanian people, the Tatars were Muslims; they were granted religious freedom and were exempt from taxes, but still had to provide military service. In the 18th century, after the Partitions of Poland and Lithuania by Russia, Austria, and Prussia, the Tatars fell under Russian rule. Some Tatar volunteers served in the Army of the Duchy of Warsaw after the duchy's creation by Napoleon in 1807.

== Organisation ==
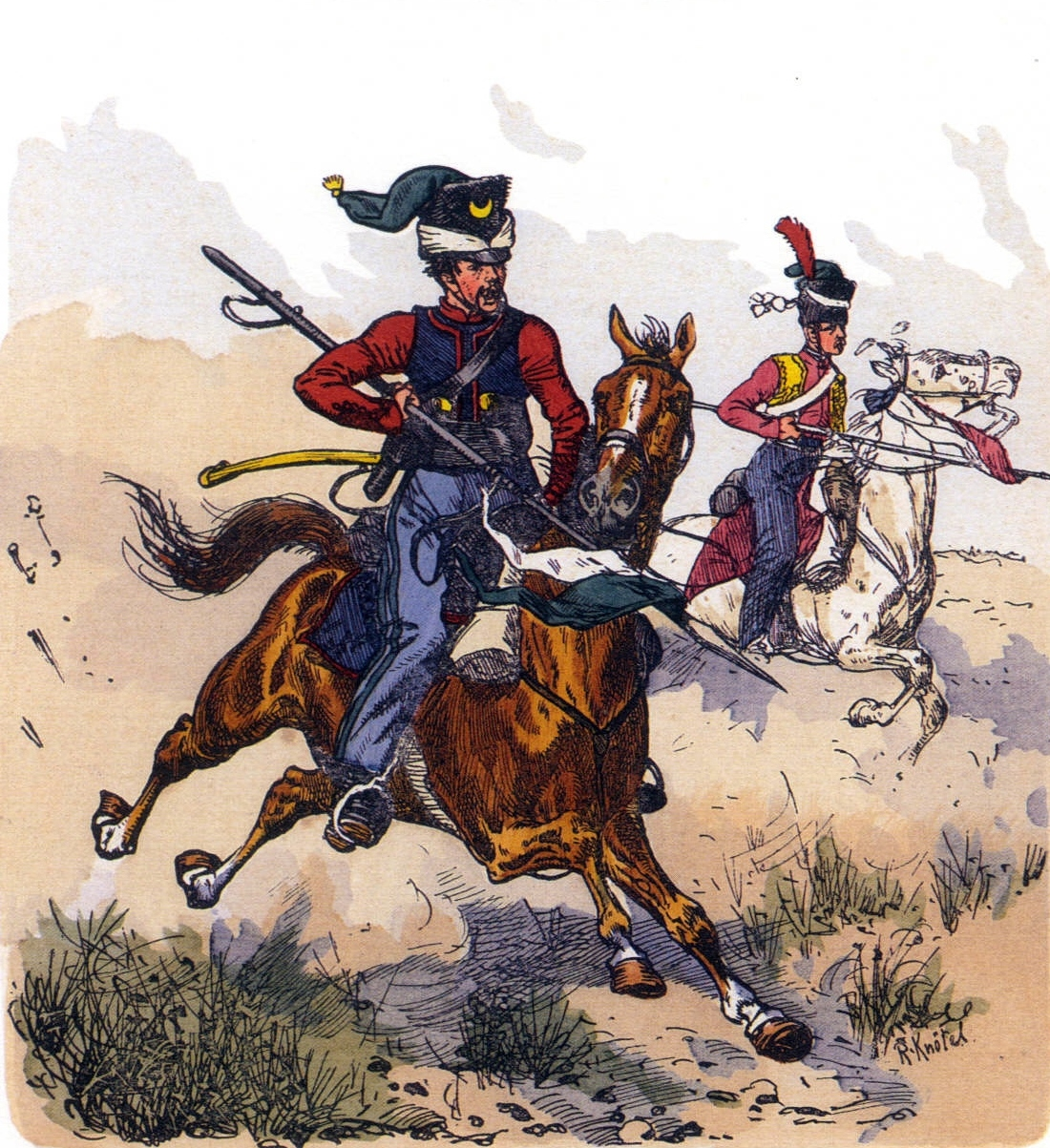
Lithuanian Tatars of the Imperial Guard at the charge, by Richard Knötel.

In June 1812, General Michał Sokolnicki suggested that Napoleon create a regiment of Lithuanian Tatars. He wrote of "their probity, as well as their courage were experienced […]". Despite Napoleon's hopes that the unit could comprise up to a thousand soldiers, only enough Tatar volunteers could be found to form a squadron. It was composed of 123 men including 1 squadron leader, 1 major, 4 captains, 7 lieutenants and second lieutenants, and 110 non-commissioned officers and soldiers. The squadron also had an imam named Aslan Aley, who also served as a second lieutenant.

The unit was officially created in October 1812 and was placed under the command of Colonel Mustapha Murza Achmatowicz, who paid for the squadron's equipment and uniforms. The Tatars were attached to the 3rd Lithuanian Lancers Regiment of the Imperial Guard as scouts.

== Military campaigns ==
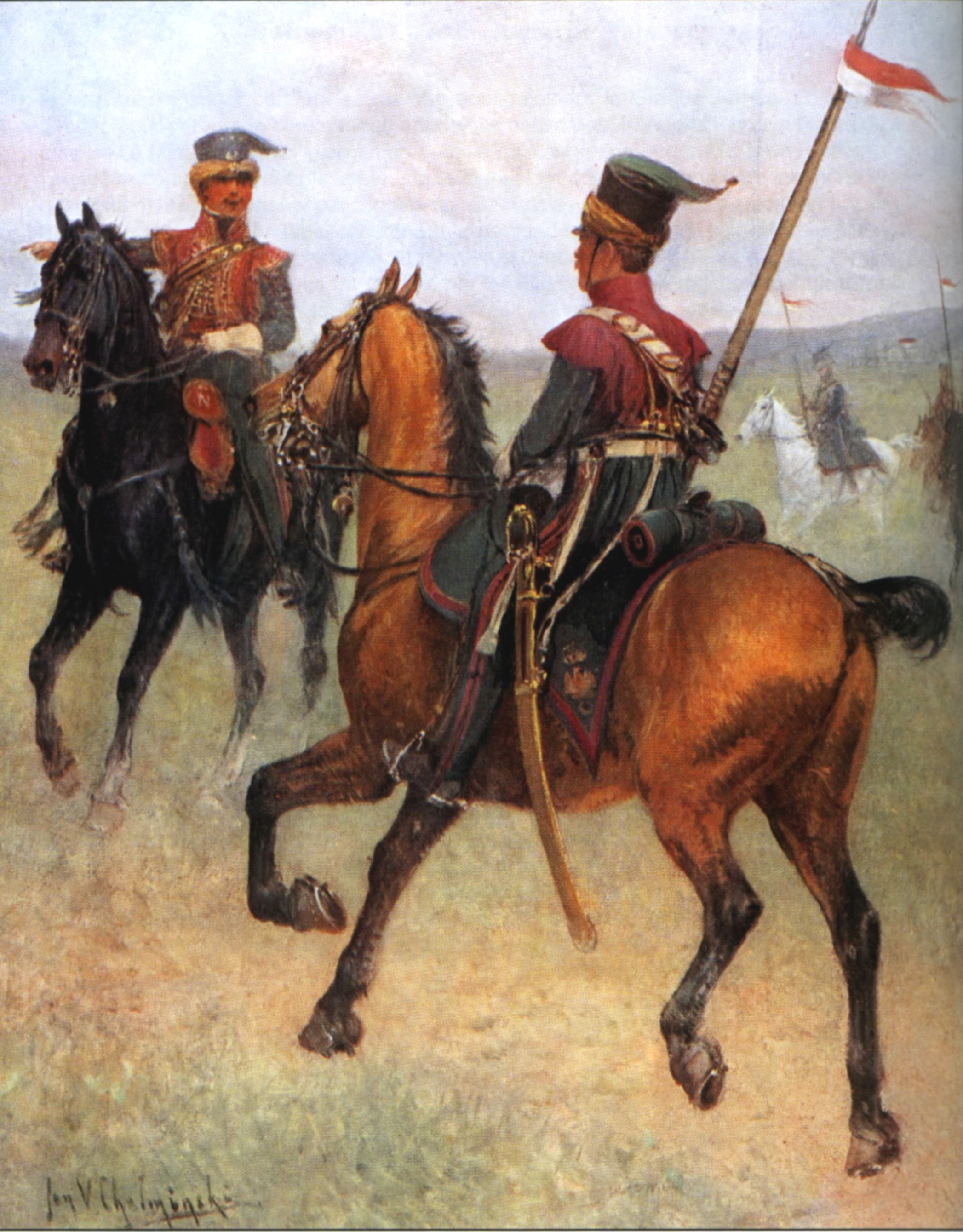
Lithuanian Tartars in service of the French with Red and White banners of Polish–Lithuanian Commonwealth

The squadron participated in the 1812 French invasion of Russia with the 6th Brigade of the Imperial Guard Cavalry (Elite Gendarmes, 3rd Lancers and Tatars). They suffered heavy losses during the invasion, particularly at Vilna from 10 to 12 December where Squadron Leader Achmatowicz was killed with 34 of his men. The Tatars also participated in the Battle of Kalish on 13 February 1813. The survivors were first incorporated into the remnants of the 3rd Lancers, which had nearly been destroyed at Slonim in October 1812, and then combined with the Polish Lancers of the Imperial Guard where they formed the 15th Company, considered as "Middle Guard". By this time, the Lithuanian Tatars were led by Captain Samuel Murza Ulan with lieutenants Ibrahim and Aslan Aley as seconds-in-command, with a total strength of only 53 men.

From April to June 1813, on the recommendations of Colonel-Major Dautancourt, the Captain Ulan tried to recruit new cavalrymen and left for France with maréchal des logis-chef Samuel Januszerwski. Reduced to just 47 men, he was refused foreign soldier reinforcements at Metz and went to Paris to seek support from Minister of War Henri Jacques Guillaume Clarke. Unsuccessful, Ulan and 24 recruits returned to Friedberg, Germany, the depot of Polish Lancers.

The Lithuanian Tatars continued to serve under Captain Ulan as part of the Polish Lancers during the 1813 German Campaign, participating in battles at Dresden, Peterswalde, Leipzig and Hanau. The Tatars were then transferred to the 3rd Polish Scouts Regiment of the Imperial Guard and saw further losses during the 1814 French Campaign, having 6 killed and 7 taken prisoner. After the abdication of Napoleon on 6 April, Ulan and the few survivors returned to Lithuania. According to Pigeard, 100 men of the initial 123 died by the end of the campaign.
