= Victor Huen =

French painter

Victor Huen (2 March 1874 – 15 December 1939) was a French painter, lithographer and illustrator, who specialized in military subjects and uniform illustrations. He was born in Colmar. He is most notable for his part in the series of uniform cards Les uniformes du Premier-Empire headed by commandant Louis-Eugène Bucquoy. Huen also collaborated with the illustrator Hansi on children's books.

== Works ==
- Les uniformes du Premier-Empire, 1904–1914, collaboration
- L'histoire d'Alsace : racontée aux petits enfants d'Alsace et de France, 1915, with Hansi
- La merveilleuse histoire du bon Saint Florentin d'Alsace par l'oncle Hansi, 1925, with Hansi
