= Job (illustrator) =

French artist and illustrator

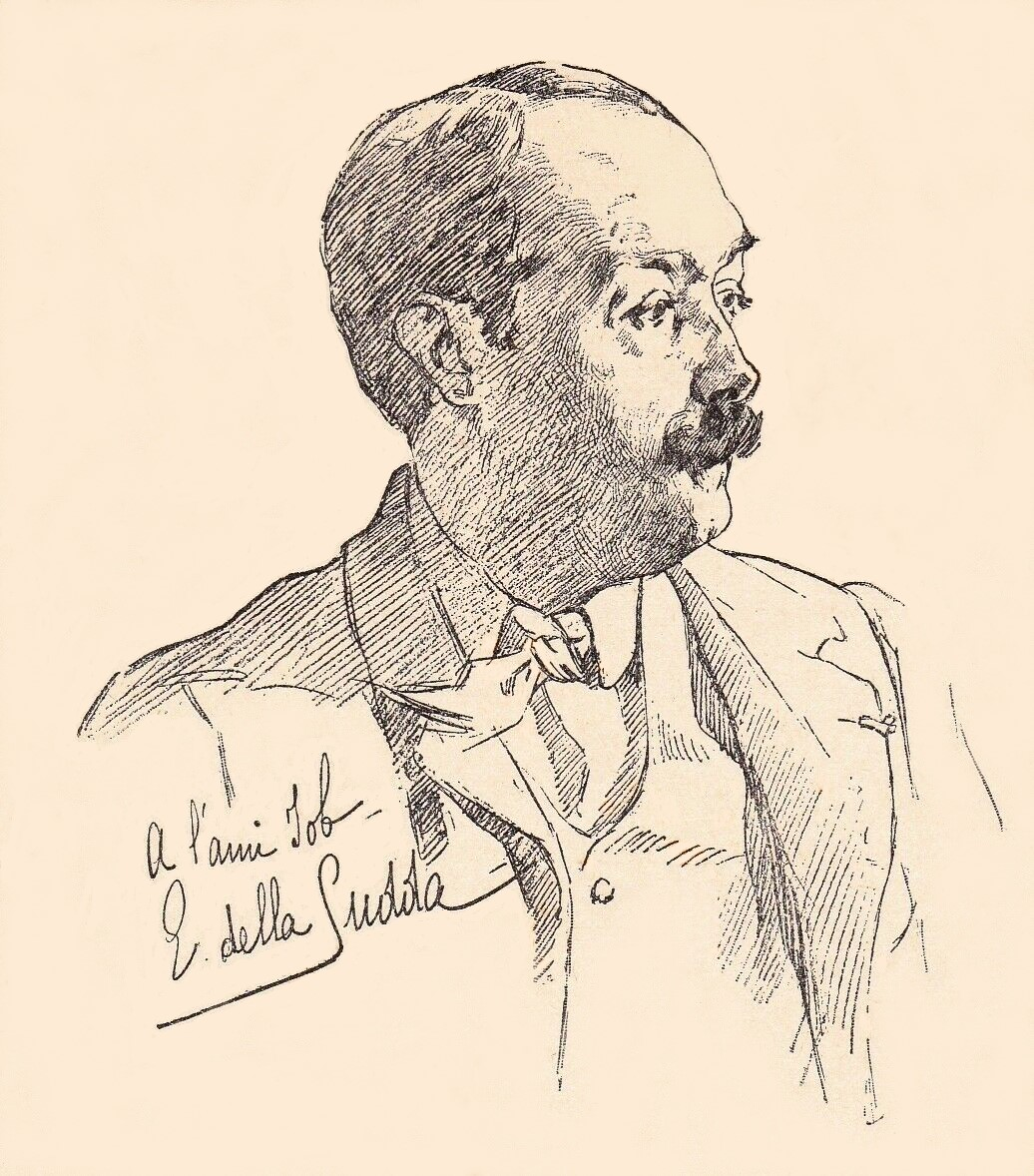
Job

Jacques Marie Gaston Onfroy de Bréville, known by the pen name Job after his initials (25 November 1858, Bar-le-Duc – 15 September 1931, Neuilly-sur-Seine) was a French artist and illustrator.

== Life ==
His father opposed his entry to thé École des beaux-arts after graduating from the Collège Stanislas. He therefore joined the French army, but returned to Paris in 1882. In the intervening period, he maintained a keen taste for military, patriotic and nationalistic subjects. He finally joined the École des beaux-arts and exhibited at the 1886 'Salon des artistes français', receiving a mixed reception. He therefore began a career as an illustrator, contributing caricatures to La Caricature and to La Lune.

However, he is best known for his illustrations for children's books, most frequently for texts by Georges Montorgueil. His major colour compositions contributed to the cult of 'heroes of the nation' such as Napoleon I and Joachim Murat. Several of his illustrations appear in La Vieille Garde impériale (The Old Imperial Guard), published in 1932 by Alfred Mame and fils de Tours. His eye for detail can be seen in L'Épopée du costume militaire français - even in works intended for children, he tried to reproduce uniforms with extreme precision.

His best known works are Murat, Le Grand Napoléon des petits enfants, Jouons à l'histoire, Louis XI, Napoléon, Bonaparte and Les Gourmandises de Charlotte. He also illustrated the life of George Washington and was well known in the USA. He was a Sociétaire of the 'humoristes' and exhibited with the Incoherents. His studio has been reconstructed at the musée de Metz.

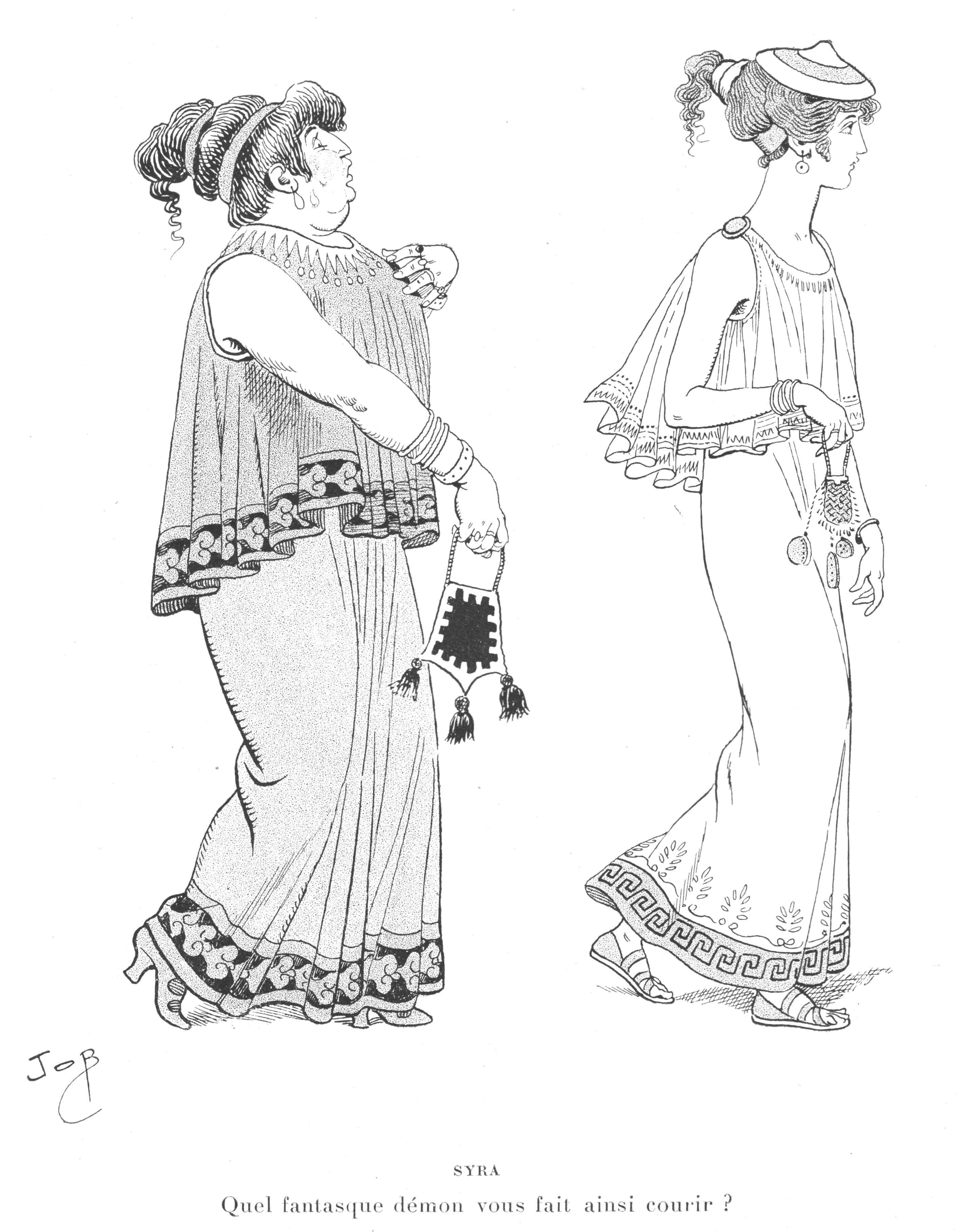

== Honours ==
Jacques Onfroy de Bréville was a Chevalier de la Légion d'honneur.

== Publications ==
- Histoire d'un bonnet à poil (text by J. de Marthold), gr. in-8°, Librairie d'Education de la Jeunesse, 1888;
- Jean la Poudre et Flamberge au vent (text by Henry de Brisay), gr. in-8°, Librairie d'Education de la Jeunesse, 1889;
- Les Gourmandises de Charlotte (text by J. Samary), Hachette, 1890;
- Le Grand Napoléon des Petits Enfans (text by J. de Marthold), gr. in-4°, Plon, 1893;
- Le Bon Roy Henry (text by J. Hermant) Mame, 1894;
- Le Tambour-Major Flambardin (text by J. Lemaire) Delagrave 1894;
- Mémoires de César Chabrac, trompette de Houzars and les Épées de France (text and drawings by Job) Geffroy, 1893 et 1894;
- Trois héros (text by A. Giron) Hachette, 1894;
- France, son histoire (text by Georges Montorgueil) Boivin, 1895;
- Les Mots historiques du pays de France (text by E. Trogan) Mame, 1896;
- Les Marins de la Garde (text by J. Lemaire) Delagrave 1896;
- La Cantinière (text by G. Montorgueil) Charavay, Mantoux, Martin, 1898;
- L’Épopée de l'Uniforme (text by H. Bouchot); Henri May, 1898;
- Les trois Couleurs (text by G. Montorgueil) Martin, 1899;
- A la pointe de l'Epée (text by J. Lemaire) Mame, 1899;
- Tenues des troupes de France (text by members of the Sabretache).
- La Tour d'Auvergne, premier grenadier de France (text by G. Montorgueil) Boivin, 1902;
- Liline et Frérot au pays des joujoux (text by G. Montorgueil) Boivin, 1903;
- Murat (text by G. Montorgueil) Hachette, 1903;
- Louis XI (text by G. Montorgueil) Furne, 1905;
- Jouons à l'histoire (text by G. Montorgueil) Boivin, 1908;
- Bonaparte (text by G. Montorgueil) Boivin, 1908;
- Au Pays des chansons (text by G. Montorgueil) Boivin, 1912;
- Ce bon Monsieur de Véragues (text by M. Maindron) Mame, 1912;
- A la Gloire des Bêtes (text by A. Fabre) Mame, 1912;
- Quand nos Rois étaient petits (text by C. Clerc et N. Sevestre) Delagrave, 1914;
- Washington, the man of action (text by Frederick Trevor Hill) Appleton, 1914;
- Allons Enfants de la Patrie! (text by Jean Richepin) Mame, 1920;
- Napoléon (text by G. Montorgueil) Boivin, 1921
- ABC, Petits contes (text by J. Lemaître) Mame, 1921;
- Kildine, histoire d'une méchante petite Princesse (text by Marie, Reine de Roumanie) Mame, 1921;
- Tambour battant! Mémoires d'un vieux Tambour (text by L. Sonolet) Mame, 1922;
- La Vieille Garde impériale (collaborative text) Mame, 1921;
- Voyages de Gulliver (text by Swift) Delagrave, 1927;
- Petite Histoire de France (text by J. Bainville) Mame, 1928;
- Quand le grand Napoléon était petit (text by E. Hinzelin) Delagrave, 1931;
- Chevalerie (text by J. Bédier) Mame, 1931;

== Bibliography ==
- Jean-Marie Embs et Philippe Melot, Le Siècle d’or du livre d’enfants et de jeunesse (1840–1940), Les Éditions de l’amateur, 2000. ISBN 978-2859172794
- Émile Hinzelin, Quand nos grands écrivains étaient petits, illustrations by Job, Librairie Delagrave, Paris, 1929.
- Laura Noesser, « Les Albums historiques », La Revue des livres pour enfants, 1985.
- François Robichon, Job ou l'histoire illustrée, Hersher, 1984.
