= Alexander Lanskoy =

Russian general, favourite of Catherine II (1758–1784)

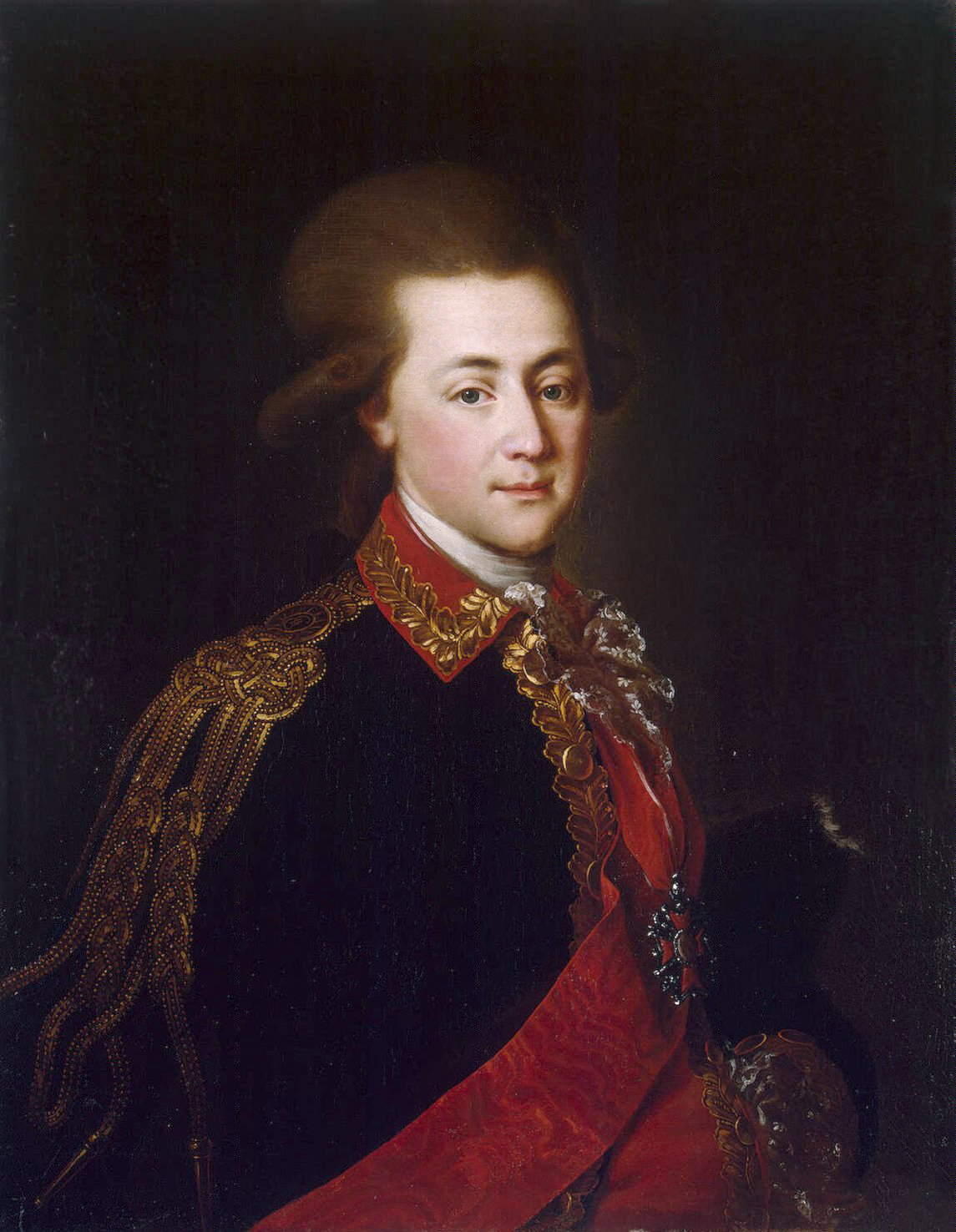
Portrait of Alexander Lanskoi by Anonymous (1783 or 1784).

Alexander Dmitrievich Lanskoy, (Note: Russian: Александр Дмитриевич Ланской, romanized: Aleksander Dmitrijevitj Lanskoj) (Note: Alternatively romanized as Lanskoi.) also called Sashin'ka (Note: Alternatively romanized as Sasjenka or Sashenka. It is "an affectionate diminutive of Alexander.") or Sasha, (19 March [O.S. 8 March] 1758 – 6 July [O.S. 25 June] 1784) was a Russian general, favourite and lover of Catherine the Great between 1780 and 1784. It has been said that "[a] look at [her] correspondence with her favorites gives the impression she only had tender feelings for one, Alexander Lanskoi."

== Biography ==
=== Family ===
Lanskoy was born to "a Smolensk military officer" in "an impecunious family of the provincial nobility", where he received a modest education and later became a Horse Guards officer. Sarah Jaques notes that "Lanskoy had grown up at court as a playmate and schoolmate of Catherine's children—Grand Duke Paul and Alexei Bobrinsky, her son with Gregory Orlov." Lanskoy's family, "for his position inevitably brought them great benefits too" and have been described as "greedy," were showered with gifts, all with Grigory Potemkin's approval. Lanskoy's male relatives, which consisted of "his cousins Stepan and Paul, were [promoted] to ensign rank in the Preobrazhensky Guards" with Potemkin's approval, while his sisters, Elizaveta, Advot'ia and Varvara, the first of which was given a house at Saint Petersburg, were appointed maids of honor, married high-ranking husbands at ceremonies in court and later "became ladies-of-the-bedchamber." Though, Jaques notes that, "[Catherine's] largesse failed to win over his disapproving family who considered the couple's age disparity scandalous." Vasily Lanskoy, a contemporary statesman four years older than Lanskoy, has been erroneously identified as his brother, however he was his cousin, as his only male sibling was Yakov Dmitrievich, who was older than him. Sergey Stepanovich Lanskoy, who served as Russia's Minister of the Interior between 1855 and 1861, was an extended relative. It has been speculated that Petr Lavinskii (1776–1844), a governor general of Eastern Sibera, may have been his nephew through one of his five sisters. Additionally, Lanskoy's cousin, Vasily Lanskoy, was appointed president of the Provisional Highest Council, a temporary government, of the Duchy of Warsaw in 1813, while Vasily's brother, Dmitrii, served as governor of Vilno between 1802 and 1804. Another nephew, Alexander Chernyshyov, born in 1785 to his sister, Evdokiia Dmitrievna Lanskaia, served as Minister of War and in other high ranking positions. For her part, his niece, Varvara Yakovlevna Lanskaya, married Paisi Kaysarov.

=== Introduction to Catherine ===
At age 22, (Note: Sebag Montefiore states that they started a relationship "[o]nly twenty to Catherine's fifty-one."") Lanskoy had requested his transfer to a provincial garrison since he "lacked sufficient funds to keep pace with his brother officers" and doing so would entail lower expenses. However, "[h]is application was rejected at the College of War by [Grigory] Potemkin himself, who then, surprisingly, appointed the young man his personal aide-de-camp." James Harris, the British ambassador, claims Potemkin had another candidate, yet Potemkin supported the choice of Lanskoy. It was Potemkin, who benefitted from Catherine's stable relationship with Lanskoy by having more time to annex Crimea and build the Black Sea Fleet, who introduced Lanskoy to Catherine on Easter 1780, (Note: Another story purports that he was introduced to Catherine by the Chief of Police, P. I. Tolstoy. Catherine apparently paid attention to him, but he did not become a favourite then. It was not until Vasily Ivanovich Levashov, an alleged favourite himself who filled in between Rimsky-Korsakov and Lanskoy during the month of October 1779 and himself uncle to Lanskoy's successor, Alexander Yermolov, turned to Potemkin for help that Lanskoy would become the favourite. To do this, Potemkin made him his aide-de-camp and supervised his court education for the following six months. In April 1780, Potemkin allegedly recommended Lanskoy as "a heartfelt friend.") six months after her latest favourite, Ivan Rimsky-Korsakov, had left with Princess Anna Trubetskaya. However, Massie states that Lanskoy was officially installed in the favourite apartments "[i]n November 1779".

After undergoing "a doctor's check and an evening with her new eprouveuse [tester of male capacity], Anna Protasova," and being thirty years her junior, he became Catherine's favorite. However, Simon Sebag Montefiore, places this in doubt, save for the medical inspection. His tenure as favourite caused "[t]he parade [of favorites to] slow slightly" until his death, becoming the only one to serve till death, (Note: Potemkin, who died in 1791, might also be considered another contender for the distinction of serving till his death, however, he was Catherine's lover consecutively until 1776.) and the longest tenure since Orlov. Virginia Rounding calls him "one of the most successful [choices] Catherine ever made," and mentions that "he seemed to love and respect the Empress as much as she loved him." Robert K. Massie considers him to be one of the five favourites, including the lovers she had as Grand Duchess, whom she loved. (Note: The other four, whom all preceded Lanskoy were Poniatowsky, Orlov, Potemkin and Zavadovsky.) Massie expands that "his devotion to Catherine was based on her role as his teacher as much as her position as empress." Catriona Kelly has described Catherine as "nudging her lover...into cultivated pursuits." As with most of her favorites, Lanskoy was beneficiary of her "strongly pedagogical streak in seeking to cultivate promising young noblemen of mediocre background," which Lanskoy responded wholeheartedly to." Sebag Montefiore called him "Catherine's ideal pupil and companion [even though he] was not highly educated but [was] keen to learn." However, Marie Daniel Bourrée, Baron de Corberon, the French chargé d'affaires in Russia, wrote in September 1780, "'[h]e has just been bought [by Catherine] a library for 10,000 roubles, which he certainly will not read.'"

=== As Catherine's favourite ===
Unlike other favourites, Lanskoy did not, or at least attempted to not, involve himself in politics, did not accept bribes or ask for favors or gifts and shared her cultural interests. To cultivate and educate him, Catherine read works by Francesco Algarotti with Lanskoy, and "encouraged him to correspond in French with Baron Grimm," which she aided him in doing so. However, she also persuaded Lanskoy to educate himself culturally. Massie posits that, just as his successor Mamonov, Lanskoy was "one of the favourites "who showed interest in her intellectual and artistic pursuits [which made them] likely to last longer."

He was made a chamberlain and promoted to general, (Note: Sebag Montefiore, as do other sources, state that he was made a lieutenant-general.) received petitions and accompanied her in travels. In May and June 1780, Lanskoy accompanied Catherine to Mogilev to meet Joseph II. He "began to wield great influence in court" and that same year, Jason Smogorzewski appealed fruitlessly to Lanskoy to intercede with Catherine to name a successor to the Ruthenian Catholic Archeparchy of Polotsk–Vitebsk.

In 1781, Andrei Shuvalov, Catherine Shuvalova's husband, told Lanskoy rumours that Shuvalov himself had been spreading that Catherine would replace him with Pavel Dashkov, Yekaterina Vorontsova-Dashkova's son, who was her closest female friend, causing Lanskoy to turn against both Dashkova and her son. For her part "Dashkova was jealous, did not approve, and universally detested all of [Catherine's] favorites, especially...Orlov...Lanskoi, and...Zubov." When Catherine wrote to her son Paul and his wife when they both were travelling Western Europe between 1781 and 1782, she made no mention of Lanskoy being with her and her grandsons, even though he was present constantly.

In 1782, he and Potemkin collaborated to remove Count Orlov from court. The same year, Lanskoy's brother, Yakov, eloped with a foreign mistress, from Dresden to Paris, however, Catherine had him apprehended in Bar-le-Duc, and worked with Grimm and Frédéric-César de La Harpe, the future tutor to Catherine's grandson, to return him to Russia. On August 31, 1782, Lanskoy accompanied Catherine, Potemkin and Anna Protasova en route to visit a sick Ivan Betskoy and stopped at the recently unveiled Bronze Horseman. Later that December, both Lanskoy and Catherine were sick themselves "[having] come down with nasty colds," however, they received the recently elected Marshal of the Nobility of Moscow, Pyotr Sheremetev, and with Potemkin "and a handful [of other] of the empress's intimates [sat] up till late in the evening playing cards, chatting, and reminiscing about the old days." During June 1783 Lanskoy was part of Catherine's retinue that left Tsarskoye Selo when she travelled to and held a three-day negotiation with Gustav III at Frederikshamn. In mid-1783 he intervened twice in Samuel Bentham's courting of Countess Sophia Matushkina, Alexander Mikhailovich Golitsyn's niece, which Golitsyn's forbidding of was a scandal, even though both Lanskoy and Catherine encouraged the relationship at first. On the initial occasion, which might have been at Catherine's prompting, Lanskoy tried unsuccessfully to persuade Golitsyn's wife and Sophia's mother on Bentham's behalf by explaining that "the Empress thought they did wrong to oppose the young Countess's inclinations." However, Catherine, who had been aided in taking the throne by Golitsyn and who was one of her closest confidants, eventually ordered Lanskoy to intervene a second time to terminate the relationship. In April 1783, upon hearing of the death of Grigory Orlov, whom she had taken care of after his descent into insanity following the death of his wife, she commented on Lanskoy's support that "'[he] is tearing himself apart to help me bear my grief, but that makes me melt even more.'" However, during "Catherine's care and concern for [Orlov], and the time she was prepared to devote to him, appear[ed] to have offended both Potemkin and Lanskoy, who took to their beds in high dudgeon."

=== Illnesses and death ===
Between July and August 1783, he suffered a fall from a horse, "an English animal that had already kicked him once before," which caused him to be ill for six weeks. Catherine described his convalescence to Grimm, informing him that it "put him in bed for several days, but from which he is completely recovered, although his chest was bruised and he was spitting blood, but thanks to his excellent constitution, he doesn't seem to feel it anymore." This coincided with the illness of another friend, Alexander Mihkhailovich Golitsyn, and the birth of her first granddaughter, Grand Duchess Alexandra Pavlovna of Russia, the combination of which she considered a bad omen. Catherine always worried about his health and would take leave of governmental duties whenever this occurred. This also carried itself onto other's actions, as Potemkin, who was forced to "[delay] his final orders to Suvorov" to develop a Russian presence in Persia, nonetheless, it was cut back and a smaller expedition sent later on. Between 1780 and 1781, James Harris, the British ambassador, wished to strengthen Anglo-Russian relations, with George III having written a personal letter to her to arrange an alliance between the two nations, however Potemkin had to explain to Harris ""[y]ou have chosen an unlucky moment. The favorite [Lanskoy] lies dangerously ill; the cause of his illness and the uncertainty of recovery have so entirely unhinged the empress that she is incapable of employing her thoughts on any subject, and all ideas of ambition, of glory, of dignity, are absorbed in this one passion. Exhausted, she avoids everything involving activity or exertion."" By March 1782, Harris thought that Lanskoy would not last as favorite, and would be removed, taking as evidence the purchase of a house for him and "the preparation of the usual magnificent leave-taking presents", however, this did not come to be, as it was Catherine's wish that the relationship continue until her death.

She did not tell the details of the event, "her souffre-douleur" as Rounding called it, to Grimm until 14 of September, three months after the event. On Wednesday, 19 June, Lanskoy came down with a sore throat and "[o]n that day he came to me the moment his throat began to hurt him, and he told me that he was about to have a severe illness from which he would not recover I tried to banish this idea from his head..."

On Tuesday, 6 July [O.S. 25 June] 1784, at the age of twenty-six (Note: Dixon mentions that he died at "[n]ot yet twenty-six," while Pollock considers him "Catherine's twenty-six-year-old favorite.") and holding the rank of lieutenant general, Lanskoy died unexpectedly at Tsarkoye Selo with Catherine beside him. His death was caused by diphtheria, but rumors claimed his health had been weakened by aphrodisiacs. These, some of which were noted by John Parkinson after a dinner in 1792, alleged he died "in place", "his legs had dropped off" after death and was poisoned or that was actually assassinated because he represented a threat to Potemkin. Additionally, Rounding considers that his delirious request that horses be harnessed to his bed couple with his alleged use of aphrodisiacs, contributed to rumours of Catherine's own death. Dashkova, who derided Catherine's favorites, stated of his death that "[he] ... quite literally burst — his belly burst." Dr. John Rogerson, Catherine's personal physician and the man who bled Golitsyn probably to death in his final illness, "was called in too late" to treat Lanskoy, having given him Dr. Robert James's fever powder the day before his death, (Note: It has also been rumoured that Lasnkoy was victim to being "murdered by the [doctor] caring for [him].") however he did aid Catherine in overcoming her subsequent depression. Catherine grieved by "[taking] refuge in her apartments, disappearing from public view for months, until she emerged, with Prince Potemkin's help, in September," during which time government activity had ceased. As soon as Lanskoy had died, Bezbordko and Rogeron sent out for Potemkin, who made the journey from Crimea back in seven days, arriving on 10 July. Though, Rounding points out that "[s]he nevertheless continued to carry out the most urgent business of the Empire, giving the necessary orders when required." Alexander Vorontsov, "who had no connection with Lanskoy [regretted] his passing when [he] learned of its impact on Catherine [writing to his brother, Semyon Vorontsov] 'The preservation of the empress is too interesting to us all.'" Rounding considers that his death was the "first time in her life, [she] was incapacitated by grief," while Sebag Montefiore states that "[h]er courtiers had never seen her in such a state." Lanskoy's death has been considered the climax "[of her] sense of loss, [which was] growing steadily with the process of aging, [and] her feeling of existential insecurity and abandonement [sic]." This was made worse by the fact that during the previous winter her beloved Greyhound, Sir Tom Anderson, died succeeded by Grimm's mistress, Louise d'Épinay, who died at the beginning of the year, and Adam Olsufiev, her State Secretary, who followed two days after Lanskoy, which caused her to be "close to despair for almost a year." However, "[s]he personally wrote [to Lanskoy's] mother the day after his death." When she received the letter of condolence, Lanskoy's mother went to see Catherine, nevertheless, she was attended by a lady-in-waiting, as Catherine shunned every visitor after Lanskoy's death. The first three weeks of her grieving, she did not leave her bed, and after that she did not go out, nor were there any entertainments. She was not seen for a month and a half by the court or in public, only Bezborodko and Potemkin, whose initial sympathy was perceived initially as insulting by Catherine, at the beginning, and then by Fyodor Orlov. She "continually [asked] about her lover's body, perhaps hoping his death would prove a lie."

==== Burial ====
There is a discrepancy as to when he was buried, since it is alleged his corpse "was left to rot in the heat of the summer because Catherine could not bear to see it buried for more than a month." However, Dixon, as Virginia Rounding noted in a review, "differs from some previous accounts...in giving an earlier date for the funeral." Dixon mentions that Lanskoy's corpse was taken from "Tsarskoye Selo to the house Quarenghi had designed for him in Sofia." Then the body was taken "'with due honour' to [Charles] Cameron's new cathedral on the morning of Thursday[,] 27 June and immediately interred in the neighbouring cemetery following a funeral service [which Catherine did not attend] conducted by Metropolitan Gavriil." There was an additional rumour that the pallbearers died as a consequence of the stench, however, Sebag Montefiore gives credit to Dashkova's allegations of belly bursting since "unburied corpses do tend to swell in the heat." However, the 27 June date is based on Dixon's allegation that a letter that Bezborodko wrote to Potemkin, where he "[reported] that the funeral took place 'yesterday', is misdated 28 July 1784. The letter's contents, and the collateral evidence [in Kamer-fur'erskie zhurnaly, 1696–1816, a type of chamberlain's journal compiled by Sergeĭ Aleksandrovich Sobolevskiĭ], place it at 28 June." In his introduction, Dixon mentions that "[c]orrections to generally accepted dates are largely silent, except where they significantly revise our understanding of the course of events" which included not only Lanskoy's funerals but Empress Elizabeth's as well. Another author whom gives a different date for Lanskoy's death is E. F. Petinova, however, John T. Alexander considers it part of a series of "slips in dates" from Petinova's part.

=== Posthumous events ===
Catherine left Tsasrkoye Selo on 5 September, however, her grief prevented her from staying at her apartments, wishing to reside at the Hermitage. Following his death she had Karl Leberecht, her court medalist, design and engrave the 'On the Death of General Alexander Lanskoy' medal struck, which was a silver medal with a "reddish-golden patina" bearing his wigged likeness facing left on the obverse and on the reverse "[f]our trees surrounding a memorial obelisk [with the inscription "From Catherine, to friendship]," with [his] birth...and death date below." Additionally, Catherine had a plaque, with Lanskoy's gilded coat of arms above, an inscription that read "What great pleasure for noble souls to see virtue and merit crowned by praise form all", and "a large version of Lebrecht's medal" at the bottom added to an already existing monument on the grounds of the Catherine Park in Tsarkoye Selo, which though originally intended as "an allegory "of virtues and merits" unconnected with any particular person", nonetheless came to be identified with Lanskoy as time progressed. However, Jaques asserts that Cameron erected the monument, and for his part Massie states that the monument reads "From Catherine to my dearest friend", however, this might be part of the medal, or a replacement text after the plaque disappeared during the World War II. Catherine had stated in "an undated will in her own hand," that if she died at Tsarskoye Selo she wished to be interred by Lanskoy's side at the cemetery at Sofia.

On the occasion of his death, Catherine wrote, in a letter "too personal to have been written by a secretary" and which has been considered "a masterpiece, a truly pre-romantic expression of existential void and pessimism", to Friedrich Melchior, Baron von Grimm, "who knew Lanskoy well, [and had] remained in his good graces":

When I began this letter, I was living in happiness and joy, and my days passed so quickly that I knew not what became of them. It is no longer so: I have been plunged into the acutest pain, and my happiness is no more. I thought that I myself would die from the irreparable loss I suffered only a week ago – that of my best friend. I had hoped that he would become the helpmeet of my old age. He worked hard and benefited from it. He had come to share all my tastes. He was a young man whom I was cultivating; who was grateful, gentle, and honest; who shared my woes when I had them and rejoiced at my joys. In a word, I have the misfortune of telling you, through my sobbing, that General Lanskoy is no more. A malignant fever, joined with the quinsy, carried him off in five days to his grave, and my chambers, formerly so pleasant to me, have become a vacant cavern in which I can scarcely even drift like a shadow. A sore throat and a raging fever overcame me on the eve of his death.

— Catherine the Great, 2 July 1784 Letter to Friedrich Melchior, Baron von Grimm

After Lanskoy's death, Catherine "immersed herself in work on her universal etymological dictionary," which would eventually be published in 1787 under the title Linguarum totius orbis vocabularia comparativa. To aid her in her grief, the private physician of George III in Hanover, Johann Georg Ritter von Zimmermann, whom Catherine had previously invited in vain to Russia, sent her his Solitude considered with respect to its influence upon the mind and the heart. Catherine's journey to Crimea was partly put in doubt by Lanskoy's death, however, it was postponed and eventually carried out in 1787.

The position of favourite was vacant for a whole year after his death, until Potemkin nominated Alexander Yermolov, who also happened to be a Horse Guard and an aide-de-camp to Potemkin. However, he was uninterested in politics and did not have the same cultural passion of Lanskoy, which was to his, Potemkin's and Catherine's benefit. After Yermolov tried to orchestrate Potemkin's downfall, and brought about his own because of it, Catherine replaced him with "someone she believed was another Lanskoy[,] Alexander Mamonov." However, he did not provide the same care as Lanskoy and carried out a clandestine affair and impregnated Princess Darya Scherbatova.

As with all her favorites, she gifted him vast amounts of land and money, the latter amounting to an alleged "tune of several million rubles." Catherine also granted him the title of "count". Her first gift consisted of "jewels, a hundred thousand rubles, and a country estate." Jaques concludes that the gifts "include[d] two houses in St. Petersburg, a house at Tsarskoe Selo, and 80,000 rubles' worth of buttons for his ceremonial caftan." She had Giacomo Quarenghi, her court architect, "[design] a house for him at Sofia [and work] on a grandiose palace at Velë [where Quarenghi also had to "design a great staircase and many internal decorations"], the estate Catherine had bought for him in Pskov province" and had her gardener, the Scotsman James Meader, go "there to plan the park." Nevertheless, he willed the whole of his fortune that he had acquired as favorite "which included artworks and library to Catherine", who "divided [it] equally between his mother, brother, and five sisters." Nonetheless, Catherine kept Lanskoy's books, which she had aided him directly in amassing and were on art history, and added them to the Hermitage Library.

Of the gifts he received from Catherine one was a still extant table dessert service by Giuseppe Valadier. This "surtout de table," which she acquired, with Grimm's help, from Louis Auguste Le Tonnelier de Breteuil, is "[o]ver several feet in length, the surtout feature[s] Roman buildings and monuments in gilded bronze and gemstones." Jaques notes that Lanskoy possessed a "discerning eye and interest in art [proving] the perfect companion. He commenced "collecting books and miniatures copied from the imperial collection [and then added] gems, coins, and several dozen small bronzes, including Giambologna's Hercules and the Sacred Hind of Arcadia [after which a] print collection followed." The Giambologna, standing "just fifteen inches tall", was "a late Renaissance bronze statuette from...the Flemish-born sculptor's series of the twelve labors of Hercules." In 1784, Catherine made her last major art collection acquisition, that of Sylvain Raphaël, comte de Baudouin, as a gift to Lanskoy. This collection totalled "119 Flemish and Dutch pictures" of which "were nine [then identified as] Rembrandts, mainly portraits," one being the Portrait of Jeremias de Dekker and another Pallas Athene as well as six van Dycks. At one point Catherine wrote to Grimm that Lanskoy wished "a miniature copy of [the head of Greuze] in enamel [if Grimm procured it, which he eventually did] he will jump like a deer, and his already beautiful coloring will become still more vivid..."

Furthermore, they shared a passion for engraved gemstones, and apart from Alexander Dmitriev-Mamonov, he was the other of her favourites she would spend hours with "[poring] over her collection of carved jewels" and when Lanskoy died "she packed the trinkets away, heartbroken, and wrote to her dealer, who happened to be Grimm: "As for carved stones, tell those who offer them to you that I never bought them for myself, and... I will not buy any more. My grief is extreme, such as I have never felt..."" This only lasted a year though, as the next year "[Catherine] acquired Lanskoy's collection from his heirs, including his gems and casts." When informing Grimm of his fall from a horse, Catherine mentioned that "[w]hen...Lanskoy heard that you had let go of a collection of antique stones without buying them, he almost fainted, and was nearly suffocated by it." It is known that she gifted Lanskoy a cabinet with engraved gemstones by James Tassie, which was returned to her upon Lanskoy's death. However, it has not been determined without a shadow of a doubt whether a specific specimen in the Hermitage, probably designed by James Wyatt and made by Samuel Roach or Roake of London, is one and the same. Though Lanskoy did not live to see it, his promtping of Catherine "to use native stones from the Urals and Siberia for new gems" led to the establishment of grinding workshops "for cameo arts" at Yekaterinburg and Kolyvan.

In 1784, one of the first Neo-Gothic churches in Russia was built, the now-demolished St. Nicholas Church, in an estate gifted by Catherine to Lanskoy in Posadnikovo. It is possible the church was designed by Yury Felten, who as court architect was working on a building in St. Petersburg for Lanskoy. It was at this "[Felten]-designed residence on Palace Square facing the Winter Palace" that "Lanskoy displayed his new [collected] artworks." After Lanskoy's death, under Catherine's orders, "the splendid parquet floors from his St. Petersburg residence reinstalled in her new Agate Pavilion [not to be confused with the Amber Room] at Tsarskoe Selo."

Richard Brompton, portrait painter to Catherine, was commissioned a portrait of Lanskoy, however Brompton died before the work was finished. She wrote to Grimm "Brompton died and did not finish the portrait which he had begun. But you will see that the choice of Lanskoi was not bad though God knows where he got it from; he prowls around all the [artists'] studios every morning...." An anonymous portrait of Lanskoy was used to represent "[t]he parade of young officers who followed Potemkin" as Catherine's lovers in the Hermitage Rooms' inaugural exhibition Treasures of Catherine the Great. In 1786. Pyotr Sheremetev commissioned Ivan Argunov "to paint a portrait of his deceased friend Aleksandr Lanskoy using the most recent engraving of his likeness." Lanskoy's private collection was one of the earliest large, private art collections that "entered the Hermitage after the death of their owners," others of note being those owned by Potemkin and Grigory Teplov. Lanskoy's own brother, Yakov, commissioned a painting of the Last Judgement, where Lanskoy was portrayed "burning below in the fires of Gehenna," while the rest of the family was in heaven. Another relative of the couple, this time, Catherine's grandson, Nicholas I, removed the plaque from the Lanskoy monument because it was "too compromising for the dynasty", and had Lanskoy's portrait taken off the wall of the Hermitage, declaring "It has no place here!"

== Personality ==
Catherine considered that his "good humor...made Tsarskoe Selo 'into the most charming and pleasant of places where the days passed so quickly one did not know what had become of them.'" On another occasion she described him as "kind, gay, honest, and full of gentleness", and she used to "[call] him a knight." He was "strikingly handsome...[with] refined, gamin features" and a "very handsome young man" Sebag Montefiore called him "the companion she deserved", "her Holy Grail" and describes him as "the gentlest, sweetest and least ambitious of Catherine's favorites," which made her "truly happy at last."

Jaques describes him "beautifully mannered" and describes "Catherine [falling] head-over-heels for her good-natured lover." Rounding states that Catherine talked proudly of him, as a grandmother would, and used the plural we to refer to Lanskoy when describing him to Grimm:

'Oh,' [Orlov] said, 'you'll see what a man she'll make of him! he gobbles everything up.' He began by gobbling up the poets and the poems in one winter; several historians in another; novels bore us, but we gulp down the taste of Algarotti and friends. Without having been a student, we will have limitless knowledge, and we only enjoy ourselves in the company of all those who are of the highest quality and the most learned; in addition to that, we build and we plant, we are beneficent, cheerful, honest and very sweet.

— Catherine the Great, 29 June 1782 Letter to Grimm

Massie describes him as "[having] an elegant bearing and a sensitive face" and as an "ardent young student; [who] in [Catherine's] mind, no one could compete with [his] charm, brilliance, and devotion." Massie elaborates on Lanskoy as follows:

Lanskoy did not arouse in Catherine the passion she had for Orlov or Potemkin, but his gentleness and devotion inspired in her an almost maternal affection. He was intelligent and tactful; he refused to take any part in public affairs; he was artistic, had good taste, and was seriously interested in literature, painting, and architecture. He became an ideal companion, accompanying her to concerts and the theater, sitting quietly and listening as she talked, even helping her to design new gardens at Tsarskoe Selo.

— Robert K. Massie, Chapter 63 "The Favorites" in Catherine the Great: Portrait of a Woman

Alexander Bezborodko, described him as "not of good character," however, he did recognize him as "compared to the others, he was an angel. He had friends, did not try to harm his neighbors, and often he tried to help people." Massie considers that, contrary to contemporary rumours, Potemkin did not feel jealous of Lanskoy. However Lanskoy himself was prone to jealousy. After the Saint Petersburg Gazette, which was published by the Russian Academy of Sciences headed by Dashkova, reported that by name that Dashkova had accompanied Catherine on her June 1783 trip to Finland and omitted Lanskoy he "was first suspicious and then incensed by what he felt to be inaccurate and prejudiced reporting of [the] events." Another expression of his jealousy for Catherine was her gifting a bust of herself by Fedot Shubin (now at the Hermitage Museum) to Dashkova. Upon Lanskoy "[taking] offense, claiming the statue was his" Catherine ruled in Dashkova's favor, after which, according to Dashkova, he threw a furious glance at the victor. Another instance that might have grounds for a rift in the relationship comes from James Harris, who stated that in May 1781, Catherine had carried out an affair with Mordvinov, however, Potemkin stepped in and aided in the relationship. Harris recounts that Lanskoy's high tolerance for Catherine's flirting was "neither jealous, inconstant, nor impertinent and laments the disgrace...in so pathetic a manner" that he endeared himself even more to Catherine.

For his part, Simon Dixon portrays a somewhat different Lanskoy than Massie's, which is more in line with Dashkova's encounters, however Dixon agrees that Catherine had relationship unlike any since Orlov and she was more maternal towards Lanskoy:

"[He] certainly relished the trappings of office, strutting about at Court 'dressed most magnificently with a shoulder knot of fine brilliant diamonds'. True to form, he 'leapt like a hind' when he learned that Gustav III planned to invest him with the Grand Cross of the Order of the Polar Star. To Catherine, however, the dashing young Sashinka was no mere trinket. Her relationship with him was the closest she came to repeating her experience with Grigory Orlov, except that Lanskoy lacked Orlov's streak of ruthless courage and both she and Potëmkin always treated him like a child in a gilded cage."

— Simon Dixon, Chapter 10 "The search for emotional stability 1776–1784" in Catherine the Great

Dixon goes on, comparing life with Potemkin versus Lanskoy "– life with Sasha Lanskoy must have seemed reassuringly undemanding. It was certainly less competitive." Sebag Montefiore, agrees with Dixon, identifying that Lanskoy had a "taste for splendor," was "calm and good-natured" and that "[he] was the best of the minions because he truly adored her and she him."

For her part, Rounding describes him in a manner combining both Massie and Dixon's portrayals:

Though by all accounts Alexander Lanskoy was not particularly distinguished or gifted, he made the ideal companion for Catherine at this time [early 1780s], for he was eminently teachable – keen to learn and able to absorb information and what one might term "cultivation' very quickly...He undoubtedly brought her much happiness and stability. He also seemed happy to accept Potemkin's place at the centre of Catherine's life and as a kind of father-figure in relation to himself.

— Virginia Rounding, Chapter 15 "The Empress and the Emperor (1779–81)" in Catherine the Great: Love, Sex and Power

Lanskoy seems to have understood his role "as the junior member of the triad" as evidenced by Catherine, who wrote to Potemkin, "I enclose a little note from someone who is extremely attached to you, and longs for you cruelly." Sebag Montefiore labelled him "the favourite who was happiest to join the broader Catherine-Potemkin family." He would call Potemkin a "father" or "dear uncle", would express the dullness he felt without Potemkin and urged him to "come as soon as possible." For his part, Potemkin would answer him with "kind notes and oranges." This relationship included Potemkin's nieces, which Lanskoy treated with utmost kindness and reported to Potemkin health events, from pregnancies to fevers, that afflicted Catherine, himself or the nieces. Lanskoy's successor, Mamonov, would also carry on this tradition. The only time Lanskoy was cause for Potemkin's ire occurred on April 1780, when Potemkin was planning Catherine's meeting with Joseph II at Mogilev. Lanskoy wrote to Catherine that Potemkin's "soul is full of anxiety." Catherine wrote to Potemkin using "we" to refer to herself and at times, singularly Lanskoy, ending the letter with "[o]ur only sorrow concerns you, that you're anxious." Potemkin's outburst caused Lanskoy to seek Catherine, who thought Lanskoy had irritated Potemkin and wrote "[p]lease let me know if [he] annoyed you somehow and if you are angry with him and why exactly." Another supposed intrigue was the false allegation that Potemkin was the cause of a plague outbreak in 1783, in which "even Lanskoy [was] somehow involved," however there were no grounds to link him. Ludwig von Cobenzl, the Austrian ambassador to Russia, had reassured Joseph II on their meeting with Catherine, accompanied with Lanskoy, at Mogilev, that Lanskoy "is 'that species of favourite, who are frequently subject to change, have no influence on affairs, and who limit themselves to making their fortune and that of all those who belong to them'." Another ambassador, James Harris, said of him "[h]e is neither jealous, inconstant nor overbearing; and even when he cannot be ignorant of his approaching fall, he preserves the same placid unexceptionable temper."

He is alleged to have "used stimulants to increase his sexual prowess." Lanskoy trained Theseus Tom, one of the greyhounds Catherine kept in her room. Even so, "the training seems to have been only partially successful, as Theseus had a tendency to nip the leg of anyone who tried to share the hearth with him", with the exception of Alexander and Constantine.

== In popular culture ==
Alexander Sergeyevich Stroganov, a contemporary Russian courtier and collector just like Catherine and Lanskoy, authored The Morning of the Curiosity Lover, a direct critique at obsessive collecting portrayed by a Count in the Hermitage.

A French translation by Petr Bugdanov of Matthew Guthrie's first published work, On the Anti-septic Regimen of the Natives of Russia, part of a letter to Joseph Priestley, published in 1784, was dedicated to Lanskoy.

John Parkinson, an Oxford don and clergyman, made a Grand Tour of Europe which he memorialized in A Tour of Russia, Siberia and the Crimea, 1792–1794 (published 1971) where he included a "Note on Lanskoy," after a dinner in 1792, mentioning the several rumours that abounded even in Catherine's late-reign on her sexual life and Lanskoy's death.

Lord Byron compared Don Juan in his eponymous work (1824), who himself became a favorite of Catherine, to Lanskoy and arrives after she "had just buried the fair-faced Lanskoi," and is said to resemble him. Byron's narrative voice also points out that "most of Catherine's innumerable lovers, with the exception of...Lanskoi, her favorite, were "mostly nervous six-foot fellows."" This work, and especially Don Juan as a favourite, "is unmistakably related to" the character of Vladimir Lensky in Alexander Pushkin's novel in verse Eugene Onegin.

Don Juan

- Of Sentiment; and he she most adored
- Was the lamented Lanskoi, who was such
- A Lover as had cost her many a tear,
- And yet but made a middling Grenadier.

— Lord Byron, Canto the Ninth of Don Juan

In Tomoyoshi Murayama's puppet play A Nero in skirts (1927) a character by the name of Semyon Mikhailowitsch Lanskoi (Note: The first name probably inspired by another of Catherine's lovers, Semyon Zorich.) is a "flag bearer of the Simbirsk regiment, [who is later promoted to] captain" and is forced to become Catherine's favourite. He is sent to the battlefield, yet returns to the court dressed as a peasant due to the horrors of war. As the penalty for desertion is death, she puts him in prison and orders he be executed. However, Catherine informs him that it will all be staged, nonetheless he ends up beheaded under the czarina's orders, unbeknownst to him that she had lied to him.

Jayne Meadows, playing Catherine in the first part of a two-part episode, which aired as the Episode 5 of Season 4 (1981), of her husband's show Meeting of the Minds, commented in character, "Oh yes, Zavadovskii. Wonderful legs ... and Lanskoi, and one who got away, what was his name?—oh, yes, Ermolov, and Zorich and Mamonov, who died so young, Rimskii and my darling Zubov— dear Zubey—."

In Andreï Makine's novel A Woman Loved (2013), traces the journey that his protagonist, Russian screenwriter Oleg Erdman, embarks upon to produce a film based on Catherine's life. Erdman believes he has "[found] the soul of his subject" in her relationship with Lanskoy which "is the key to understanding the "hidden side to her that people try to obliterate.""

Ivan Korsak describes a fictional Lanskoy in his novel-essay The Last Lover of the Empress as "[f]air[,] husky with clumsy manners and modesty of a teenage girl."

Leo Tolstoy's unfinished short story Posthumous notes of the hermit Fedor Kuzmích (1905), gives a fictional account of an entry from Feodor Kuzmich's diary, purporting the disaccredited legend that Alexander I faked his own death and continued to live as a hermit. In it, the fictitious Alexander comments on his grandmother's lover:

He was always with her and everybody noticed him and paid court to him. My grandmother especially looked back at him continually. Of course I did not then understand what it meant, and Lanskóy pleased me very much. I liked his curls, his handsome thighs in tightly stretched elk-skin breeches, his well-shaped calves, his merry careless smile, and the diamonds that glittered all over him.

— Leo Tolstoy, Posthumous notes of the hermit Fedor Kuzmích

== Honours ==
=== Domestic ===
Knight of the Order of St. Alexander Nevsky

Order of Saint Stanislaus

=== Foreign ===
1783: Commander Grand Cross of the Order of the Polar Star

== Sources ==
- Alexander, John T. (1988). Catherine the Great : Life and Legend. Oxford University Press. ISBN 9780199874309. ProQuest 2131422530. Archived from the original on 4 December 2024.
- Dianina, Katia (October 2004). "Art and Authority: The Hermitage of Catherine the Great". The Russian Review. 63 (4). Wiley-Blackwell: 630–54. doi:10.1111/j.1467-9434.2004.00337.x. ISSN 0036-0341. JSTOR 3663984.
- Dixon, Simon (2001). Catherine the Great. HarperCollins. ISBN 978-0060786281.
- Jaques, Susan (2016). The Empress of Art. New York City: Simon & Schuster. ISBN 9781681771144.
- Massie, Robert K. (2011). Catherine the Great: Portrait of a Woman. New York City: Random House. ISBN 978-1-58836-044-1.
- Piotrovsky, Mikhail B. (2001). "An Imperial Affair". Treasures of Catherine the Great (PDF). New York City: Harry N. Abrams. ISBN 9780810967328. Archived from the original (PDF) on 26 May 2021.
- Rounding, Virginia (2008). Catherine the Great: Love, Sex and Power. New York City: St. Martin's Griffin. ISBN 978-0312378639.
- Sebag Montefiore, Simon (2001). The Prince of Princes: The Life of Potemkin. London: Phoenix Books. ISBN 1-84212-438-2.
- Sha, Richard C. (2009). Perverse Romanticism : Aesthetics and Sexuality in Britain, 1750–1832. Baltimore: Johns Hopkins University Press. ISBN 9780801890413. Archived from the original on 24 May 2021.
- Woronzoff-Dashkoff, Alexander (2007). "Dashkova: A Life of Influence and Exile". Transactions of the American Philosophical Society. 97 (3). American Philosophical Society: i–331. ISSN 0065-9746. JSTOR 20171695. Archived from the original (PDF) on 24 May 2021.
