= Nunzio Otello Francesco Gioacchino =

Mameluke of Joachim Murat

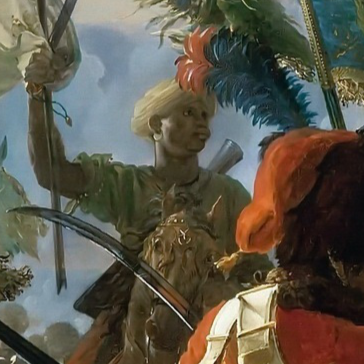
- Otello at the Battle of Austerlitz, capturing a Russian flag. Painting by François Gérard, "La Bataille d'Austerlitz" (c. 1810)
- Born: 1792; Ottoman Empire
- Died: c. 1828; Schloss Frohsdorf, Austrian Empire
- Military career
- Allegiance: (France) French First Republic, First French Empire, Kingdom of Naples (Napoleonic)
- Branch: French Army, Army of the Kingdom of Naples (Napoleonic)
- Service years: 1798–1815
- Rank: Mamelucco del Re
- Conflicts: (France) French Revolutionary Wars, Napoleonic Wars, Neapolitan War
- Awards: Order of the Two Sicilies
- Other work: Servant to Francesco Macdonald and Caroline Bonaparte

Nunzio Otello Francesco Gioacchino (c. 1792, Ottoman Empire – after 1828) was a soldier and servant during the Napoleonic Wars. Born to an Egyptian family in Ottoman Egypt, Otello was taken by French officials during their expedition to Egypt in 1798 under general Napoleon Bonaparte. Otello was a gift to Joachim Murat and became his servant when he was 6 years old. He later became an aide and bodyguard of Murat, and a servant to Caroline Bonaparte, serving as Caroline's personal assistant in the Schloss Frohsdorf estate after her marriage to Francesco MacDonald.

== Early life ==
Little is known about Otello's early life in Egypt. He was born sometime around 1792, and was the son of an Egyptian family living in the Nile Delta. Although referred to as "Arab" or "Moorish" throughout his life, Otello was likely Sudanese or Upper Egyptian, and had ancestry tracing back to African settlements of Egypt.

In 1798, Napoleon Bonaparte led an expedition to Egypt ordered by the Directorate of France. After successive defeats, hundreds of Mamelukes defected and joined the ranks of Napoleon. Napoleon would use these Mamelukes to officially create a Mameluke corps, the precursor to the Mamelukes of the Imperial Guard. On October 19, 1799, Jean-Baptiste Kléber proclaimed that every General of France would receive 10 Mamelukes, while every General of Brigade would receive 6 Mamelukes.

Similarly to Roustam Raza, Otello was one of these Mamelukes offered as a gift to French generals. Joachim Murat would eventually keep Otello as his personal servant. Otello would serve as Murat's servant during the campaign in Egypt, eventually becoming his personal aide, specifically tending to his horse in the rough Egyptian weather.

== The Napoleonic Wars ==
Otello would continue to serve Murat after the French withdrew from Egypt. Murat now entrusted Otello to go on campaign with him. He would do so in 1805 in Germany, 1808 at Capri, 1812 in Russia, 1813 in Germany, and 1815 in Italy.

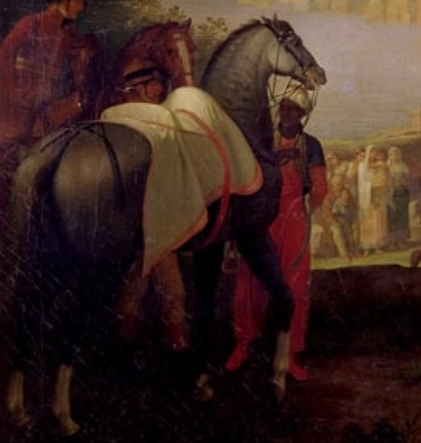
Otello at the Siege of Capri, 1808. Otello is tending to Murat's gray Arabian horse.

During the Austerlitz Campaign, Otello accompanied Murat and served as Murat's servant and assistant. At the Battle of Austerlitz, Otello captured a Russian standard and presented it to Napoleon.

On July 15, 1808, Napoleon appointed Murat to be King of Naples. Otello traveled to Naples with Murat after their victories in Europe, and would become a celebrity and national icon. Otello was given a distinguishable Mameluke uniform, with bright red harem pants, and a golden embroidered green jacket. He was the spectacle of attention, accompanying Murat during public festivals, royal parades, and diplomatic travels. Otello would frequently stay behind with Caroline Bonaparte, Queen of Naples, acting as servant to the estate of Capodimonte, the royal residence of the Murats in Naples.

Otello accompanied Murat during domestic campaigns as well. During the Capture of Capri, Otello tended to Murat's Arabian horse following the conclusion of the engagement.

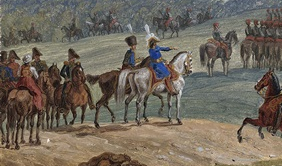
Joachim Murat and his staff at the Battle of Ostrava, 1812. Otello can be seen wearing a red and white outfit with a white turban alongside Murat's staff.

The peak of Otello's military career came in 1812, when he accompanied Murat into Russia. During one morning stationed in Russia, Murat traveled with Otello and his coachman to survey the terrain for the day. Two Polish Cossacks, presumably patrolling the countryside, were spotted on the surrounding hills. After initially passing by, the Cossacks recognized the flamboyant uniform of Murat and began to rapidly charge towards the King. Murat, distracted and unaware of the situation, was nearly killed before Otello and the coachman called out for Murat to draw his sword. Otello swiftly rode to Murat's aid, in defense of the King. During the fight, Otello deflected an attack from one of the Cossacks' lance and cut off his right arm, right as he was ready to impale Murat, causing the other Cossack to flee. Victorious, Murat hailed Otello and the coachman as heroes.

In 1813, after Otello and Murat's return to Naples from Russia, Murat rewarded Otello greatly for his actions on campaign. He granted the Neapolitan cross to Otello, presented him with a royal estate of his own at Castellamare in the countryside of Naples, gifted him a royal carriage for transportation, and most importantly, officially granted Otello his freedom. Otello continued to serve Murat, and would often attend his royal banquets, becoming a national icon, loved and honored by the Neapolitan people.

== The Neapolitan War ==
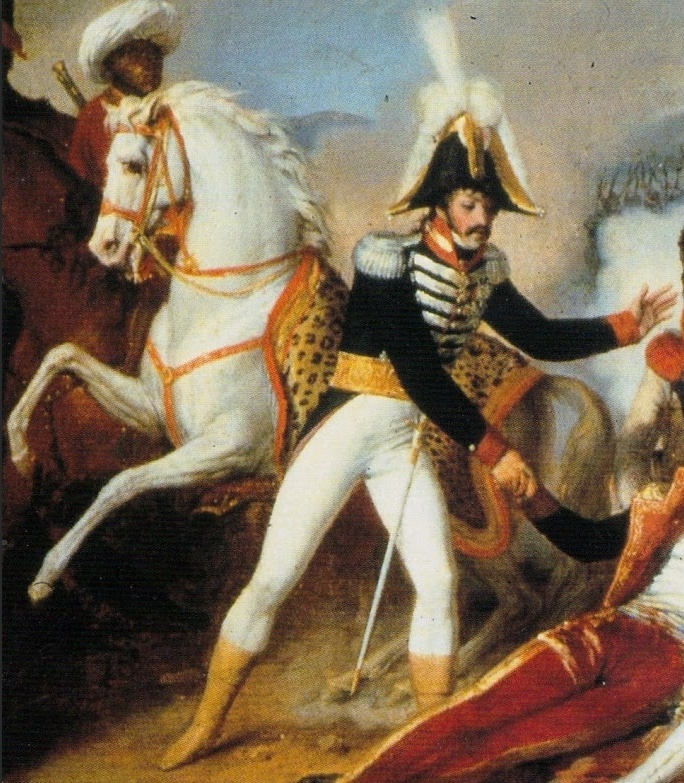
Painting of the Battle of the Panaro (1830). The injured General Carlo Filangieri is seen alongside Joachim Murat. Otello can be seen on the top left corner.

Otello took part in the Neapolitan War of 1815, serving alongside Murat. He was present at the Battle of the Panaro, as he accompanied Murat during the injury of Carlo Filangieri. However, at the Battle of Tolentino, Otello was forced to flee with Murat to Naples, then finally to France to join Napoleon's forces for the Waterloo campaign.

Initially separating from Murat in France, Otello found himself accompanied by other Mamelukes in the city of Marseille. These Mamelukes would be garrisoned there until the defeat of Napoleon at the Battle of Waterloo. Following Napoleon's defeat, the Second restored Bourbon monarchy orchestrated the Second White Terror, targeting those sympathetic to Napoleon and those who assisted his government during the Hundred Days. As part of these crackdowns, a Bourbon mob orchestrated reprisal attacks against the Mamelukes stationed in Marseille, killing 18. Otello was able to survive the massacre and escaped Marseille.

On the 25th of August 1815, Otello fled to Corsica along Murat's entourage to the town of Bastia. Murat took on the title 'Count of Campo Mello', and resided in a relative's estate. After being discovered by the town who celebrated his arrival, Murat was forced to retreat to Vescovato for his own anonymity.

While stationed on a mail boat in the port of Bastia, Otello was ordered to travel to Castellamare, Otello's estate in Naples, in order to deliver personal letters to several high-profile figures in the Neapolitan government. Upon reaching his home, Otello encountered his father-in law, who was worried of detection and arrest. He alerted the Neapolitan authorities to Otello's presence who later arrested him, seizing the letters and imprisoning Otello in the metropolitan dungeon. Neapolitan authorities were alerted to Murat's intentions to reclaim Naples, and immediately began to establish precautionary measures. Gunboats were mobilized to defend the coast, forts were reinforced, and a Sicilian unit was sent to reinforce the fortress of Gaeta.

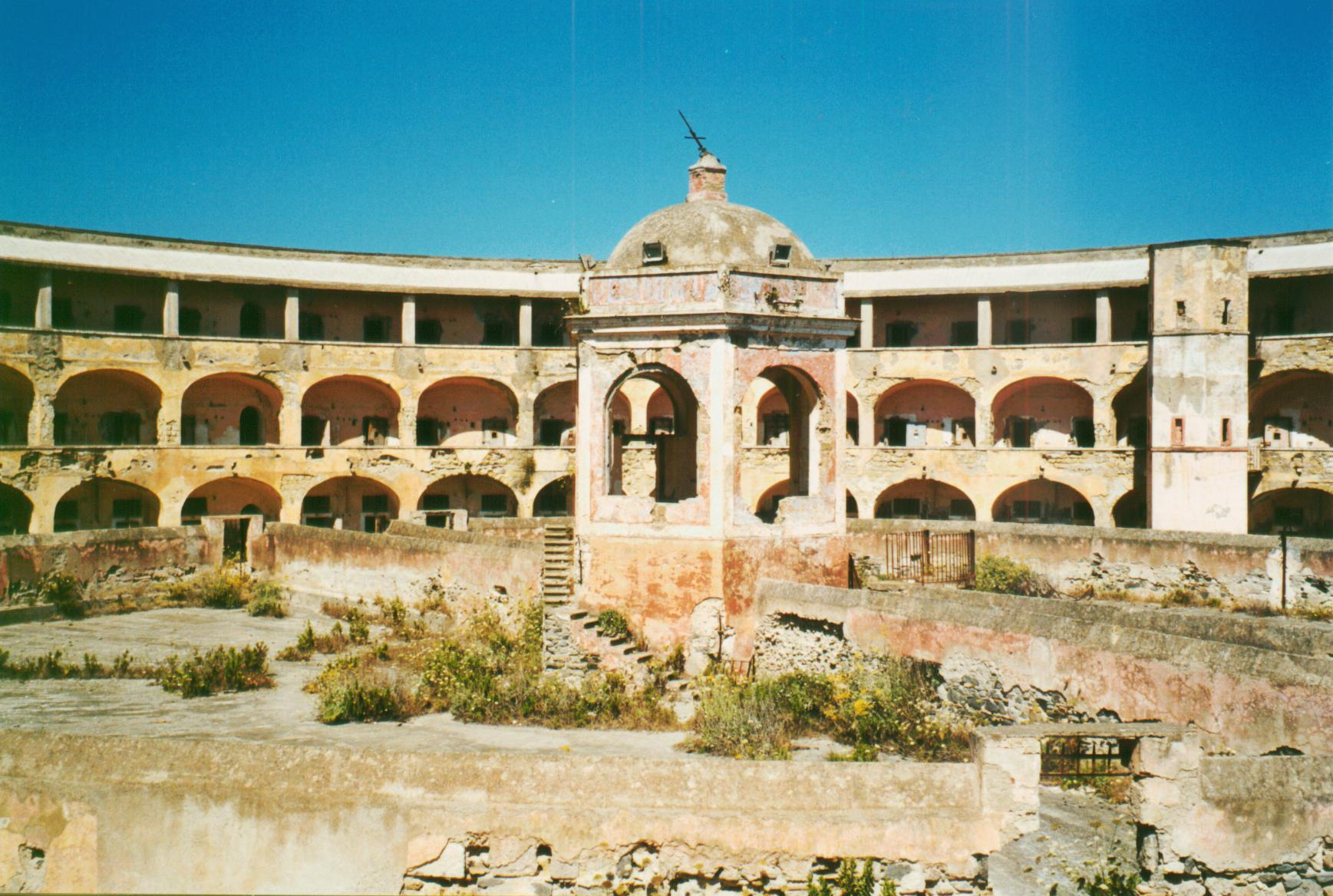
Santo Stefano prison as seen today.

On the 28th of September, due to the arrest of Otello and the possession of Murat's plans, Neapolitan officials sent Luigi Carabelli, a secret agent, to deliver false letters to Murat. These letters advised Murat to land at Salerno, where the Austrians had positioned thousands of men ready to capture Murat. Murat, deceived by these plans, sailed south towards Salerno but was blown off course by a storm. At 10:00 in the morning, Murat landed in Pizzo, where he would later be captured and executed.

Otello was sent to Santo Stefano Prison near the island of Ventotene, on the Tyrrhenian coast. In January 1816, he was released by Austrian officials.

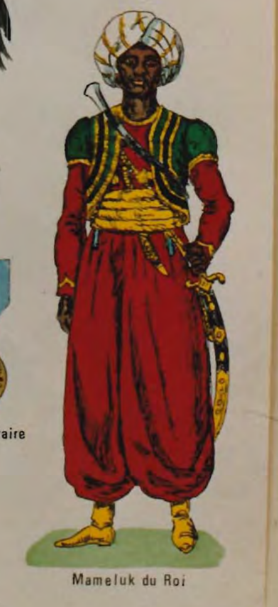
Royal uniform of Otello, as depicted as the "Mameluk du Roi" of Naples

== Later life ==
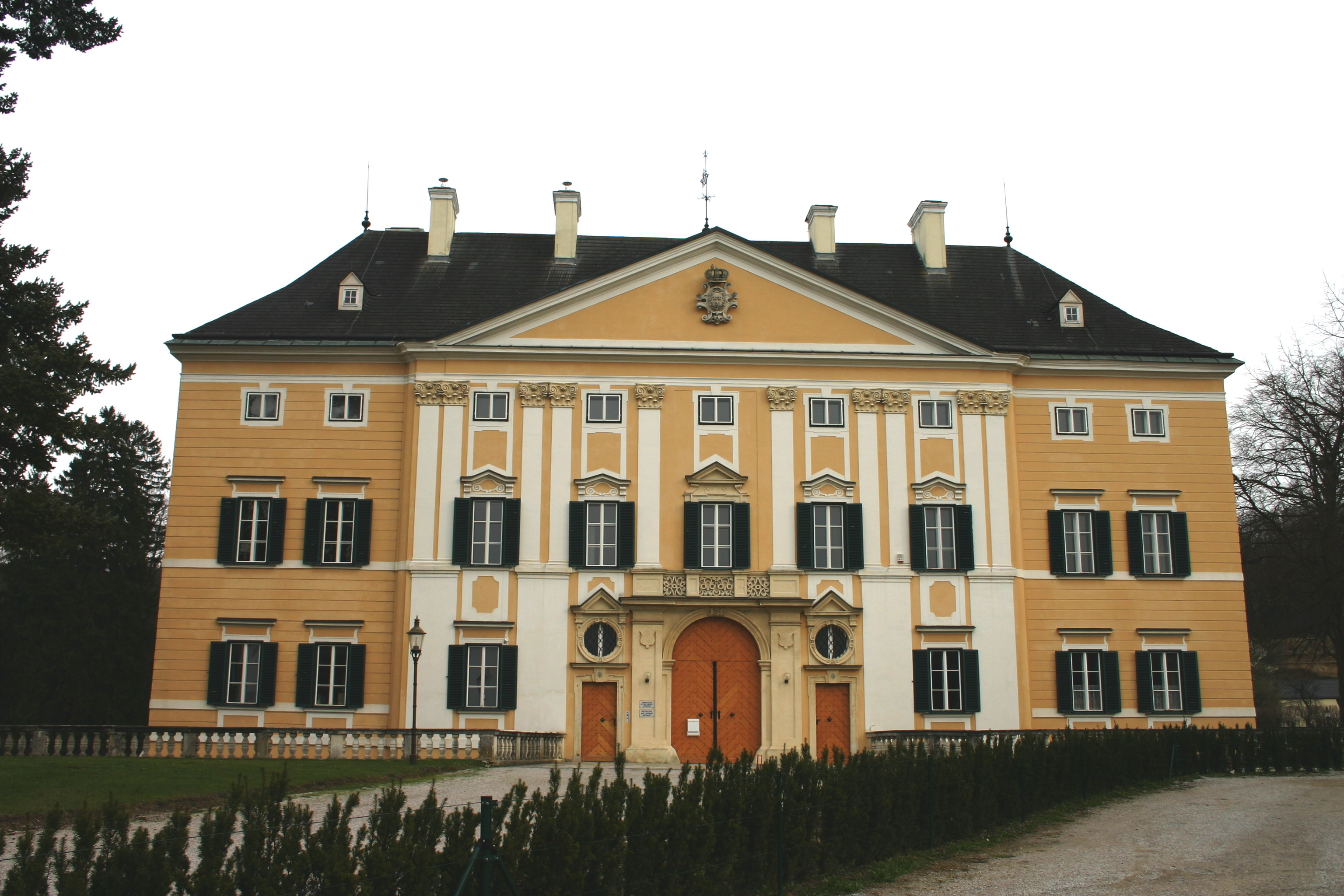
Schloss Frohsdorf in the Austrian countryside. Heavy renovations done after 1945 showcase design changes.

Otello eventually accompanied Caroline Bonaparte after the death her husband, Joachim Murat. Although subject to suspicion by Neapolitan officials, many denied his involvement with Murat, and thanks to his high stature with the Neapolitan people, he was allowed to return to his estate in Castellamare. However, in 1817, Caroline purchased the Schloss Frohsdorf in Lower Austria for 400,000 groschen (around 10,000,000 euros today) under the pseudonym of 'Lipona,' an anagram for 'Napoli.' Caroline brought countless paintings, artifacts, and furniture with her from Naples, around 5 boatloads worth of decorations, along with her new husband, Francesco MacDonald. Otello accompanied Caroline to the estate, where he would live as the primary servant of the house until Caroline sold it to General Alexander Yermolov, a Russian veteran of the Napoleonic Wars in 1828. It is unknown what the fate of Otello was after this sale, as he did not accompany Caroline to America in 1830.

== Personal life and legacy ==
Otello married a Neapolitan woman some time between 1809 and 1812. Otello asked Murat for his permission to marry the woman, to which Murat was amused. He told Otello to accompany himself with his fiancée to the Queen in order to seek her approval, to which the Queen adamantly denied his request, stating that the Neapolitan woman was too beautiful for Otello. However, Murat intervened on Otello's behalf, and organized his marriage that very day. Otello was baptized as a Christian, with both Joachim Murat and Caroline Bonaparte being his godparents, officially naming him 'Otello' after the renown play 'Othello' by William Shakespeare, later popularized by Gioachino Rossini's Italian adaptation.

Unfortunately, due to the racial status of Otello, very few legal records exist of his birth, marriage, and death in Italian and Austrian records.

Otello was forgotten by history until Alexander Dumas' publication of Murat in 1838. In fact, many viewed Mamelukes negatively due to their public perception of embodying excessive violence, tyranny, and illicit sexuality during the Napoleonic Wars. However, following the romanticism of African soldiers with the Second French Empire under Napoleon III, Otello and various other Mamelukes such as Roustam Raza began to be portrayed in paintings, woodcuts, prints, and artwork. Mamelukes and the Kingdom of Naples would continue to receive attention in Italian audiences as Italian historians began to look to their past during Risorgimento, and began to study Joachim Murat specifically for his Rimini Proclamation, the precursor to an official call towards Italian unification.

== See also ==
- List of people who disappeared mysteriously (pre-1910)
