= Virginia Rounding =

Author and literary critic

Virginia Rounding (born October 1956) is an author and literary critic who specialises in Russia and women's history.

She has written a number of works on Parochial church council management with Martin Dudley.

== Selected publications ==
- Grandes Horizontales: The Lives and Legends of Four Nineteenth-Century Courtesans: Marie Duplessis, Cora Pearl, La Païva, and La Présidente (1st ed.). New York: Bloomsbury. 2004. ISBN 9781582344508.
- Catherine the Great: Love, Sex and Power (1st ed.). New York: St. Martin's Press. 2006. ISBN 978-0-312-32887-0.
- Alix and Nicky: The Passion of the Last Tsar and Tsarina (1st ed.). New York: St. Martin's Griffin. 2013. ISBN 9781250022196.
- Rounding, Virginia (2017). The Burning Time: The Story of the Smithfield Martyrs: Henry VIII, Bloody Mary, and the Protestant martyrs of London (1 ed.). New York, N.Y.: Macmillan. ISBN 9781250040640.
- jtly, with; Dudley, Martin (2003). Churchwardens: a Survival Guide. The Office and Role of Churchwardens of the Twenty-First Century. SPCK Publishing. ISBN 9780281050734.
- jtly, with; Dudley, Martin (2004). The Parish Survival Guide. SPCK Publishing. ISBN 9780281056651.
- jtly, with; Dudley, Martin (2006). Serving the Parish. SPCK Publishing. ISBN 9780281057184.
