= Mamelukes of the Imperial Guard =

French military unit (1801–1815)

- Mamelouks de la Garde impériale
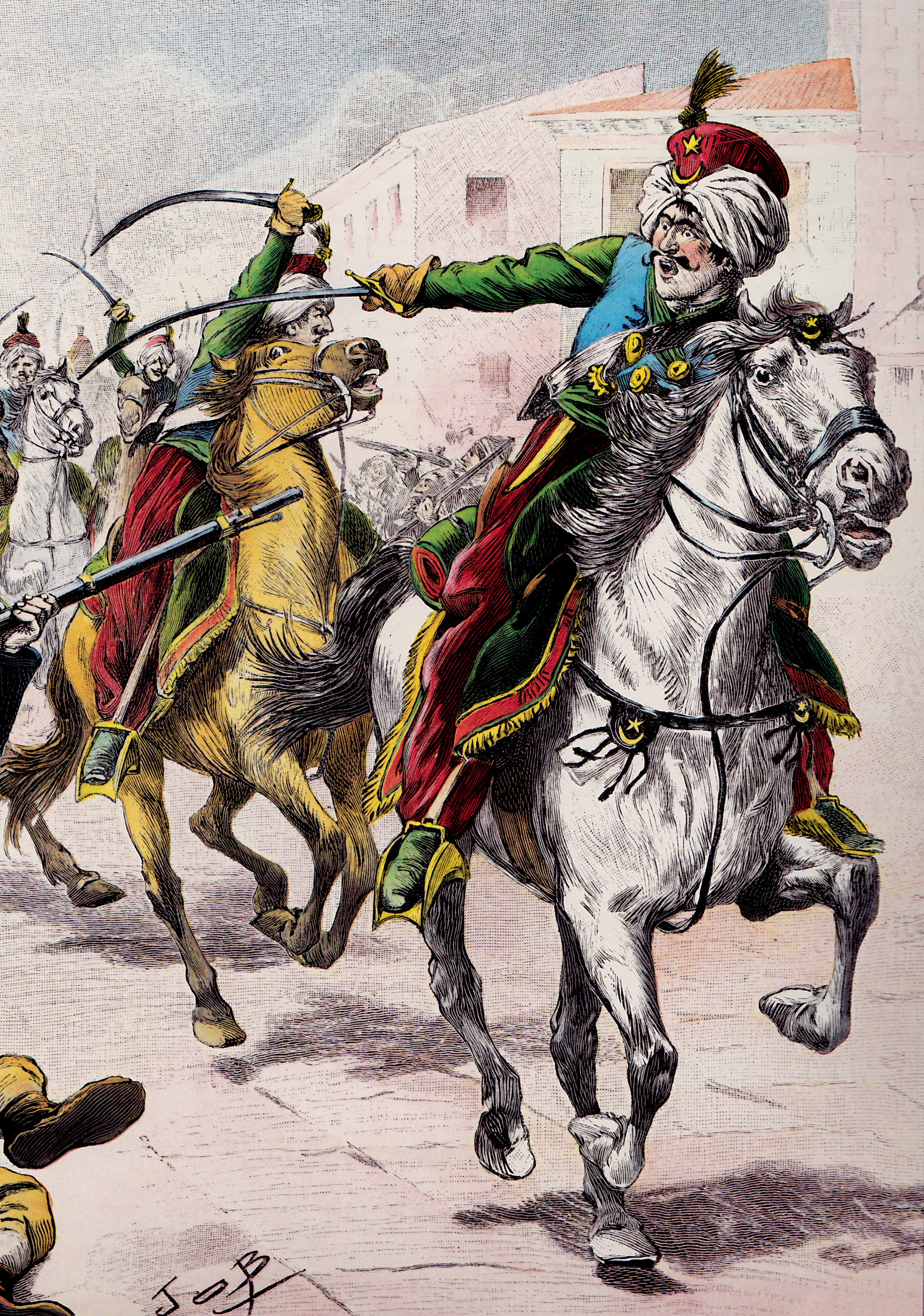
- Charge of the Mamelukes of the Imperial Guard on the streets of Madrid, during the Dos de Mayo Uprising. Illustration by Job, 1929.
- Active: 1801–1815
- Country: France
- Branch: Grande Armée
- Type: Light cavalry
- Size: Squadron (1802-1803, 1813-1815); Company (1803-1812)
- Part of: Consular Guard (1802-1804); Imperial Guard (1804-1815)
- Garrison: Melun
- Engagements: Napoleonic Wars

Commanders
- Commanders: Jean Rapp; Pierre Louis Dupas; Charles Delaitre; Jean Renno (interim); François Antoine Kirmann

The Mamelukes of the Imperial Guard (French: Mamelouks de la Garde impériale) were a light cavalry unit of Egyptian origin that served in Napoleon’s Imperial Guard from 1801 to 1815. It was the third cavalry formation integrated into the Guard and its first foreign component. Initially recruited during the Egyptian campaign, the Mamelukes were repatriated with the French troops to metropolitan France where they were organized into a squadron, later reduced to a simple company. The various spellings of the squadron's name include Mamelukes, Mamluks, Mamelouks and Mameloucks.

During the First French Empire, the Mamelukes were attached to the regiment of mounted chasseurs of the Imperial Guard. Their first major engagement took place during the Battle of Austerlitz, where they contributed to the rout of the cavalry of the Russian Imperial Guard. After distinguishing itself several times in Poland, the company left for Spain in 1808 and took an active part in the suppression of the Dos de Mayo Uprising, during which fierce fighting pitted the Mamelukes against insurgents in the streets of Madrid. Still attached to the mounted chasseurs, the unit took part in the Austrian campaign of 1809, then in the Russian campaign of 1812. The following year, having become the 10th Chasseur Squadron, the Mamelukes distinguished themselves at Reichenbach, Hanau and in the French campaign of 1814.

After Napoleon's first abdication, a few Mamelukes accompanied the deposed Emperor to the island of Elba, while most of the unit's personnel joined the Bourbon Restoration's Royal Corps of Chasseurs of France. The squadron was re-established during the Hundred Days and was present at Waterloo alongside the mounted chasseurs of the Guard. On the king's return, the so-called "true" Mamelukes were finally sent back to the Marseille depot: many of them were murdered there in a massacre during the White Terror of 1815. In 1830, a handful of survivors accompanied the French troops at the start of the conquest of Algeria as interpreters.

== Origins ==
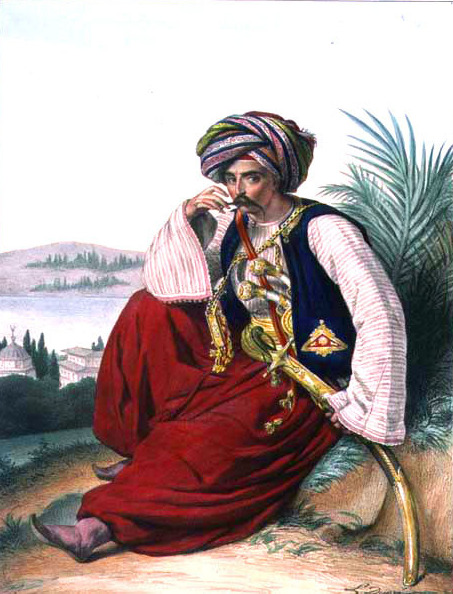
Mamelouk by Louis Dupré, 1825

Around the 1230s, the Sultan of Egypt, eager to create a corps of soldiers devoted to his person, bought from Ögedei Khan's Mongols a large number of young slaves captured during their conquests. These boys, converted to Islam, then received a military education in which they learned the handling of weapons and horsemanship. Once this training was completed, they joined the corps of Mamluks placed directly under the Sultan's authority. In 1250, they seized power in Egypt and maintained an independent status for the next two centuries. The country was finally invaded by the Ottomans at the beginning of the 16th century and the Mamluks, defeated, had to accept the presence of a pasha who ruled the territory in close connection with Constantinople.

With the gradual decline of Ottoman power, however, the pashas saw their influence diminish considerably while Egypt was in the grip of serious political instability. When the French army of General Napoleon Bonaparte landed on the Egyptian coast in 1798, the country was controlled by a duumvirate, Murad Bey and Ibrahim Bey. Having defeated the other Mamluk leaders after a long struggle, they agreed to share power in 1785, with Ibrahim in charge of administrative tasks and Murad in command of the Mamluk army. The Mamluks then enjoyed great prestige in Egyptian society: according to Darcy G. Grigsby, "they were defined by their powerful military function, their costume, and the superior characteristics that earned them membership in such an elite."

== Egyptian campaign ==
In 1798, Napoleon Bonaparte landed in Alexandria with about 40,000 men and began the conquest of Egypt. Murad Bey gathered his horsemen and tried to stop him at Chebreiss, then at the Battle of the Pyramids. Each time, the Mamluks faced the discipline and firepower of the French, who were formed in squares, and suffered heavy losses. Murad and the rest of his troops fled to Upper Egypt. Bonaparte ordered General Desaix to pursue them, while Bonaparte himself entered Cairo and subdued the population. However, the destruction of the French fleet at the Battle of the Nile compromised the situation, as Bonaparte could no longer count on reinforcements from France. He therefore decided to make the best use of the resources that Egypt offered him and, in September 1798, decreed that all Mamluks aged eight to sixteen, as well as the slaves of Mamluks in the same age group, were to be incorporated into the French army. After his victory at Abukir in 1799, judging his presence in Paris to be more important, Bonaparte left command of the Army of the Orient to General Kléber and returned to France accompanied by part of his staff.

Once in command, Kléber continued to enlist the services of the Mamluks. In November 1799, the French orderlies to the generals were replaced by Mamluks who fulfilled the same functions. By the end of February 1800, there were 278 Mamluks fighting alongside the Army of the Orient. General Menou, who succeeded Kléber after his assassination, continued the work of his predecessor by creating two companies of Syrian janissaries and a company of Mamluks to serve as auxiliary troops. In October 1800, these three companies were merged into a single regiment, named the Regiment of Mamelukes of the Republic, organized in a similar way to French cavalry units. In 1801, the situation of the French worsened: a British expeditionary corps, commanded by General Abercromby, landed in Egypt and defeated the French army at Canope on 21 March. Menou capitulated in August and his troops embarked for France. 760 Mamluks, Syrian janissaries and soldiers of the Greek Legion, who were authorized to follow the French army with their families, embarked on the troopship HMS Pallas and eventually ended up in Marseille at the "Depot of the Egyptians" near the neighbourhood of La Castellane.

== In France ==
=== Organization ===
They were men of all races and colors: mountaineers from Georgia and Circassia and horsemen from the Crimea, Arabia, Syria (probably including Armenians), Egypt, Abyssinia, Darfur (probably mostly blacks), Albania, the Turkish Balkan provinces, Hungary, Malta, Tunisia, and Algeria. Two of their officers were from Bethlehem.

— American historian John R. Elting, on the composition of the corps of Mamelukes.

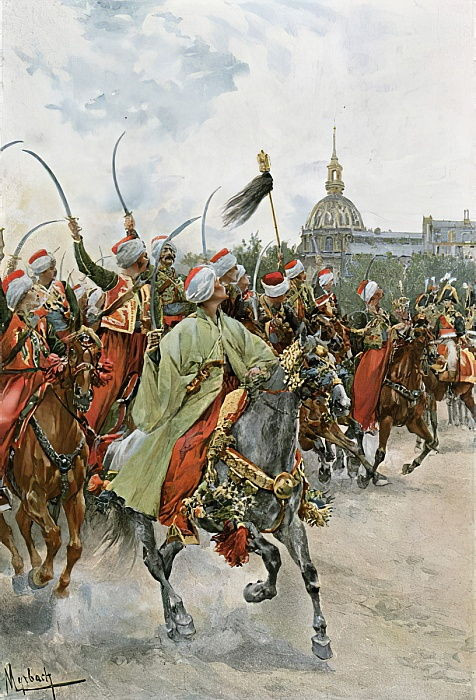
Mamelukes of the Guard in a military parade by Felician Myrbach

On 13 October 1801, Napoleon ordered his aide-de-camp, Colonel Jean Rapp, to organize a squadron of 240 cavalrymen chosen from among the refugees from Egypt. On his arrival in Marseille, Rapp noted that a number of them were old or undisciplined, which prompted Napoleon to reduce the number of men to 150 in early 1802. Nearly all of this new corps, with the exception of a few French officers, was composed of Mamelukes as well as Syrian or Coptic soldiers who had fought with the French troops in Egypt. During this time, the First Consul wanted the Mamelukes to serve as his personal escort without being part of the Consular Guard. It was not until 15 April 1802 that the squadron was integrated into the Guard, in the form of two companies of 80 men. On 1 October, the unit was reorganized and now totaled 13 officers and 159 men, as well as a drummer. This force included:

- a staff, composed of a colonel, a quartermaster captain, a captain in charge of the administration, a lieutenant instructor, a sergeant major, an adjutant, a veterinarian, a chief trumpeter, a master saddler, a master tailor, a master shoemaker and a master weaponsmith;
- two companies, each composed of a captain, a first lieutenant, a second lieutenant, a sub-lieutenant, a chief maréchal des logis, four maréchaux des logis, a fourrier, eight brigadiers, two trumpeters, fifty-nine Mamelukes and an intendant.

Shortly afterwards, the Mamelukes made their way to Melun where they established themselves in the present Augereau district, while the refugees unfit for service remained in Marseille with their families. In early May 1803, Rapp left the corps and was replaced first by Colonel Pierre Louis Dupas and then, on 29 August, by Captain Charles Delaitre. On 21 January 1804, the Mamelukes were attached to the Mounted Chasseurs of the Imperial Guard, which became the Imperial Guard in May. They were finally annexed to the Mounted Chasseurs Regiment in the form of a 125-men company. The salary was 457.50 francs for the cavalry and between 2,000 and 4,000 francs for the officers. The sums allocated to the Mamelukes were initially lower than for the chasseurs due to the cost of their uniforms, but they increased over time. As for the horses, they did not come from Egypt but were those used by the mounted chasseurs.

== Campaigns ==
=== From Austerlitz to Eylau ===
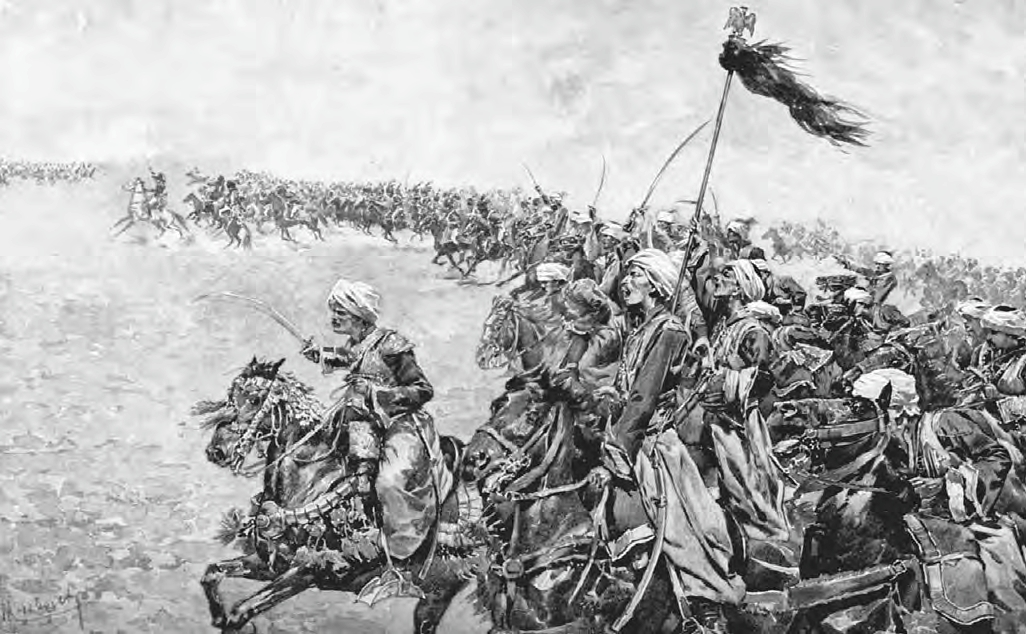
Mamelukes charge the Russian cavalry of Grand Duke Konstantin along with the mounted chasseurs during the Battle of Austerlitz. Painting by Felician Myrbach, 1906.

At the Battle of Austerlitz, the Mamelukes were in the reserve, under Rapp, with the rest of the Imperial Guard cavalry, when the Russian cavalry charged onto the Pratzen Heights and dispersed two French regiments of the Vandamme division. After an unsuccessful counterattack by two squadrons of mounted chasseurs supported by three squadrons of mounted grenadiers, Napoleon ordered Rapp to charge at the head of the last two squadrons of chasseurs and the Mamelukes in order to restore the situation. The Mamelukes threw themselves into the mêlée, but the impact of their charge was mitigated by the mass of men and horses. Lieutenant Renno rushed at a Russian square and opened a breach, which was quickly exploited by the Mamelukes, who broke through the formation and took 120 prisoners. Encouraged by this success, Rapp's cavalrymen seized a battery before contributing to the rout of the Russian Imperial Guard cavalry. Following this victorious engagement, two Mamelukes each came to throw an enemy standard at Napoleon's feet. The company's losses amounted to one dead and five wounded.

The Mamelukes did not take part in the Battle of Jena–Auerstedt, but entered Berlin on 27 October 1806. They charged the Russian cavalry at Pułtusk, losing 20 men wounded. At the Battle of Eylau, they took part under Captain Renno in the charge of the Guard cavalry led by Marshal Bessières, following the grenadiers and the mounted chasseurs. This engagement cost them four officers and five Mamelukes wounded. Following the departure of chef d'escadron Delaitre, appointed major of the Polish light cavalry of the Guard in April 1807, Captain Renno assumed interim command.

=== In the Iberian Peninsula ===
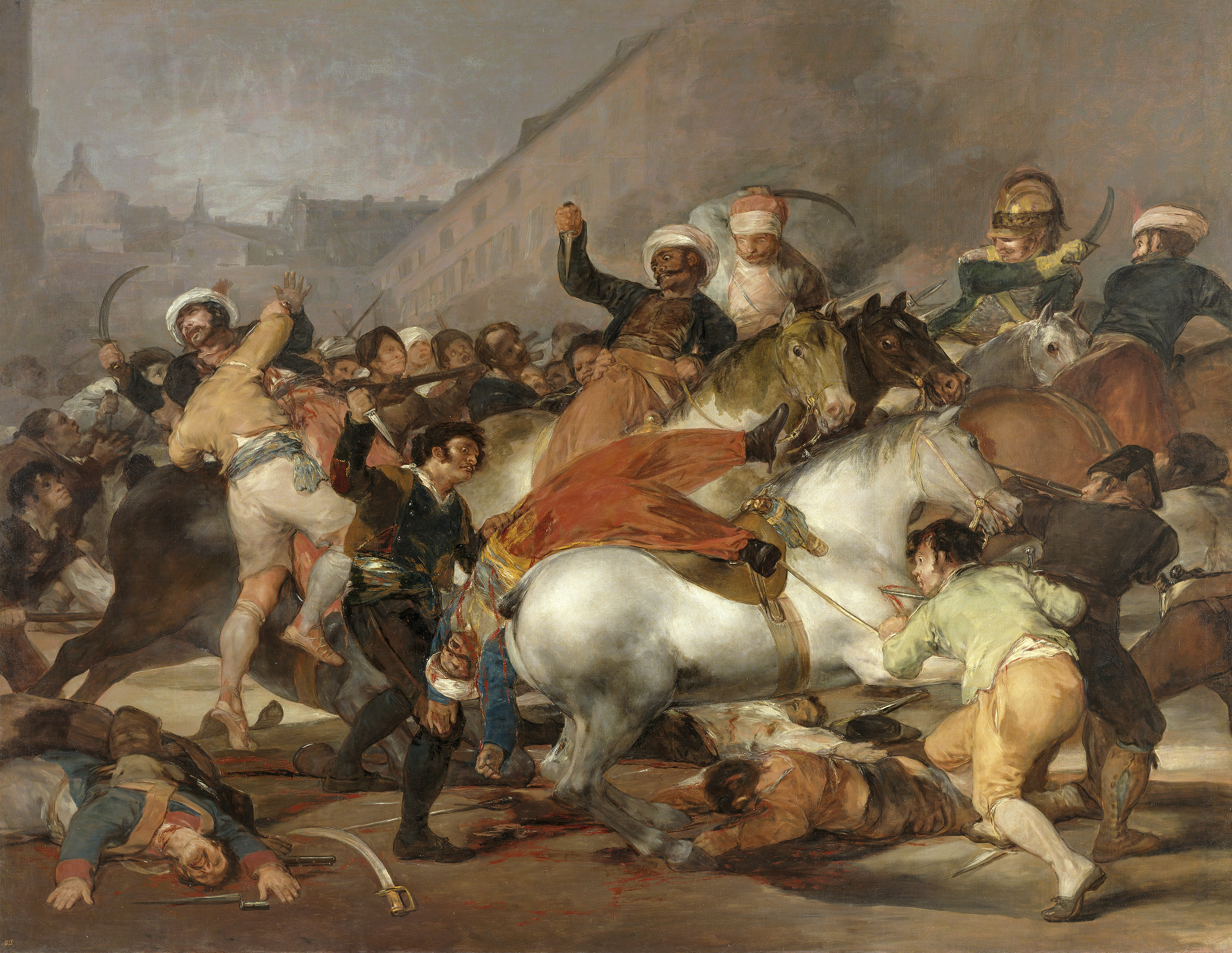
El dos de mayo de 1808 en Madrid by Francisco de Goya, also titled La carga de los mamelucos ("The Charge of the Mamelukes"). The company suffered only minor losses, contrarily to what the painting suggests.

In 1808, Napoleon ordered Marshal Murat to enter Spain and occupy Madrid. The Mamelukes took part in this expedition. Staunchly Catholic, the Spanish people remembered the period of Muslim rule in the Iberian Peninsula by the Moors, and was offended by the presence of the Muslims who entered the capital on 24 March 1808. The abdication of King Charles IV and then of his son Ferdinand in favor of Joseph Bonaparte, the Emperor's brother, exacerbated tensions between the Spanish and the French.

In April, the company of Mamelukes numbered 86 men. Seeking to expand this force, chef d'escadron Daumesnil, commanding the detachment of chasseurs of the Guard in Spain, asked permission to enlist foreigners, former Mamelukes but also Greeks or Spaniards, which Napoleon refused: "I created this corps to reward those men who served me in Egypt, and not to make a collection of adventurers." On 2 May, the people of Madrid revolted and attacked isolated soldiers. Murat then ordered the cavalry to enter the city to suppress the riot. The mounted chasseurs of the Guard led by Daumesnil advanced first, followed by the Mamelukes and the rest of the Guard cavalry. Passing through Alcalá Street, where they had rocks thrown at them, the French cavalrymen reached the Puerta del Sol where many Spaniards had gathered.

The Mamelukes's arrival marked the beginning of merciless fighting. The Madrid rebels assaulted the horsemen with knives, jumped onto their mounts behind them and tried to dismount them. For their part, the Mamelukes responded with scimitar strikes and skillfully cut off heads, a hundred "in an instant" according to Marbot. In the mêlée, Lieutenant Chahin saved chef d'escadron Daumesnil, who had fallen to the ground after having his horse killed from under him, before being struck in turn; the residents of a house on San Geronimo Street were also massacred by the Mamelukes in retaliation for the killing of two of their comrades. At the end of the fighting, the company had its five officers injured as well as three horsemen killed or mortally wounded, losses that Ronald Pawly considered as "relatively limited" compared to the painter Goya's depictions. Edward Ryan instead mentions only two killed.

In July, the Mamelukes and chasseurs of Daumesnil served as escorts for King Joseph during his first brief stay in Madrid. A few months later, in November 1808, Napoleon entered Spain at the head of the Grande Armée in order to expel the British from the peninsula. The Mamelukes, who had in the meantime taken part in the Battle of Medina de Rioseco, took part in the pursuit of the retreating British troops towards La Coruña. On 29 December, they arrived at Benavente where the enemy rearguard cavalry under Henry Paget was positioned. The three squadrons of mounted chasseurs of the Guard and the detachment of Mamelukes, under the command of General Lefebvre-Desnouettes, crossed the river Esla and charged towards the city, but Paget struck at the French from the flank and managed to push them back. This setback cost the Mamelukes two killed - including Lieutenant Azaria -, two wounded and one prisoner.

=== Second Austrian campaign and return to Spain ===
In 1809, after returning to their garrison at Melun, the company of Mamelukes joined the Grande Armée to take part in the Austrian campaign of the War of the Fifth Coalition. They missed the Battle of Essling but took part in that of Wagram, where the Mameluke Baraka was wounded. Once the campaign was over, the Mamelukes received the order to return to Spain. Without being directly engaged in the front line of battles, they actively fought against the guerrillas, which caused them several losses. They also distinguished themselves at Prádanos on 24 May 1809, where a charge by the company led by Captain Renno resulted in the capture of around a hundred Spanish soldiers. On 1 March 1812, the company, now numbering no more than 55 men, left the peninsula definitively to join the army stationed in Poland, in preparation for the Russian campaign.

=== Final campaigns: Russia, Germany and France ===
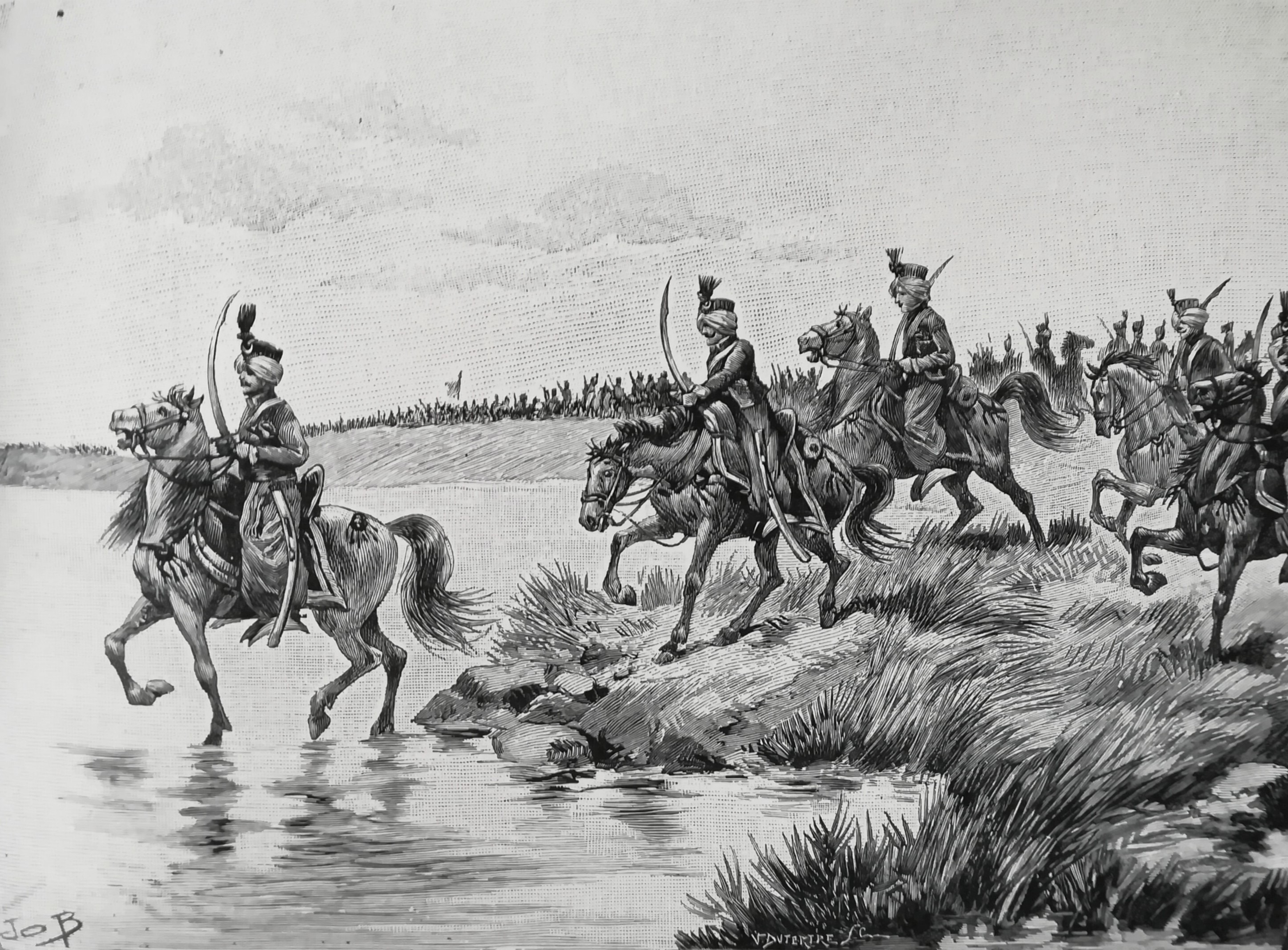
Mamelukes of the Guard on campaign. Illustration by Job.

On 1 July 1812, shortly after the entry of the French army into Russia, the company's strength was increased to 109 horsemen. The Mamelukes, as with the rest of the Imperial Guard, were not actively engaged in the first phase of the campaign. Napoleon occupied Moscow in mid-September but had to leave the following month with the arrival of winter. During the retreat from Russia, the Mamelukes had their first serious engagement at the Battle of Gorodnia on 25 October, during which they helped to protect the Emperor from a Cossack attack. Chef d'escadron Kirmann was wounded on this occasion. Their losses increased from this point forward: by 16 December 1812, 34 men had been declared dead, captured or missing.

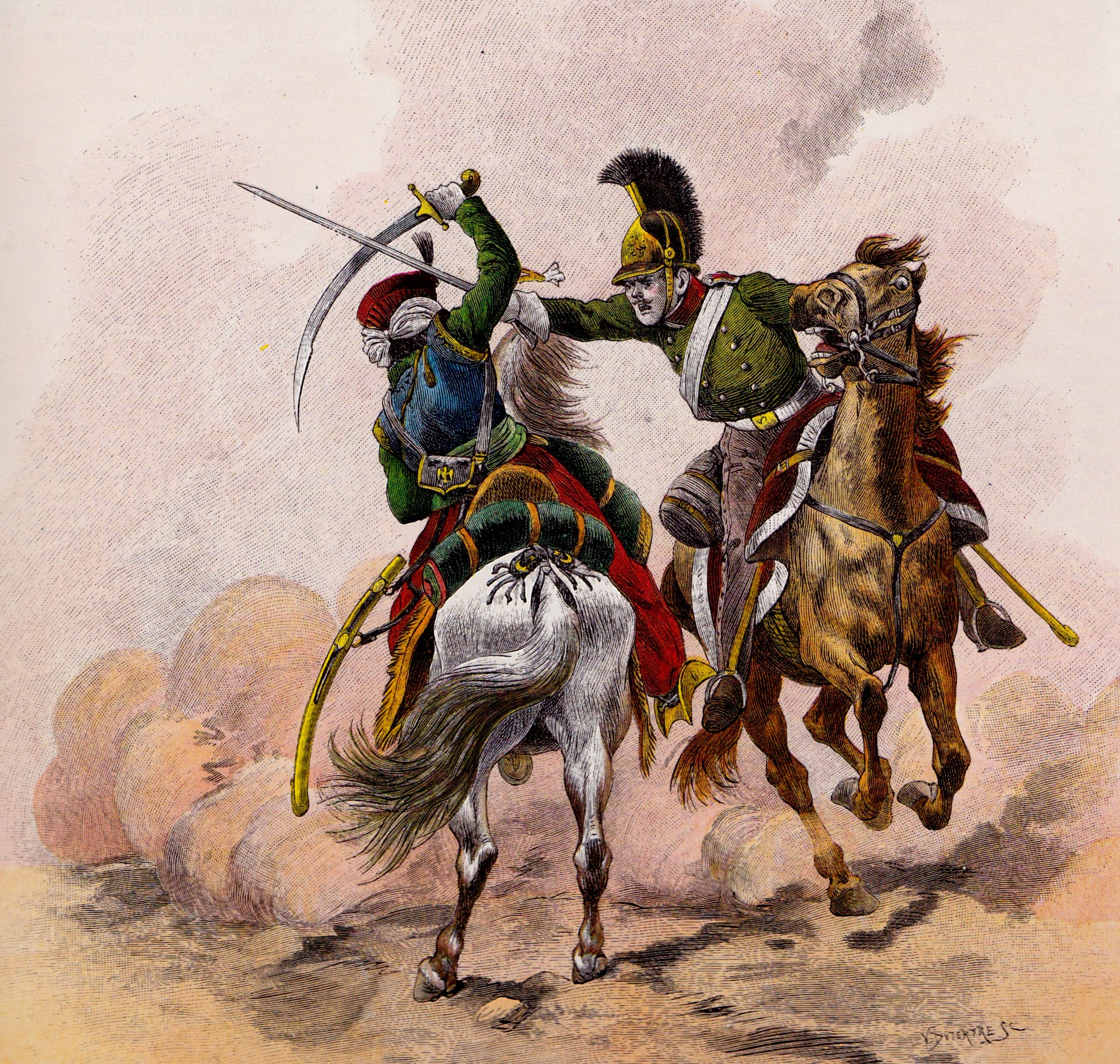
A Mameluke of the Imperial Guard fights a Russian dragoon. Illustration by Job.

The losses suffered in the Russian campaign required a reorganization of the Guard cavalry. On 18 January 1813, the Mameluke company became the 10th Squadron of the mounted chasseurs of the Guard. This squadron was composed of the 1st Company, attached to the Old Guard, and the 2nd Company, integrated into the Young Guard and essentially made up of conscripts. Until June 1813, the Mamelukes remained in the background of the battles and ensured the Emperor's protection. They distinguished themselves however on 22 May at the Battle of Reichenbach when, sent to support the Polish lancers at the head of the mounted chasseurs, the squadron deployed against a brigade of Russian cuirassiers and executed a short-range carbine salvo, causing their enemies to flee. In October, the Mamelukes were present at the Battle of Leipzig where one of them was taken prisoner. Napoleon, defeated at Leipzig, ordered a retreat towards France. On 30 October, the Bavarians tried to stop the French army at the Battle of Hanau. During the Guard cavalry's successive charges against the enemy cavalry and artillery, the Mamelukes lost chef d'escadron Abdallah Hazboun, to injury. In total, 59 of the squadron's cavalrymen died during the German campaign of 1813.

Despite these losses, the Mamelukes distinguished themselves again in 1814 during the French campaign. They were present at the First Battle of Saint-Dizier on 27 January. Arriving on 10 February near Montmirail with Napoleon, they charged the next day following Letort's Dragoons of the Imperial Guard; the latter broke through several Russian infantry squares, whose survivors were cut to pieces by the Mamelukes and the mounted grenadiers. They were present at the Battle of Château-Thierry on 12 February and at that of Arcis-sur-Aube on 20 and 21 March, where the Mameluke Riva was wounded eight times. Three days later, the Allies decided to push towards Paris and defeated the troops of Marshals Mortier and Marmont at Fère-Champenoise on 25 March. General Wintzingerode's Russian contingent, charged with creating a diversion, was routed by Napoleon at Saint-Dizier on 26 March, where a platoon of Mamelukes, charging with the Guard cavalry, seized a battery of 18 cannons. Nevertheless, on 30 March, the Coalition armies attacked the capital. General Dautancourt took command of the cavalry of the Guard present in Paris, which brought together mounted grenadiers, chasseurs, dragoons, Mamelukes, lancers and Polish scouts. During the Battle of Paris, this disparate force took part in the defense of Clichy and then of the Montmartre hill, before retreating under enemy artillery fire.

=== Elba and the Hundred Days ===
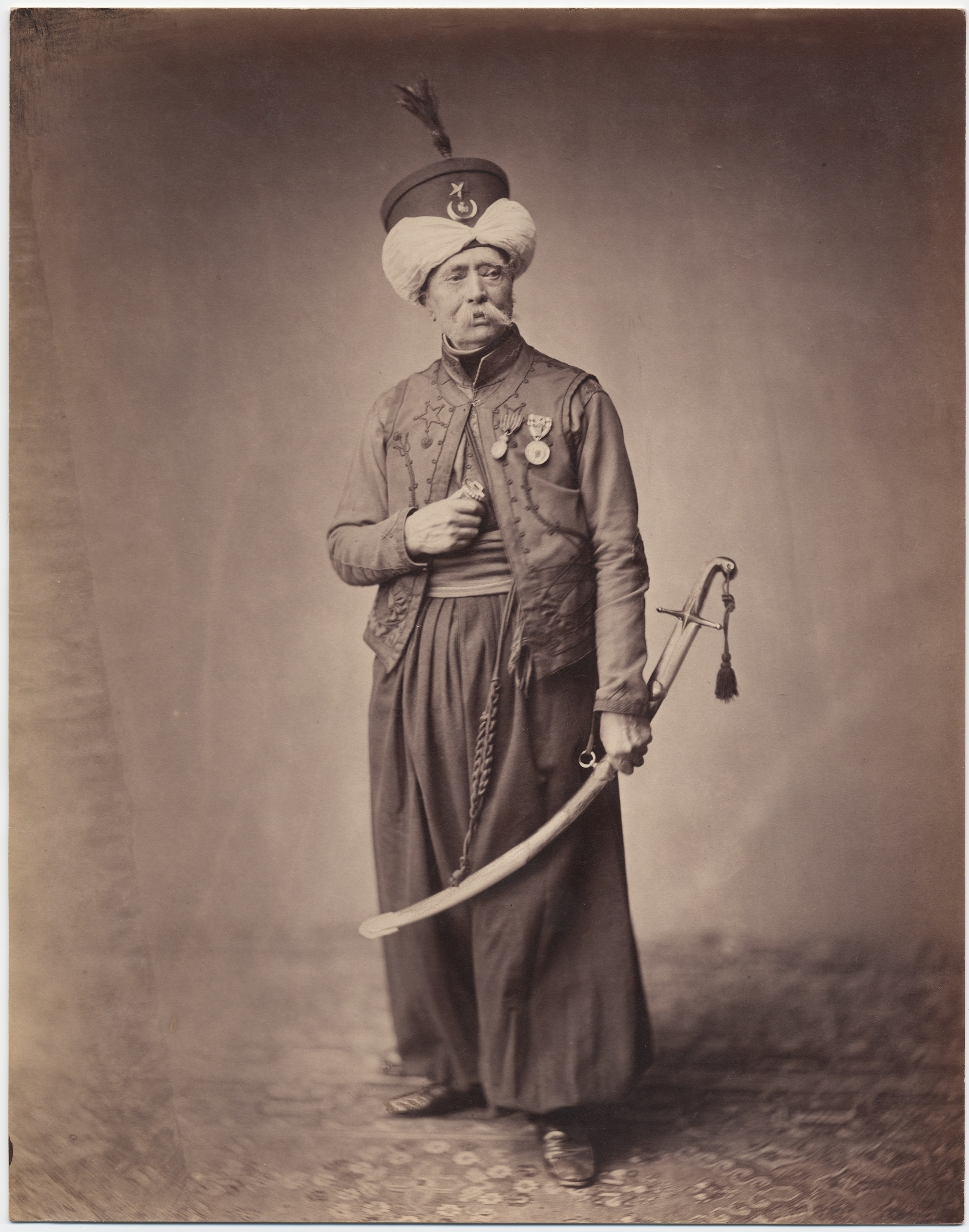
François Ducel, a Mameluke from 1813 to 1815, photographed c. 1858 wearing the Saint-Helena Medal.

Following Napoleon's abdication and the restoration of the Bourbons, the company of Mamelukes of the Old Guard was integrated into the Royal Corps of Chasseurs de France (Corps royal des chasseurs de France), essentially composed of former mounted chasseurs of the Guard. On that date, of the 41 horsemen still in the unit, only 18 were genuine Mamelukes from the Egyptian campaign. The Young Guard company was transferred to the 7th mounted chasseurs Regiment; in addition, an officer and seven Mamelukes accompanied the Emperor to the island of Elba as part of the squadron of Polish lancers of the Guard. During the Hundred Days, the refugees from the Marseille depot enthusiastically welcomed Napoleon's return. A decree of 24 April 1815 reorganized the Mameluke squadron into two companies: the Mamelukes serving in the Royal Corps of Chasseurs de France were reintegrated, as well as 94 other Mamelukes who had returned to service. In total, the unit counted approximately 120 men. Its commander was chef d'escadron Kirmann. In June 1815, alongside the mounted chasseurs of the guard, the Mamelukes took part in the Belgian campaign, where they were present at the battles of Ligny and Waterloo. They suffered no losses during this campaign.

Under the Second Bourbon Restoration, the true Mamelukes returned to their families who had settled in Marseille. During the Second White Terror, royalists in Marseille attacked the refugee community and many Mamelukes were murdered by the mob; the population of the depot fell by two thirds. Part of it then left for Egypt before returning to France shortly afterwards for fear of reprisals from the Turks, while others were sent to Île Sainte-Marguerite by order of the authorities. After these events, most of the former Mamelukes were reduced to living in great poverty. Four of them, former officers of the corps, took part in the conquest of Algeria in 1830 as interpreters. In total, 577 men served in the Mamelukes of the Guard, according to the nominal list drawn up by Jean Savant. One of the last survivors of the unit, photographed around 1858, was François Ducel, a Frenchman born in 1789 in Saône-et-Loire who enlisted in the Mamelukes in March 1813.

== Commanders ==
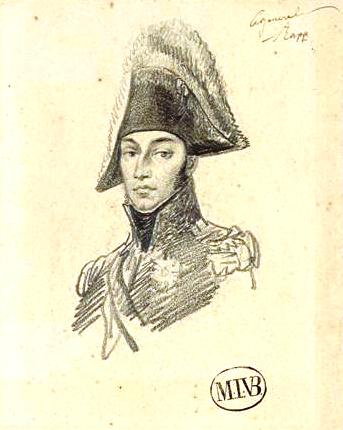
Jean Rapp commanded the Squadron of Mamelukes from 1801 to 1803. Portrait by Mattheus Ignatius van Bree.

By decree of 21 Vendémiaire Year X (13 October 1801), First Consul Napoleon Bonaparte ordered one of his aides-de-camp, Colonel Jean Rapp, to organize and take command of the squadron of Mamelukes. Rapp carried out the task and led the squadron until May 1803, when he took command of the 7th Hussar Regiment. He was replaced by Pierre Louis Dupas, an officer who had participated in the storming of the Bastille in 1789 as well as in the Italian and Egyptian campaigns. He left the unit after his promotion to general of brigade on 29 August 1803.

Captain Antoine Charles Bernard Delaitre succeeded Dupas and was bruised on the eve of the Battle of Pułtusk while leading his cavalrymen. On 7 April 1807, he was appointed colonel-major of the Polish light cavalry of the Imperial Guard; while waiting for a new chef d'escadron, interim command was exercised by Captain Jean Renno, from Acre. This interim ended on 10 September 1808 when chef d'escadron François Antoine Kirmann, from the mounted chasseurs of the Guard, was appointed commander of the company of Mamelukes. He occupied this post until the end of the Empire in 1814 and again during the Hundred Days.

== See also ==
- Mamluk
- Roustam Raza
- Nunzio Otello Francesco Gioacchino
- Imperial Guard Cavalry (First Empire)
- Lithuanian Tatars of the Imperial Guard
