= Pierre-Louis Dupas =

French soldier (1761–1823)

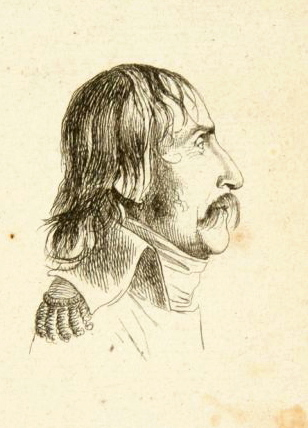
- A portrait of Pierre-Louis Dupas
- Born: 13 February 1761; Évian, France
- Died: 6 March 1823 (aged 62); Thonon, France
- Military career
- Allegiance: Kingdom of Sardinia, Republic of Genoa, Kingdom of France (1791-1792), French First Republic, First French Empire
- Branch: French Army
- Service years: 1775-1809, 1813
- Rank: Général de division
- Nickname: Le général Z'en avant
- Conflicts: French Revolutionary Wars; Napoleonic Wars

Count of the Empire Pierre-Louis Dupas (French pronunciation: [pjɛʁ lwi dypɑ]; 13 February 1761 – 6 March 1823) was a French soldier who rose to prominence during the French Revolutionary Wars, was noted for his association with Napoleon Bonaparte, and rose to the top military rank of général de division during the Napoleonic Wars. A fiery commander, often noted for bravery, Dupas was often wounded in action, triggering physical infirmities, which eventually forced him to retire from active service, at first temporarily, in 1809 and then permanently, in late 1813.

== Early career ==
A native of Évian in Savoy, then a part of the Kingdom of Sardinia, the 14-year-old Dupas joined the Sardinian army as a soldier and subsequently joined the Genovese army as a non-commissioned officer.

He joined the Swiss regiment of Château-vieux and at the outbreak of the outbreak of the French Revolution, he was a part of the mob which stormed the Bastille, subsequently joining the Paris National Guards. Quitting his position in the National Guards in April 1791, Dupas was appointed lieutenant colonel in the Gendarmerie legion baptised "The victors of the Bastille".

== The French Revolutionary Wars ==
At the outbreak of the French Revolutionary Wars, Dupas held the rank of adjudant-major of the Allobroges legion, and took part to the annexation of his native Savoy to France and then became aide-de-camp to General Carteaux. He served as aide-de-camp to Carteaux during the Siege of Toulon and during the operations that the French Army of the Eastern Pyrenees conducted against the Kingdom of Spain, until the two countries made peace in 1795.

In 1795, Dupas was commissioned to the French Army of Italy and was noted for bravery at the Battle of Lodi, following which he received an honorary sabre and received several wounds during the subsequent battles. He was then a part of General Bonaparte's French Campaign in Egypt and Syria, with the rank of Chef de bataillon in the Guides, Bonaparte's own personal guard.

Dupas was soon promoted to Chef de brigade and was heroic during the defense of the Cairo citadel in 1800, when he held out with only 200 men under his command. It is during this campaign that Dupas acquired the nickname Le général Z'en avant (General Forward), for his impetuous style of command. Following his return from Egypt, Dupas was appointed Adjutant Supérieur of the Government palace, Colonel of the Mamelukes of the Consular Guard and in 1803 was promoted to Brigadier General.

== The Napoleonic Wars ==
With the outbreak of the War of the Third Coalition, Dupas was given a command in the Grande Armée, leading an epic attack at the Battle of Austerlitz, where his men were instrumental in forcing 5,000 Russians to surrender. For this action, he was promoted to General of Division, before taking part to the War of the Fourth Coalition of 1806-1807, where he was noted above all for his spirited actions at the Battle of Stralsund and Battle of Friedland. He was created a Count of the Empire at the beginning of 1809 and fought at the great Battle of Wagram in July of that year. Dupas was then placed on the retired list, due to the various infirmities that he was suffering from, following his many battle wounds. He was recalled in 1813 for the War of the Sixth Coalition, but was permanently placed on the retired list in November of that year. He retired in Chateau de Ripaille in Thonon-les-Bains where he died on 6 Mar 1823.

The name DUPAS is one of the names inscribed under the Arc de Triomphe in Paris and a statue of the General has been erected in his native Évian. It is shown under column number 26.
