= Hermitage Rooms =

Coordinates: 51°30′39″N 0°07′02″W

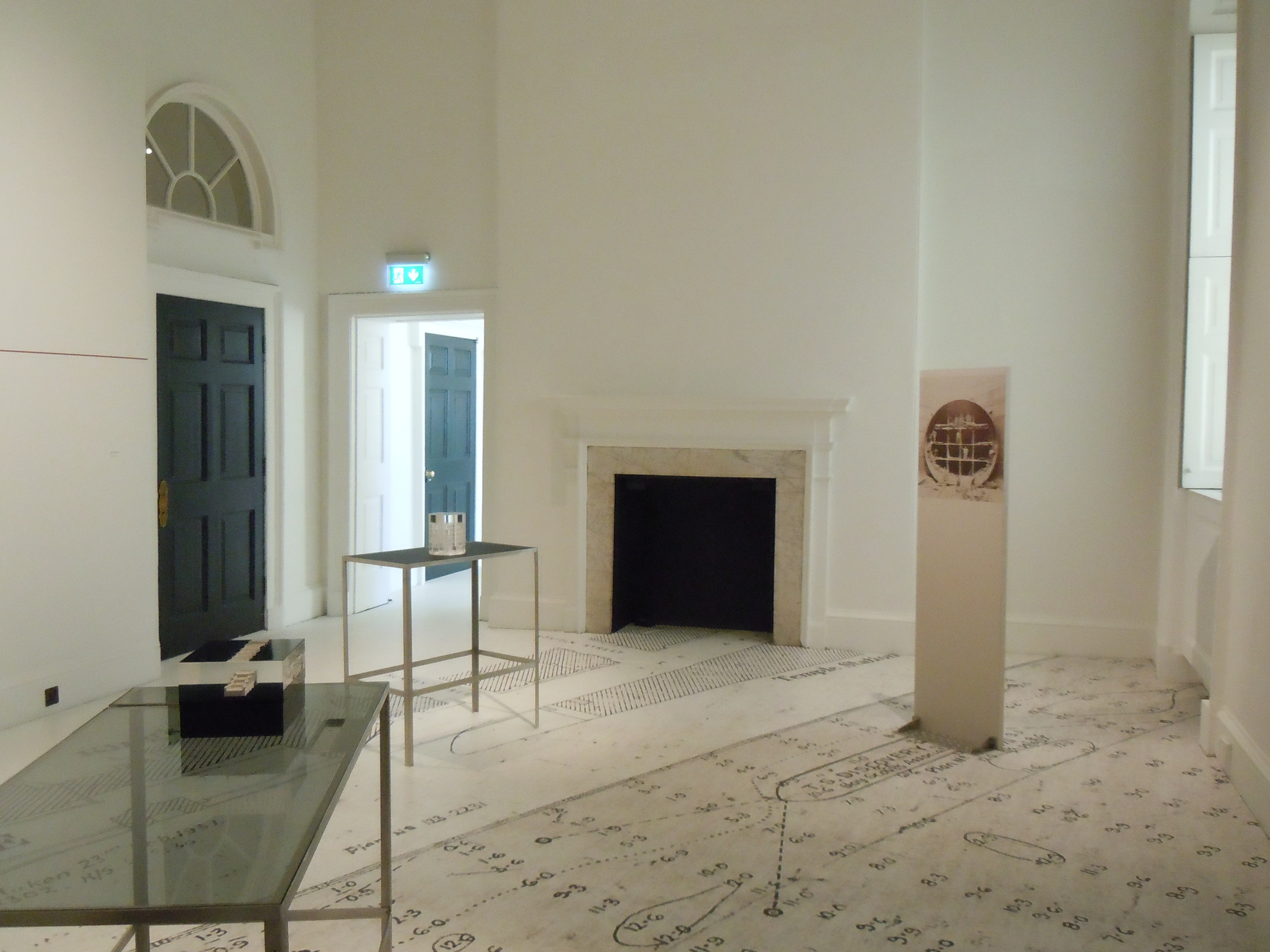
A 2018 temporary exhibition in what were previously known as the Hermitage Rooms

The Hermitage Rooms was the name by which a series of rooms at Somerset House, London, were known from 2000 to 2007. During this period they were used as a venue for temporary exhibitions from the collection of the Hermitage Museum in Saint Petersburg. The partnership with the Hermitage has since ended and the rooms are no longer known by this name, although they continue to house temporary exhibitions.

== History and construction ==
The project was established in the 1990s under the direction of Lord Rothschild, and is funded by individual and corporate donors and admission fees. Several rooms in the south wing of Somerset House were redecorated in a style reminiscent of the interiors of the Winter Palace and opened to the public in November 2000.

In 2003, a new Somerset House Learning Centre opened, which is used in conjunction with the Hermitage Rooms and the other visitor attractions in the building. It was funded from the proceeds of the July 2002 Somerset House gala, An Evening with Elton John. Also in 2003 the Courtauld Institute of Art, housed nearby in the Strand block of Somerset House, assumed responsibility for the Hermitage Rooms.

The first exhibition at the Hermitage Rooms was called Treasures of Catherine the Great. Subsequent exhibitions have featured not only Western painting, but also themes such as photography, ceramics, and Islamic art. In some cases the Hermitage's works have been supplemented by items from other collections, including (as in the case of Peter Paul Rubens: A Touch of Brilliance) from the Courtauld Institute Gallery.

In 2005 the future of the Hermitage Rooms became uncertain after the Hermitage announced its plans to withdraw its loans of artworks overseas. This was the result of an international loan crisis prompted by the seizure in November of paintings belonging to the Pushkin Museum in Moscow as hostages in a trade dispute between a Geneva-based company and the Russian state (owners of both the Hermitage and the Pushkin).

The rooms were closed until June 2007 when a new exhibition was put into place. This ran until November 2007 and was titled "France in Russia: Empress Josephine's Malmaison Collection".

== See also ==
- Courtauld Gallery
