= Alexander Yermolov =

Russian favourite and lover of Catherine the Great

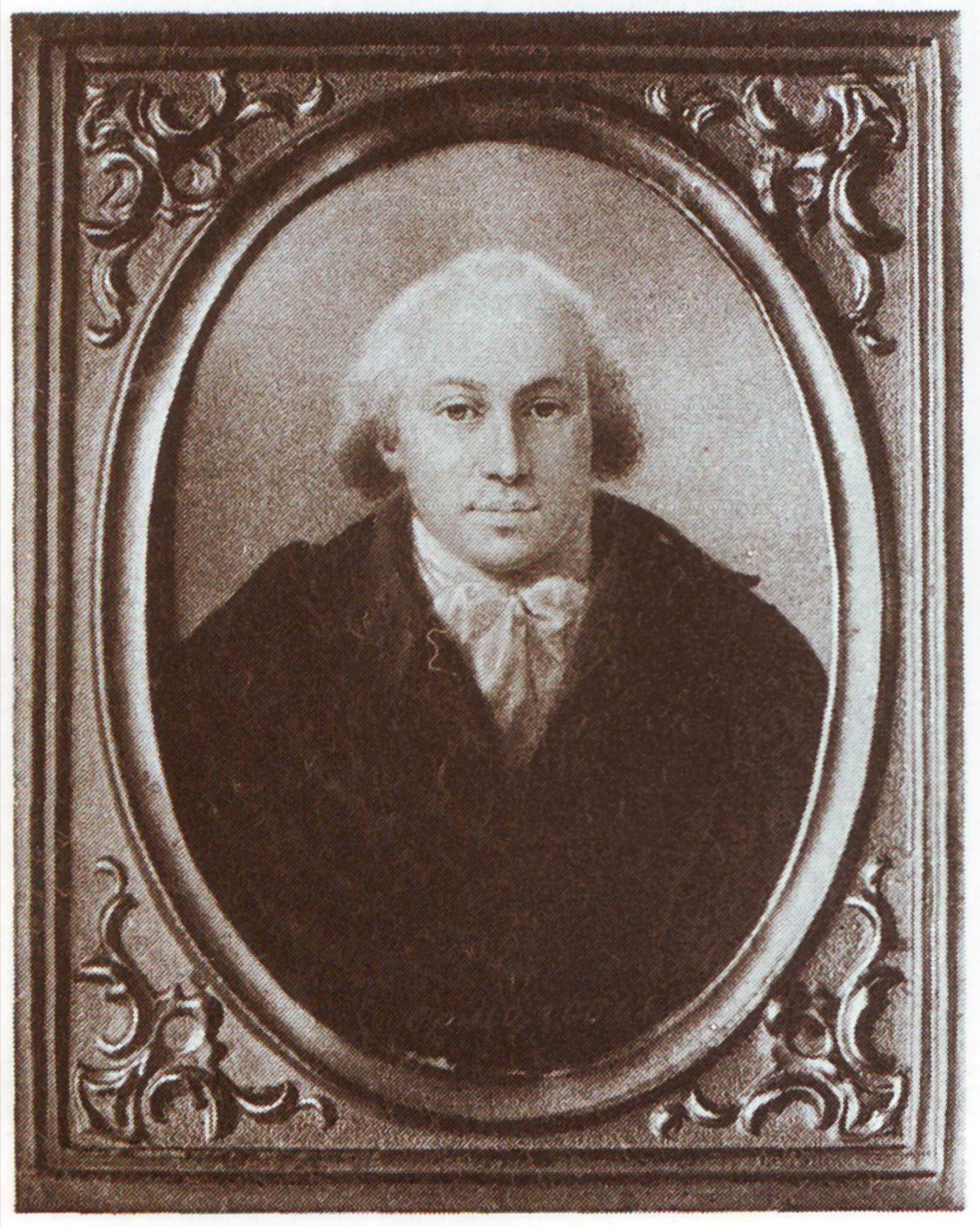

Alexander Petrovich Yermolov (1754–1834) was a Russian favourite and the lover of Catherine the Great from 1785 to 1786.

Yermolov was presented to Catherine by Grigory Potemkin, tested by Anna Protasova and became Catherine's lover in 1785. He collaborated with the enemies of Potemkin and attempted to have Potemkin removed, and thereby lost his position. He went to Paris in the late 1780s and spent the rest of his life in Schloss Frohsdorf.
