= Ivan Korsak =

Ukrainian writer and journalist (1946–2017)

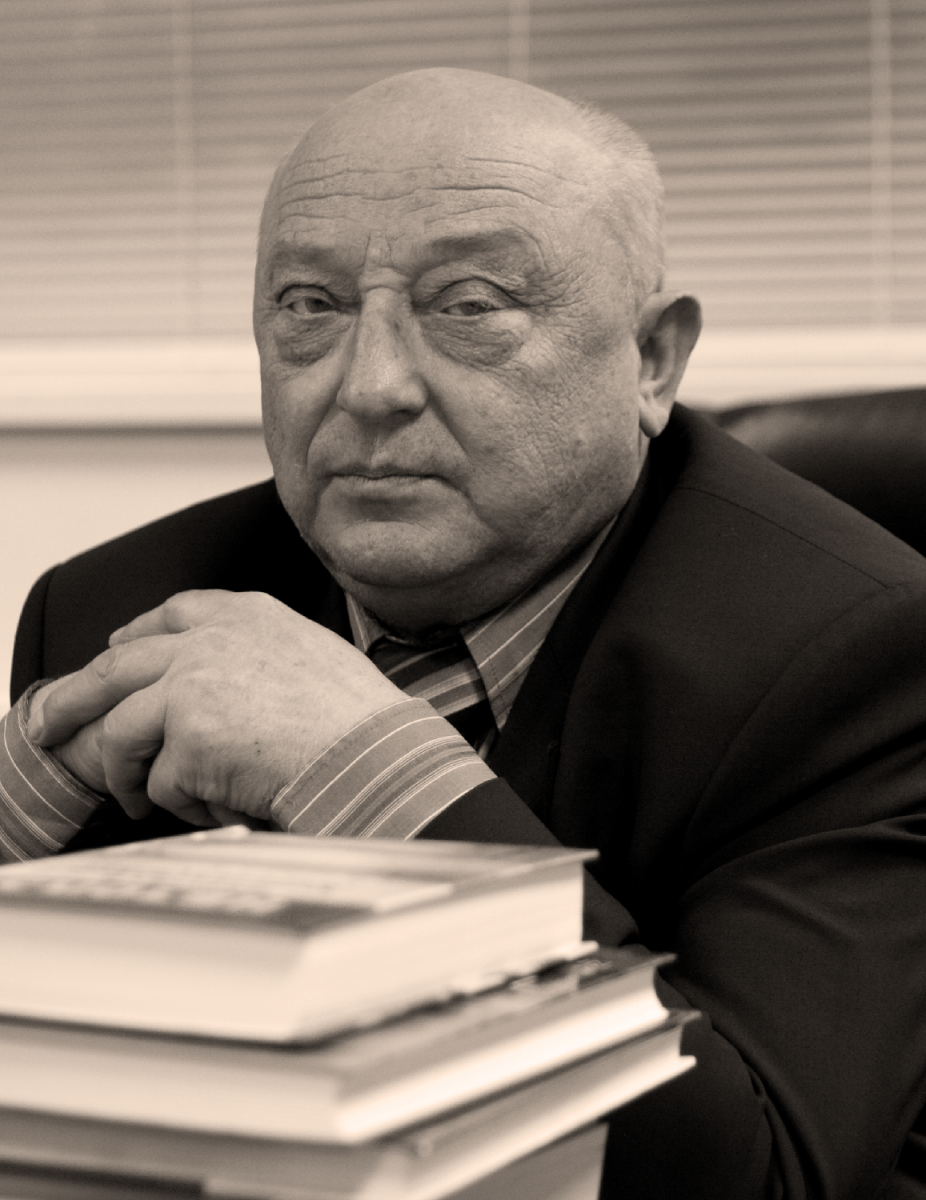
- Born: Ivan Feodosiyovych Korsak; Іван Феодосійович Корсак; 15 September 1946; Zabolottya, Ratne Raion, Volyn Oblast
- Died: 7 December 2017 (aged 71); Lutsk, Volyn Oblast, Ukraine
- Occupations: Writer, poet, journalist
- Writing career
- Genre: Ukrainian literature
- Website: ivankorsak.com

Ivan Feodosiyovych Korsak (Ukrainian: Iва́н Феодо́сійович Ко́рсак; 15 September 1946 – 7 December 2017) was a Ukrainian writer and journalist.

== Biography ==
Ivan Korsak was born on 15 September 1946 in Zabolottia (in the Ratne district of Volyn region). As an undergraduate in college he studied agronomy and journalism. Korsak worked as an editor of the newspaper Radians'ke Polissia in Kamin-Kashyrsky (1975–90), and also for Narodna trybuna in Lutsk (1990–95). In 1996, he became the chief editor of the newspaper Simya i Dim. Korsak has been a member of the National Union of Writers of Ukraine and an editorial board member of the newspaper Literary Ukraine since 2011. Ivan Korsak has been elected Deputy of the Volyn Regional Council three times. He is currently chief editor of the newspaper Simya i Dim.

== Works ==
- BUkLit "Otaman Chaika" – Kyiv: Yaroslaviv Val, 2018
- "Za serpankom, zagadkovym serpankom" – Kyiv: Yaroslaviv Val, 2018
- "Iz korenya dujogo" – Kyiv: Yaroslaviv Val, 2018
- "Na rozstanyah doli" – Kyiv: Yaroslaviv Val, 2017
- "Dzieci Jafeta" – Warszawa, "Pracownia", 2016
- Zapiznile Kohannya Mikluho-Maklaya (Miklouho–Maclay's Late Love) – Kyiv: Yaroslaviv Val, 2016
- Vybuh u Pusteli – Kyiv: Yaroslaviv Val, 2015
- Persten Hanny Barvinok – Kyiv: Yaroslaviv Val, 2015
- Borozna u Chuzhomy Poli – Kyiv: Yaroslaviv Val, 2014
- Myslyvtsi za Marevom – Kyiv: Yaroslaviv Val, 2014
- Na Mezhi – Kyiv: Yaroslaviv Val, 2013
- Zavoyovnyk Yevropy – Kyiv: Yaroslaviv Val, 2012
- Nemyrychiv Kluch – Kyiv: Yaroslaviv Val, 2012
- Karunos Deimanto Paslaptis (Sekrety Korolivskoho Diamanta) – Vilnius: Evhrimas, 2011
- Korona Yuriya II – Kyiv: Yaroslaviv Val, 2011
- Dity Yafeta – Kyiv: Yaroslaviv Val, 2010
- Otaman Chaika – Kyiv: Yaroslaviv Val, 2010
- Kapelan Armiï UNR – Kyiv: Yaroslaviv Val, 2009
- «Tykha Pravda Modesta Levytskoho» – Kyiv: Yaroslaviv Val, 2009
- Tayemnytsya Svyatoho Arseniya – Lutsk: PVD Tverdynya, 2008
- «Imena Tvoyï, Ukraïno» – Lutsk: PVD Tverdynya, 2007
- «Hetmanych Orlyk» – Lutsk: PVD Tverdynya, 2006
- Oksamyt Nezdavnenykh Lit – Lutsk: Volynska Drukarnya, 2000
- Pokruch – Lutsk: Nadstyrya, 1991
- Tini i Polysky – Kyiv: Rad. Pysmennyk, 1990

– These works are mainly on historical subjects.

Ivan Korsak's book Your Names, Ukraine presents stories about Ukrainians who are unknown and not honored in Ukraine. An example is the story "The Knight of the Order of Busto de Libertador," about a Volyn landowner named Mykhailo Skybytsky. In 1823, a romantic Volyn man arrives in Venezuela by way of Sweden and England and becomes a volunteer in the army of Simon Bolivar. In the decisive battle for independence near Ayacucho against the Spanish colonizers, the soldiers under Skybytsky break through, and then achieve victory. For this victory Bolivar personally awards Mykhailo Skybytsky the highest military award, the Order of the Liberator Bust (Busto de Libertador). On his return to Ukraine he is seen as a threat to the Russian Empire, and as a result Guryev, governor of Kyiv, Volyn and Podillya, sends Mykhailo into exile in Vyatka, as directed by the emperor. Later ordered by the Czar to return to the Americas, Skybytsky engineered early plans for the route of the Panama Canal.

The stories from Your Names, Ukraine are based on historical people and events. The author's preface is worth noting: "Type in any Internet search words such as Nobel laureate George Sharpak, and you'll get hundreds of search results, 'the French physicist, born in Poland.' " The Nobelist's real name is Heorhiy Harpak. He was born in Dubrovitsa (Rivne region), and his father was the owner of a brick factory, having supplied materials for many houses throughout the Polissyan part of Volyn and Rivne regions (in modern Ukraine).

Ukrain has produced Kings and prime ministers of other countries, writers of many countries' classical literature, important scientists, and Nobel Prize winners. Ukrainians scattered throughout the world by their fate ("alien mothers, alien fields and glory" – a line from a song written by Ivan Korsak), have made many contributions towards the achievement of world civilization.

On Korsak and his historical themes, Shevchenko Prize winner Vasyl Slapchuk said, "He doesn't just add to his creative body of work, but establishes another step on the ladder of spiritual evolution – the path that every person should master, and therefore the nation as a whole."

Yevhen Sverstiuk, speaking of Your Names, Ukraine said the following: "Ivan Korsak's book brings us back to face personalities in Ukrainian history and culture, those muted or forgotten. And it is a good book. Someone may accuse the author that these sincere stories are focused on a national motive. However, let us recall the motivation of the world famous scientists and mathematicians Mykhailo Ostrohradski, Mykhailo Kravchuk, physicist Ivan Puluj, writer and translator Nikolay Gnedich, and finally Shevchenko and even Mykola Gogol. Did they not emphasize their [Ukrainian] nationality in an environment which would like to blot it out? Because the feeling of national dignity is an important part of human nature and a person's integrity."

Shevchenko Prize winner Mykhaylo Slaboshpytsky said, "Every historical fact for Ivan Korsak is worth its weight in gold. Moreover, Ivan Korsak doesn't tremble over the Cabinet of Curiosities, which contains facts. He knows how to write and can construct an intricate story."

Vitautas Iohela, Doctor of History, a professor from Vilnius, Lithuania, said the following: "The historical adventure novel "KARŪNOS DEIMENTO PASLAPTIS" (Secrets of the Royal Diamond) by Ukrainian writer Ivan Korsak is a good example for our writers and also our readers, an example of how one can easily create a vivid and intriguing story. The author, knowing well the history of his country, introduces readers to it not only by telling the usual adventurous scheme, but he also has the ability to present it within an excellent historical context. The hand of this gifted writer subtly leads us through the battalia of different historical periods. In this novel the reader will feel the historical events of Kyiv Rus and the Great Lithuanian Princedom, as well as the wish of Ukrainians in the early twentieth century, the process of establishing the independent state of Ukraine. So I wish the dear reader a wonderful journey through history in search of a precious stone."

Ivan Korsak's works have been translated into Polish, Russian, Lithuanian, Belarusian, Turkish, and English.

=== Awards and honors ===
- Best Book of Ukraine in the category of prose (for "Explosion in the Desert," 2015)
- Panteleimon Kulish Literary Prize (2013)
- Zoreslav Literary Prize (for "The Crown of Yuriy II," "The Conqueror of Europe," and "The Key of Nemyrych," 2012)
- D. Nytchenko International Prize (2010)
- H. Skovoroda International Prize (2009)
- Gogol International Literary Prize (for "Triumph," 2008)
- Ahatanhel Krymsky Prize (for "Your Names, Ukraine," 2008)
- World of Volynian Books Prize (for "The Mystery of St. Arseniy," 2008)
- Viacheslav Chornovil Prize (for "Hetmanych Orlyk," 2007)
- Order of the Archangel Michael
- Order of St. George the Victorious (two awards)
- Award granted by the Cabinet of Ministers of Ukraine
- Honorary Citizen of Lutsk and Kamin-Kashyrsky
- Medal of the International Club Abai, Kazakhstan, 2018
