= Martin Dudley =

Martin Dudley FSA FRHistS
- Rector of St Bartholomew the Great
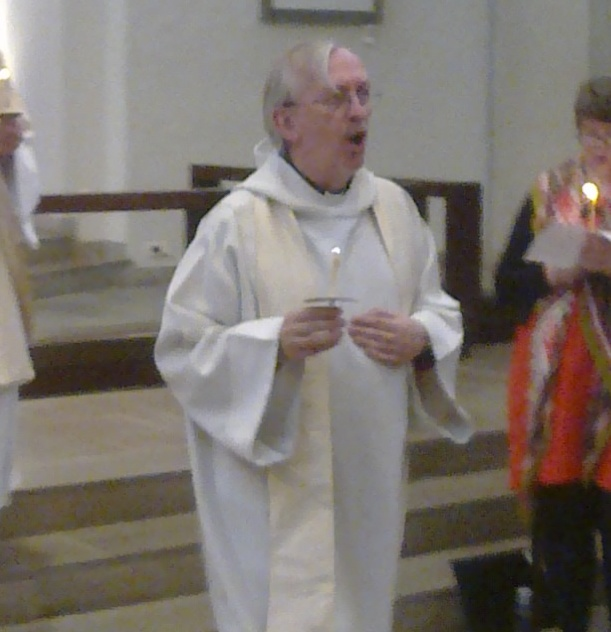
- Dudley in 2015
- Church: Church of England
- Diocese: Diocese of London
- In office: 1995 to 2016

Orders
- Ordination: 1980 (Anglican priest)

Personal details
- Born: Martin Raymond Dudley; 31 May 1953 (age 73) Birmingham, England
- Denomination: Eastern Orthodox Church (formerly Anglicanism)
- Education: King Edward's School, Birmingham
- Alma mater: King's College London; St Michael's College, Llandaff

Martin Raymond Dudley FSA FRHistS (born 31 May 1953) is a former clergyman and author. A former Anglican priest, he served as a City of London common councilman and authored books about the Christian Church.

Until 31 December 2016, he was incumbent of the combined benefices of St Bartholomew in the City of London, known as the Parish of Great St Bartholomew, having been rector of St Bartholomew the Great since 1995 and priest in charge of St Bartholomew the Less since 2012.

== Early life and education ==
Dudley was born in Birmingham where he attended King Edward’s School. After a year training at the Royal Military Academy Sandhurst, he returned to the Midlands to work for a travel company.

In 1974, Dudley studied theology at King's College London, graduating with Bachelor of Divinity and Master of Theology degrees. He studied for the priesthood at St Michael's College, Llandaff.

Dudley received a PhD from the University of London (King's College, London) in 1994 and an MSc in voluntary sector management at the Cass Business School in 2006.

== Ordained ministry ==
Dudley was ordained as a deacon in 1979 and a priest in 1980 at Llandaff Cathedral. After a curacy in Whitchurch, Cardiff, he became vicar of Weston, Hertfordshire in 1983 before being appointed vicar of Owlsmoor, Berkshire (1988–95), where he oversaw the building of a new parish church.

On 9 September 1995, he became Rector of St Bartholomew the Great in the Diocese of London. and in 2012, he also became priest in charge of St Bartholomew the Less. On 1 June 2015, the two parishes became a united benefice and Dudley became Rector of the new parish.

On 31 December 2016, Dudley retired as Rector of Great St Bartholomew, with plans to become an "active priest who is also an independent scholar and writer". During his Anglican ministry, he tended to the Anglo-Catholic wing of the Church of England.

=== Civil partnership blessing controversy ===
In 2008 Dudley blessed the statutory civil partnership of two Anglican priests, for which he received a public rebuke from Richard Chartres, Bishop of London. In Riazat Butt’s Guardian profile, the late Colin Slee, Dean of Southwark, said that "he [Dudley] is very bright. He is a very consistent person in that he knows his own mind and doesn't mind if everyone else disagrees with him. He is very intelligent and prepared to take a stand for something he believes in, even if it's not going with the mainstream." Dudley justified his actions in an article in the New Statesman magazine.

== Orthodoxy ==
In March 2018, Dudley was received into the Russian Orthodox Church as a layman.

== Other work ==
In 1996, Dudley was admitted to the Freedom of the City of London and is a liveryman of the Worshipful Company of Farriers. Between 2002-2027 Dudley was elected to the City Court of Common Council representing Aldersgate Ward. He served on committees, was a governor of the Museum of London and trustee of the Trust for London (formerly the City Parochial Foundation).

== Personal life ==
Dudley married Paula Jones, a chiropodist, in 1976; they have two sons.

== Honours ==
On 23 October 1997, Dudley was elected a Fellow of the Society of Antiquaries of London (FSA). He is also a Fellow of the Royal Historical Society (FRHistS). He is a liveryman of the Worshipful Company of Farriers, an honorary liveryman of the Worshipful Company of Hackney Carriage Drivers and an honorary freeman of the Worshipful Company of Farmers. He is a past master of the Guild of Public Relations Practitioners. He received an honorary Doctor of Arts degree from City University in 2014.

== Publications ==
- jtly, with; Rowell, Canon Geoffrey, eds. (1990). Confession and Absolution. SPCK Publishing. ISBN 9780281044429. (qv: Geoffrey Rowell, formerly Bishop of Europe)
- jtly, with; Rowell, Canon Geoffrey, eds. (1993). The oil of gladness: anointing in the Christian tradition. SPCK Publishing. ISBN 9780281046454.
- The Collect in Anglican Liturgy: Texts and Sources, 1549-1989 (Alcuin Club Collection). Liturgical Press. 1994. ISBN 9780814623084.
- Like a Two-Edged-Sword: the Word of God in Liturgy and History; essays in honour of Canon Donald Gray. Norwich: The Canterbury Press. 1995. ISBN 9781853111150.
- A Manual for Ministry to the Sick. SPCK Publishing. 1997. ISBN 9780281049035.
- Saint Bartholomew the Great Priory Church. Jarrold Publishing. 1999.
- Ashes to Glory: Meditations for Lent, Holy Week and Easter. SPCK Publishing. 1999. ISBN 9780281052479.
- A Herald Voice: The Work of God in Advent and Christmas. SPCK Publishing. 2000. ISBN 9780281052806.
- Risen, Ascended, Glorified: Meditations for the Days from Easter to Trinity. SPCK Publishing. 2002. ISBN 9780281053872.
- Crowning the Year: Autumn in Christian Tradition. SPCK Publishing. 2003. ISBN 9780281055234.
- jtly, with; Rounding, Virginia (2003). Churchwardens: a Survival Guide. The Office and Role of Churchwardens of the Twenty-First Century. SPCK Publishing. ISBN 9780281050734.
- jtly, with; Rounding, Virginia (2004). The Parish Survival Guide. SPCK Publishing. ISBN 9780281056651.
- jtly, with; Rounding, Virginia (2006). Serving the Parish. SPCK Publishing. ISBN 9780281057184.
- Being orthodox: faith and practice in Eastern Orthodoxy. London: SPCK. 18 July 2019. ISBN 9780281082292.
