= Schloss Frohsdorf =

Building in Lanzenkirchen, Austria

Coordinates: 47°44′43″N 16°15′16″E

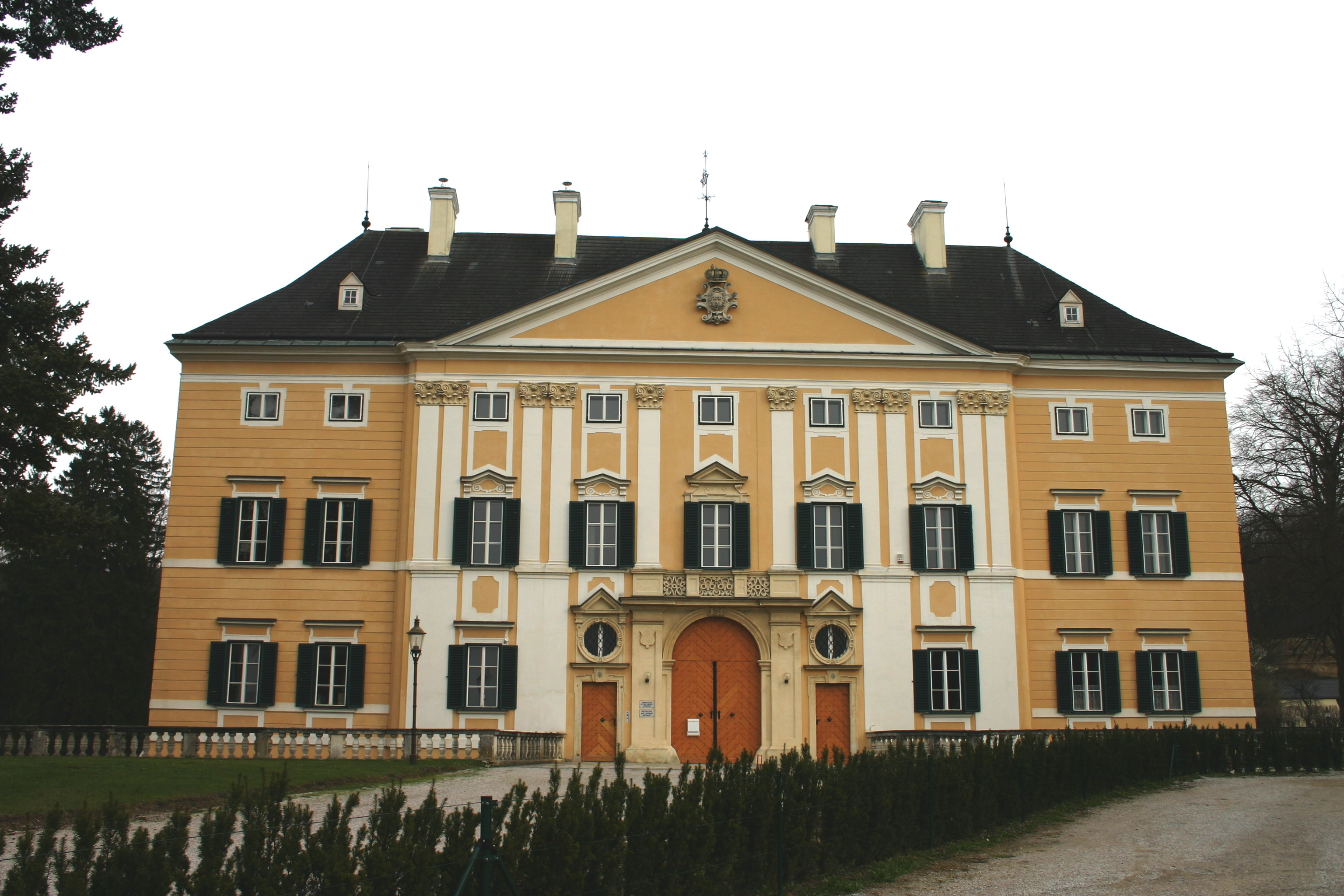
Schloss Frohsdorf

Schloss Frohsdorf is a castle-like complex in Lanzenkirchen in Niederösterreich and was built in 1547–50 out of the ruins of the so-called "Krotenhof".

After similar devastation in the year 1683 it was largely altered and renovated in the style of Baroque architecture. Greatly damaged by the Second World War, the palace was restored between 1968 and 1971 by the Austrian postal service.

== Chronology ==
- from 1570 Teufel family
- from 1690 Count Franz Carl Hoyos (renovated by Johann Bernhard Fischer von Erlach)
- from 1740 Count Joseph Philipp Hoyos
- from 1781 Count Johann Philipp Hoyos and his wife, Countess Maria Christiana von Clary
- from 1799 Count Johann Ernest Hoyos (son of Count Johann Philipp Hoyos)
- from 1817 Caroline Bonaparte (youngest sister of Napoleon) and General Francesco Macdonald (very expensive sale)
- from 1828 Alexander Yermolov (Russian former lover of Catherine the Great)
- from 1835 Mikhail Yermolov
- from 1839 Pierre Louis Jean Casimir de Blacas, 1st Duke of Blacas (bought)
- from 1844 Marie Thérèse of France, daughter of Louis XVI
- from 1851 Henri, Count of Chambord (nephew-in-law of Marie-Thérèse of France)
- from 1886 Jaime, Duke of Anjou and Madrid (great nephew of the comte de Chambord)
- from 1931 Princess Beatrice of Bourbon, Princess Massimo (sister of the Duke of Anjou and Madrid)
- from 1941 Sale of the palace to the Deutsche Reichspost
- from 1945 Russian troops occupy palace
- from 1955 takeover of the Austrian postal service
- from 1955 the estate (without the castle) was inherited by Blanca Wurmbrand-Stuppach née Massimo
- from 1968 renovation by the Austrian postal service
