= Anna Protasova =

Russian noblewoman and lady-in-waiting (1745–1826)

Anna Stepanovna Protasova
- Countess
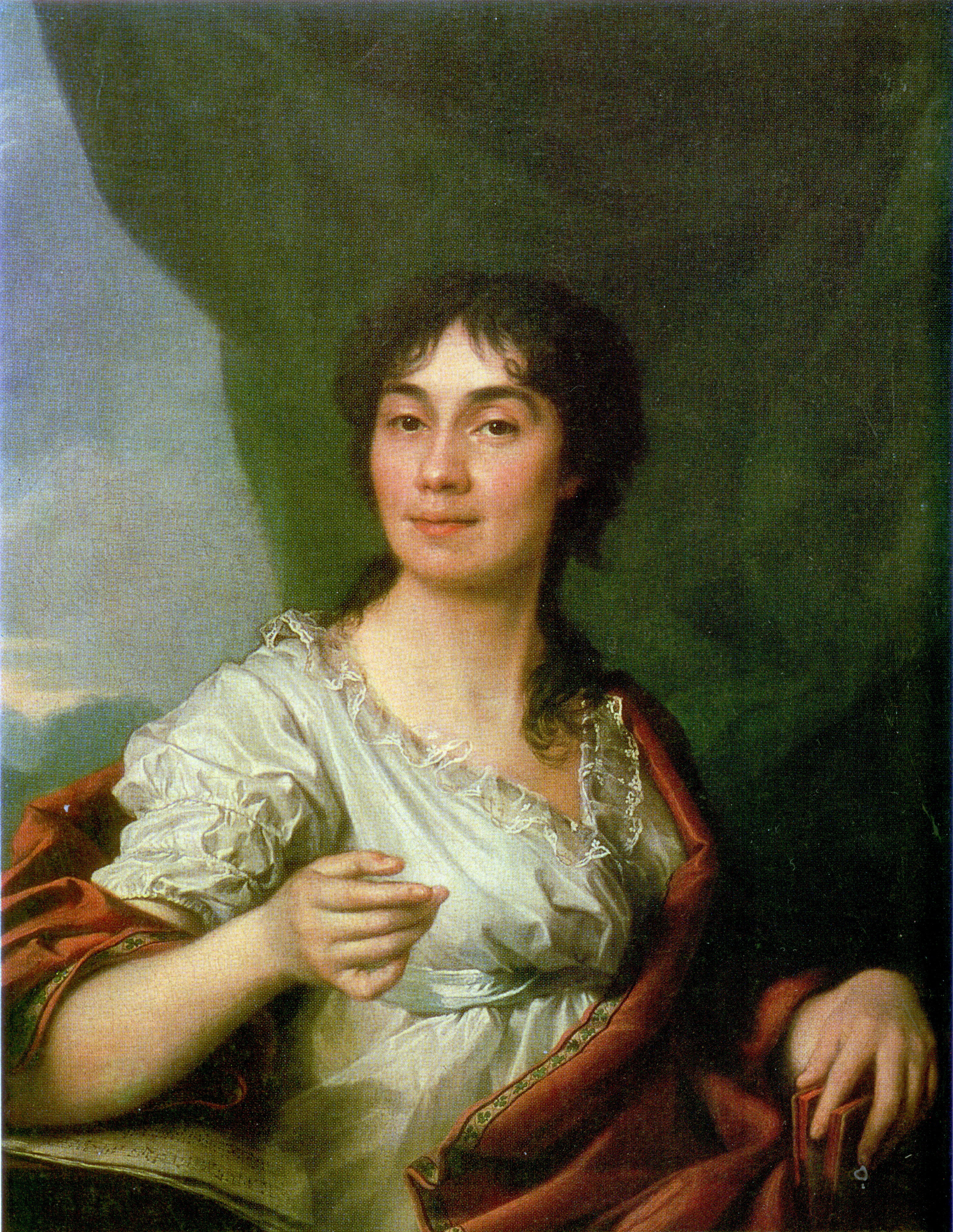
- Portrait by Dmitry Levitzky (c. 1800)
- Known for: Confidant of Catherine II
- Born: 1745
- Died: 1826 (aged 80–81); St. Petersburg
- Father: Stepan Feodorovich Protasov
- Mother: Anisya Nikitishna, née Orlova

Countess Anna Stepanovna Protasova (Russian: Анна Степановна Протасова; 1745–1826) was a Russian lady-in-waiting and noblewoman who was a confidant of Catherine the Great.

== Biography ==
Protasova was the daughter of Senator Stephan Feodorovich Protasov and Anisya Nikitishna, née Orlova, and the cousin of Alexej Orlov with whom she is reported to have had a relationship. She was entrusted with the upbringing of a certain young lady 'Alekseeva' who was rumoured to be the daughter of the Empress by Grigory Orlov, though it is not clear if this was Natalia Alexandrovna or Elizaveta Alexandrovna Alekseeva. Protasova replaced Countess Praskovya Bruce as Catherine's confidante and first maid-of-honour in 1779 and became lady-in-waiting in 1785. She was later entrusted with the supervision of all other ladies-in-waiting.

Protasova was entrusted by Catherine with her most intimate personal affairs, becoming best known as l'éprouveuse for the role that she is supposed to have played in Catherine's love life. According to legend, she was to "test" the prospective lovers sexually before they became Catherine's lovers after they had been suggested by Potemkin, chosen by Catherine and examined by a doctor for venereal disease. The same role has been attributed without confirmation to her predecessor as lady-in-waiting, Praskovya Bruce.

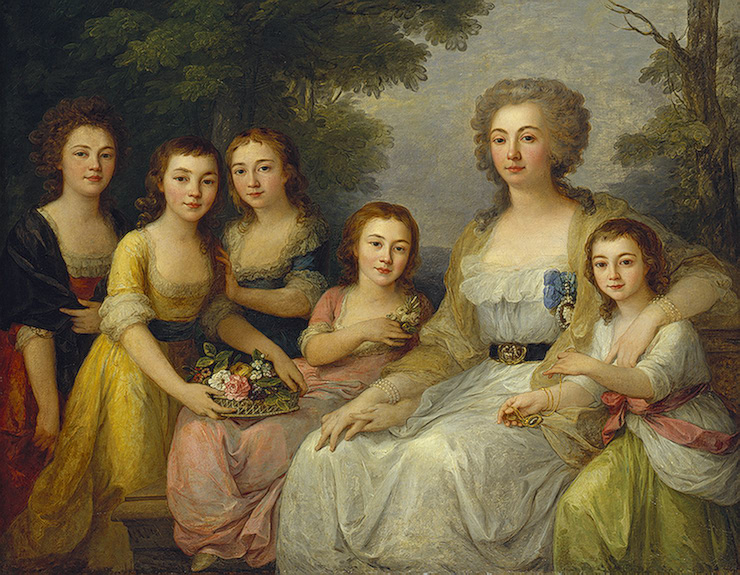
Kauffman's group portrait

Protasova accompanied Catherine on all of her journeys. Protasova is mentioned as l'éprouveuse in the poems of Byron. She and her nieces were also painted by Angelica Kauffman in 1788, based on six sketches sent to her in Rome by Prince Nikolay Yusupov—in her journal of orders, she admitted that she did not know if the commission came from Yusupov or Catherine herself. The painting entered the Hermitage Museum sometime between 1788 and its being mentioned in an inventory in 1797, whilst on 1 January 1792 it was engraved by James Walker.

In 1801, Protasova was given the title of countess, and she remained lady-in-waiting to Empress Dowager Maria Feodorovna. Protasova died in St. Petersburg.

== Sources ==
- Simon Sebag-Montefiore : Potemkin och Katarina den stora (2005)
- Marie Tetzlaff : Katarina den stora (1998)
