= Claude-Étienne Michel =

French army officer

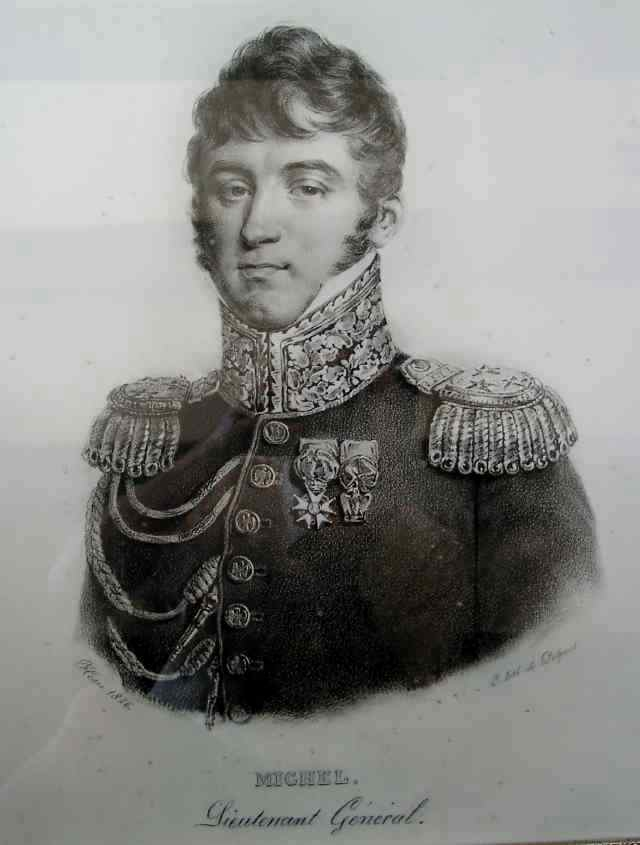
Claude-Étienne Michel

General Claude-Étienne Michel (3 October 1772 – 18 June 1815), an officer in Napoleon's army, eventually rose to second in command of the Chasseur Division of the Imperial Guard and commander of the Brigade of the Middle Guard. He may actually be the officer who uttered the words often attributed to Pierre Cambronne "La Garde meurt et ne se rend pas" (The Guard dies, and does not surrender).

== Life ==
Michel was born in Pointre in the Jura, the son of a surgeon.

== Revolutionary Wars ==
During the French Revolution and the surrounding War of the First Coalition he enlisted in the '6th battalion of volunteers from the Jura department' on 1 October 1791. He was a Sergeant Major by the 15th of the month and promoted to Sous-Lieutenant on March 4, 1792. then Lieutenant on the 22 August 1792, and was made a Captain on October 6, 1792, a rapid rise in a year. During this year he was deployed on the borders of Switzerland; The 6th Jura Volunteers were moved to the army of the Rhine and Michel was taken prisoner by the Prussians on March 5, 1793, at Rheindürkheim.

Michel was held for over two years and finally exchanged in June 1795. Meanwhile, the 6th Jura Volunteers along with the old Royal Army's 2nd Battalion of the 96th Regiment and 1st Haute-Vienne volunteers was formed into the 174th Demi-Brigade in October 1793 during a major overhaul of the revolutionary armies fusing older royal units with the volunteer battalions in mixed regiment sized units. Michel joined this new unit which was attached to the Army of Sambre and Meuse. Soon promoted again to Chef-de-Bataillon on October 1, 1795. The Demi-Brigade was then merged with the 93rd Demi-Brigade to become a new 49th Demi-Brigade in 1796, in a second major shake up of the French infantry, and assigned to the new Army of Germany when it is formed from the armies of 'Sambre and Meuse' and 'Rhine and Moselle' in 1797.

Michel and the 49th Demi-Brigade was then part of the Gallo-Batavian army assembled in the Batavian Republic and took part in the rushed 1798 expedition to Ireland but was captured at sea aboard La Furie and exchanged by the British at the end of the year.

The Gallo-Batavian army provided much opportunity of action due to a combined British and Russian invasion of the republic in the War of the Second Coalition and he fought at Schoorldam, holding his positions at the end of the day, being slightly wounded towards the close of the battle. When the fighting renewed he had his right arm broken by a shot. The Gallo-Batavian army having succeeded in forcing the British/Russian forces to withdraw was moved into Germany in support of the fighting against Austria and Michel had recovered enough distinguish himself at the head of his battalion in the fighting at Burgeberach north of Nuremberg and was there shot in the other arm. This battle along with the larger Hohenlinden broke the Austrians and ended the war. The 49th Demi-Brigade is attached to the 'Army of England' and moved to quarters around Cherbourg.

== Consulate and Empire ==
During the consulate, with the temporary peace in Europe, France took stock of its colonial holdings. Michel was selected to join the disastrous expedition to Saint-Domingue, in 1802, to attempt to reassert French control over the colony. He returned to France in 1803, one of the few survivors, joining the new 40th Regiment of the Line, there had been yet another reorganisation of the infantry and his old unit the 49th Demi-Brigade had been amalgamated with the 24th Demi-Brigade to form a new larger 24th Regiment in his absence. He was further promoted to Major, and so second in command, of the 40th Regiment of the Line on 22 November 1803. Then on March 25, 1804, he was made a member of the Légion d'Honneur.

The 40th was part of the 3rd Division of Lannes' V Corps of the Grande Armée during the War of the Third Coalition and Michel's services at the battle of Austerlitz earned him, on December 27, 1805, the rank of Colonel and his admission, and transfer to, the 1st Regiment of Grenadiers of the Imperial Guard, on 1 May 1806. He took up the post of Major in the 1st Grenadiers as everyone serving in the Guard was considered to be a rank above those in the line infantry.

In March 1806 he married Margaret Maret (1784–1875) who was the daughter of Count Jean Philibert Maret, a politician and soon to be appointed to the army Commissariat, and niece of Hugues-Bernard Maret one of the Emperor Napoleon's secretaries.

He was promoted to Colonel of the 1st Grenadiers of the Guard, on February 16, 1807, in recognition of his conduct at the Battle of Jena-Auerstedt where unused the Guard and Battle of Eylau where they were played a vital role. He fought at the Battle of Friedland again held in reserve, and left for Spain after the Treaty of Tilsit ended the war with Russia and Prussia, shattering the Third Coalition.

In the Peninsular War, He fought in the Siege of Burgos on November 10, 1808, and was awarded Officier de la Légion d'Honneur for displaying great valour and the title of 'Baron of the Empire'.

Michel was recalled from Spain to the Grande Armée in 1809, and was present at the battles Battle of Eckmühl, Battle of Aspern-Essling and Battle of Wagram. He was appointed Général d'Brigade on June 24, 1811, and fought in the campaign of 1812 in Russian. Again surviving the disastrous destruction of an expedition he returned to France. In 1813 Imperial France was fighting invasions on several fronts, Michel fought in Saxony as part of the German Campaign of 1813 and was elevated again in the Légion d'Honneur to Commandeur de la Légion d'Honneur on April 6, was admitted to the Order of the Iron Crown on August 16 and finally promoted to Général de division on November 20.

In 1814 Michel was in command of the 2nd Old Guard Division during the Six Days' Campaign and by early February in the fighting around Troyes as a prelude to the main campaign, was hunting for the Allied vanguard commanded by the Prince of Lichtenstein. Supported by the dragoons of General André Briche, he surprised the allies at St. Theobald, and despite the greater numbers available to them, pushed them south to St. Parres les Vaudes, away from Troyes. The main events of the Six Day's ended for Michel when he was again shot in the arm on February 11 at Battle of Montmirail although he saw out the day, leading a counterattack that pushed back the Prussians. He was still bedridden as a result of this injury, when the Allied armies approached Paris. At the noise of war, the General forgot his wound and reappeared, his arm in a sling, on March 30 before the walls of the capital. Placed in command of a division of conscripts during the battle he was again wounded, by grapeshot in the kidneys. However the fighting was in vain as Paris surrendered the following day and Napoleon was forced into abdication.

== Restoration ==
Upon the restoration in common with many officers of the Empire he was accepted into the service of the King and Louis XVIII named him as a Knight of the Order of Saint Louis on August 20, 1814, and granted him a commission of Colonel in the Royal Guard.

== Hundred Days ==
Again in common with many officers and men of the army he defected back to Napoleon upon his return from Elba. The Emperor raised him to Count of the Empire, and appointed him initially as commander of the 1st Chasseurs à Pied of the Old Guard. As part of the Armée du Nord he was placed as second in command of the Chasseur Division of the Guard.

At the Battle of Waterloo on June 18, Michel was part of the final assault on La Haye Sainte personally leading the 1st/3rd Chasseurs. They mounted the ridge and were met by intense fire from the British Foot Guards. This attack, which caused heavy losses in the ranks, was also fatal to General Michel. His body was not recovered and is buried with his comrades on the battle field. His name is engraved on column 10 of the northern pillar of the Arc de Triomphe.

== Notes and Links ==
- http://www.napoleon-series.org/military/organization/frenchguard/c_guardinf1.html
- https://web.archive.org/web/20110813112947/http://chasseurs.ru/regiment.html
- Mullié, Charles (1852). "Michel (Claude-Étienne, comte)" . Biographie des célébrités militaires des armées de terre et de mer de 1789 à 1850 (in French). Paris: Poignavant et Compagnie.
