= Young Guard (Napoleonic) =

Military unit

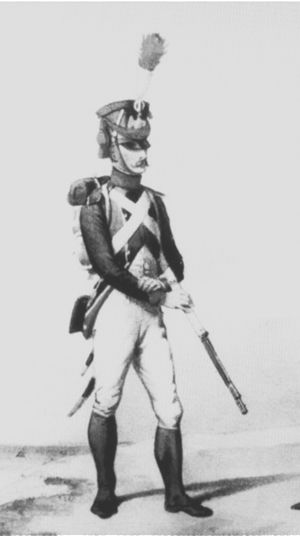
Tirailleur of the Young Guard.

The Young Guard was the collective name for Imperial Guard units raised after 1809, to distinguish them from the Old Guard and Middle Guard. Its cadre was raised from the Old Guard, but most of its recruits were instead the strongest and best educated conscripts from that era.

== History ==
It was created by decree on 16 January 1809 with the creation of two tirailleur regiments, one attached to the Guard grenadiers and one to the Guard chasseurs.

During the Allied invasion of France the Young Guard consisted of 16 tirailleur regiments, 16 voltigeur regiments, a flanker-grenadier regiment, a flanker-chasseur regiment and the Guard pupil regiment. It had a theoretical strength of 90,000 but an actual one of only around 38,000.

== Order of battle ==
=== Raised 1809-1810 ===
- 1st Tirailleur-Chasseur Regiment and 1st Tirailleur-Grenadier Regiment of the Imperial Guard (16/01/1809-30/12/1810)
- 2nd Tirailleur-Grenadier Regiment of the Imperial Guard
- 1st and 2nd Conscript-Grenadier Regiments of the Imperial Guard
- 2nd Tirailleur-Chasseur Regiment of the Imperial Guard
- 1st and 2nd Conscript-Chasseur Regiments of the Imperial Guard

=== Raised 1810 ===
- 1st to 4th Tirailleur Regiments of the Imperial Guard
- 1st to 4th Voltigeur Regiments of the Imperial Guard

=== Raised 1811 ===
- 5th and 6th Tirailleur Regiments of the Imperial Guard
- 5th and 6th Voltigeur Regiments of the Imperial Guard

=== Raised 1813 ===
- 7th to 13th Tirailleur Regiments of the Imperial Guard
- 7th to 13th Voltigeur Regiments of the Imperial Guard

=== Raised 1814 ===
- 14th to 16th Tirailleur Regiments of the Imperial Guard
- 14th to 16th Voltigeur Regiments of the Imperial Guard

== Bibliography ==
- (in French) Pigeard, Alain (2002). "Jeune Garde (Garde impériale)". Dictionnaire de la Grande Armée. Tallandier. ISBN 2847340092.
