= Pierre Cambronne =

French general (1770–1842)

Brigadier General Pierre Jacques Étienne Cambronne Viscount Cambronne
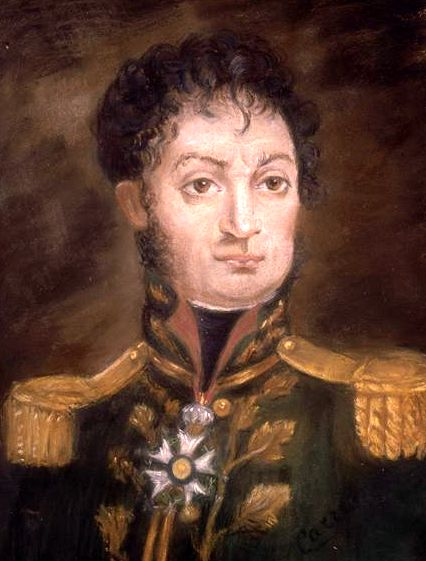
- Portrait of Cambronne, 1815
- Born: 26 December 1770; Nantes, France
- Died: 29 January 1842 (aged 71); Nantes, France
- Military career
- Allegiance: French First Republic; First French Empire; Kingdom of France
- Branch: French Army
- Service years: 1792–1823
- Rank: Brigadier General
- Conflicts: French Revolutionary Wars; Napoleonic Wars
- Awards: Officer of the Legion of Honour

Pierre Jacques Étienne, 1st Viscount Cambronne (English: /kæmˈbrɒn/ cam-BRON, French: [pjɛʁ ʒak etjɛn kɑ̃bʁɔn]; 26 December 1770 – 29 January 1842), was a general of the First French Empire. He was wounded at the Battle of Waterloo.

== Military career ==
Cambronne was born in Saint-Sébastien-sur-Loire, a commune near Nantes, in the modern department of Loire-Atlantique. He joined the Grenadiers as a volunteer in 1792, serving under Charles François Dumouriez in what would become Belgium, in the Vendée, took part in the battle of Quiberon, then in the expedition to Ireland under Hoche in 1796. He then joined the Army of the Alps under André Masséna, where he was promoted to command a grenadier company at the Battle of Zurich (1799).

In 1800, he commanded a company under Latour d'Auvergne, and later succeeded him as First Grenadier of France. He was made a Colonel at the Battle of Jena in 1806, given command of the 3rd Regiment of the Voltigeurs of the Guard in 1810, and was made a Baron the same year. (Voltigeur, a French word meaning vaulter or leaper, was a designation given to elite light infantry units in the French Army, who acted as advance units of the main column.)

Cambronne then fought in Spain, then joined La Grande Armée. In Russia he commanded the 3rd Regiment of Voltigeurs of the Guard, and took part in the battles of Bautzen, Dresden, and Leipzig, before being promoted to General.

== The hundred days and Waterloo ==
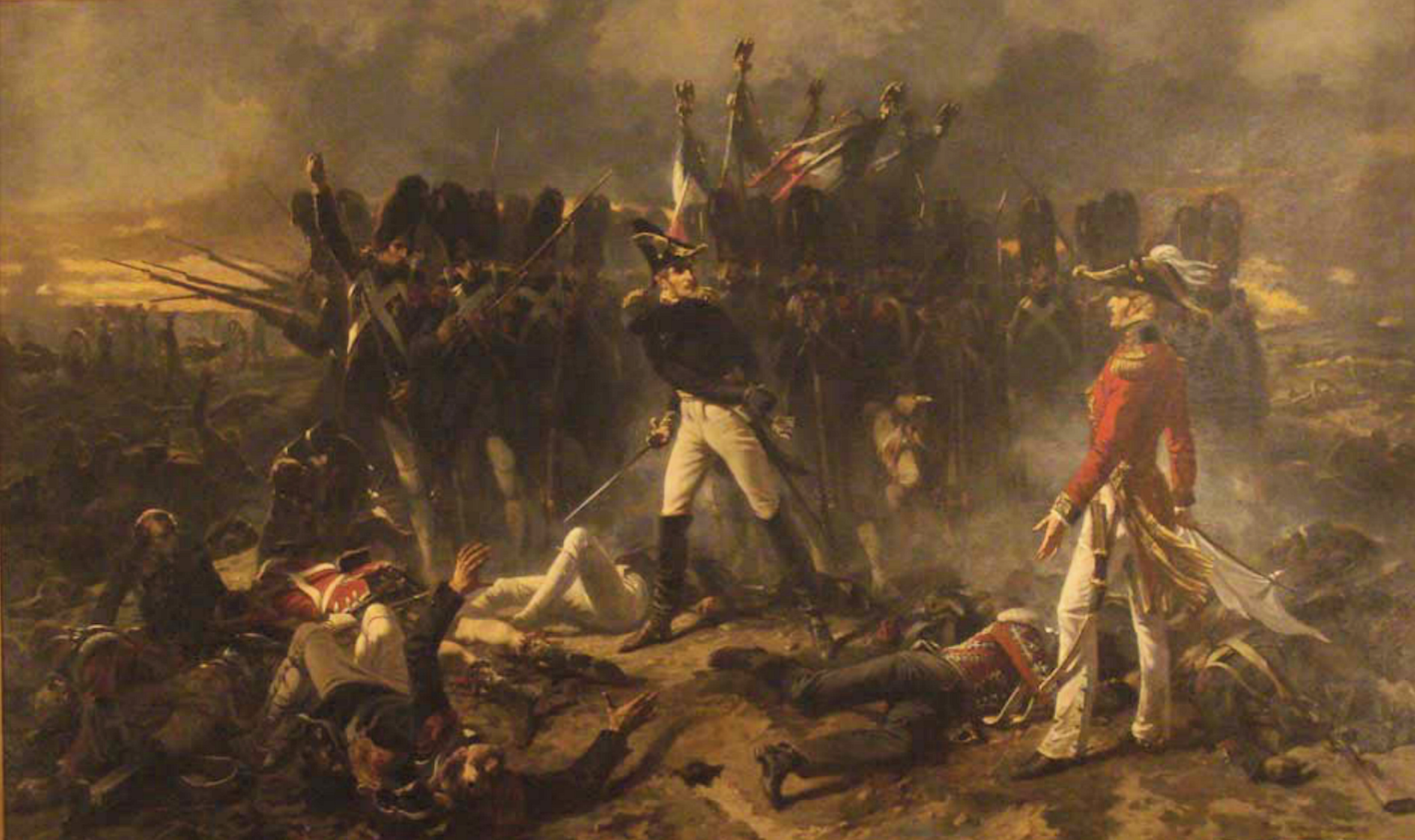
Cambronne à Waterloo, Charles-Édouard Armand-Dumaresq (1826-1895)

He became major of the Imperial Guard in 1814, and accompanied Napoleon into exile to the island of Elba, where he was a military commander. He then returned with Napoléon to France on 1 March 1815 for the Hundred Days, capturing the fortress of Sisteron (5 March), and was made a Count by Napoléon when they arrived at Paris. Cambronne was seriously wounded at the Battle of Waterloo and was taken prisoner by the British. He subsequently married the nurse who cared for him.

The exact circumstances of his surrender to the British are disputed. At the battle's conclusion, Cambronne was commanding the last carré (section) of the Old Guard when General Colville called on him to surrender. According to a journalist named Rougement, Cambronne replied: "La garde meurt mais ne se rend pas!" ("The Guard dies but does not surrender!"). These words were often repeated and put on the base of a statue of Cambronne in Nantes after his death.

Other sources reported that Colville insisted and ultimately Cambronne replied with one word: "Merde!" (literally, "Shit!", figuratively, "Go to hell!") This version of the reply became famous in its own right, becoming known as le mot de Cambronne ("the word of Cambronne") and repeated in Victor Hugo's account of Waterloo in his novel Les Misérables and in Edmond Rostand's play L'Aiglon. The name Cambronne was later used as a polite euphemism ("What a load of old Cambronne!") and sometimes even as a verb, "cambronniser".

Cambronne always denied both Rougement's account and the one-word response, stating that he could not have said such a thing and remained alive. A series of letters to The Times claimed that British Colonel Hugh Halkett, commanding the 3rd Hanoverian Brigade, captured Cambronne before he made any reply.

"The Guard dies ..." statement has also been ascribed to General Claude-Étienne Michel. In July 1845 the sons of General Michel requested a royal decree stating that the words attributed to General Cambronne had in fact been said by their father, producing a number of witnesses and published historical works as evidence. The attribution was left undecided.

== Further career ==
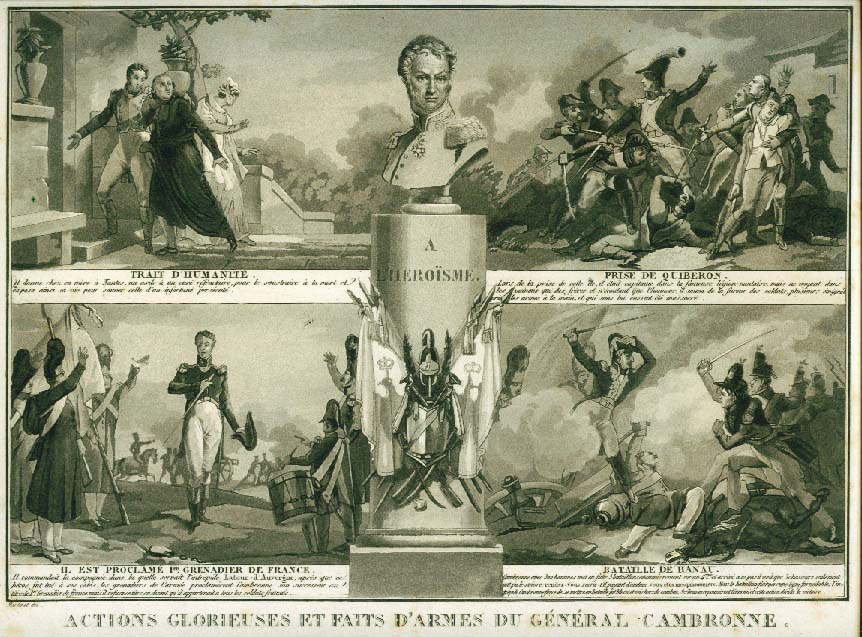
Popular image of the 1820s illustrating the deeds of General Cambronne

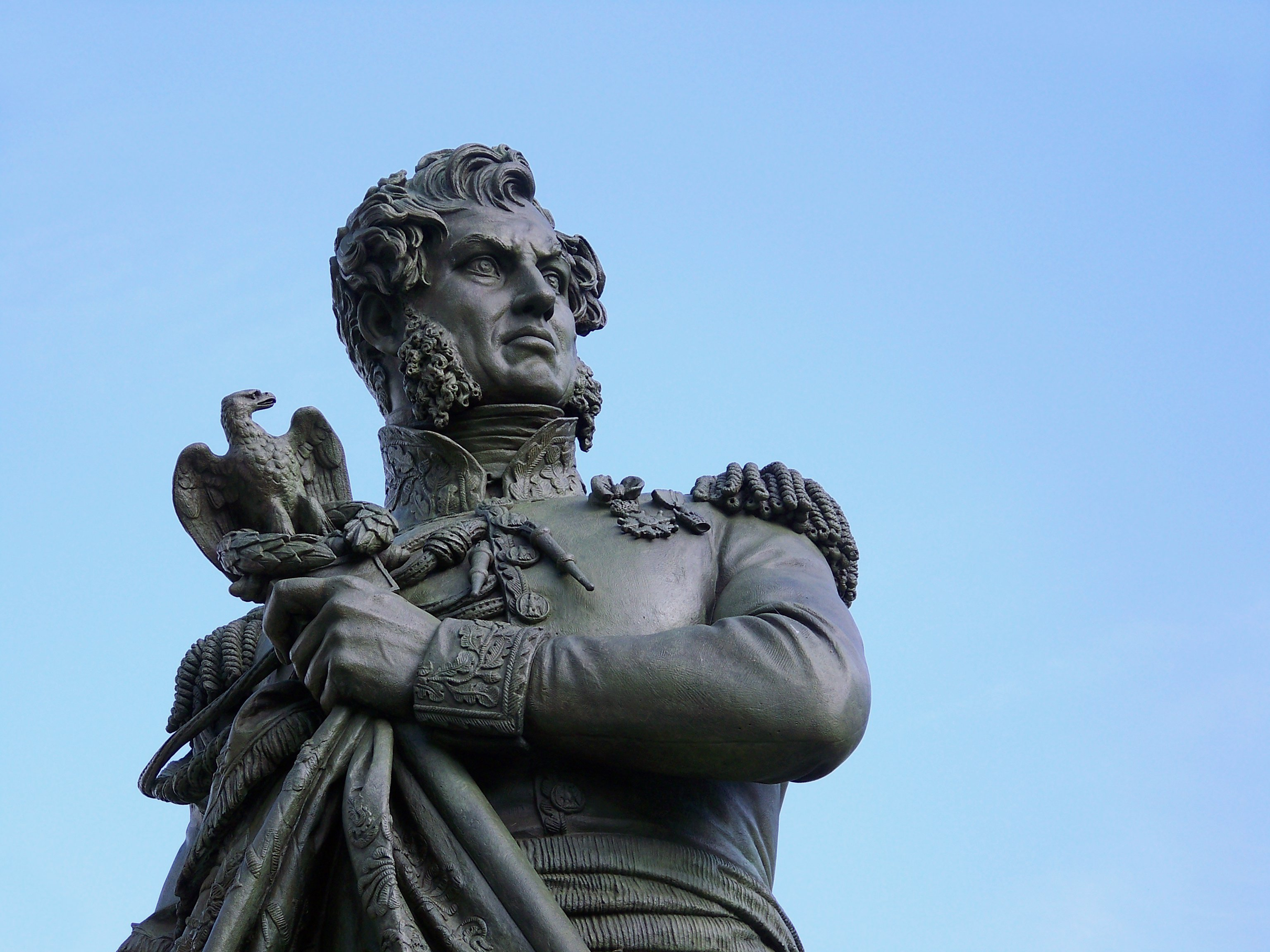
Statue of Pierre Cambronne in Nantes

Cambronne was tried for treason in France, but well defended by the royalist Pierre-Antoine Berryer, he was acquitted on 26 April 1816. He later married Mary Osburn, the Scottish nurse who had cared for him after Waterloo.

In 1820, Louis XVIII made him Commandant at Lille with the rank of brigadier, and made him a viscount. He retired to his birthplace in 1823, dying there in 1842. A statue of Cambronne was erected in Nantes in 1848, and a square in Paris, the Place Cambronne, also commemorates him.

He was buried in Cemetery Miséricorde, Nantes.

He makes a fictional appearance in C. S. Forester's Hornblower short story "St. Elizabeth of Hungary". Hornblower discovers Cambronne in the West Indies engaged in an attempt to rescue Napoleon from Saint Helena. Cambronne's exact words at Waterloo are discussed.
