= Imperial Guard (Napoleon I) =

Elite French military unit during the Napoleonic Wars

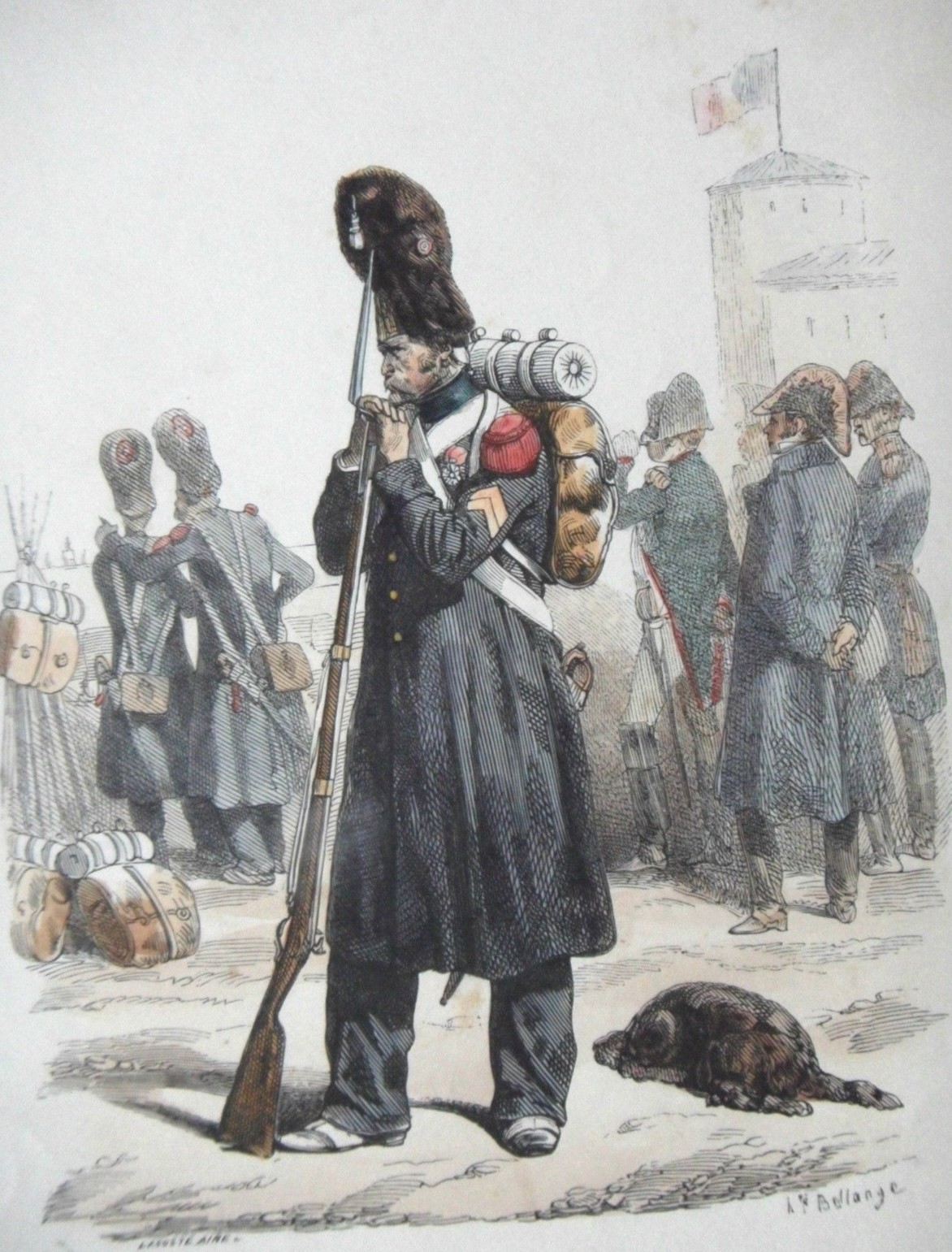
1st Regiment of Foot Grenadiers of the Old Guard in 1813

The Imperial Guard (French: Garde Impériale) was the imperial guard formation of the French Imperial Army. Under the direct command of Napoleon, the formation expanded considerably over time and acted as his personal bodyguard and tactical reserve. The Imperial Guard was divided into a general staff and infantry, cavalry and artillery regiments along with battalions of sappers and marines. It distinguished between experienced veterans and less experienced members by being separated into three formations: the Old Guard, Middle Guard and Young Guard. The Young Guard was virtually annihilated in the Battle of Krasnoi during the French invasion of Russia.

== History ==
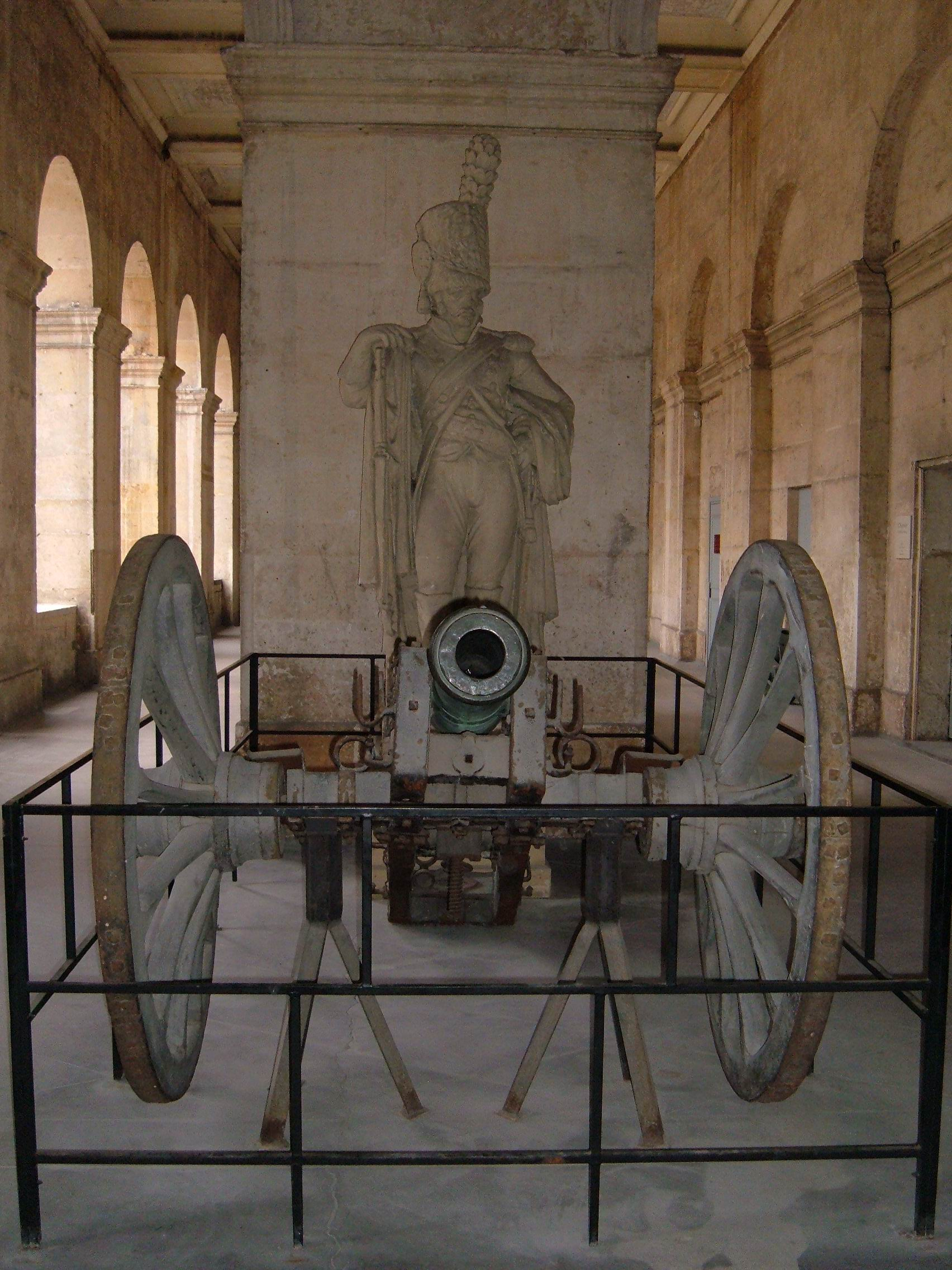
Memorial to the gunners of the Imperial Guard Artillery (Les Invalides).

The Guard had its origin in the Consular Guard (Garde des consuls), created on 28 November 1799 by the union of the Guard of the Directory (Garde du Directoire exécutif) and the Grenadiers of the Legislature (Grenadiers près de la Représentation nationale). These formations had for principal purpose the security of the executive and legislative branches of the French Republic and gathered a small number of soldiers, about a thousand. The Consular Guard changed its name to the Imperial Guard on 18 May 1804. Its headquarters were located at the Pentemont Abbey in Paris.

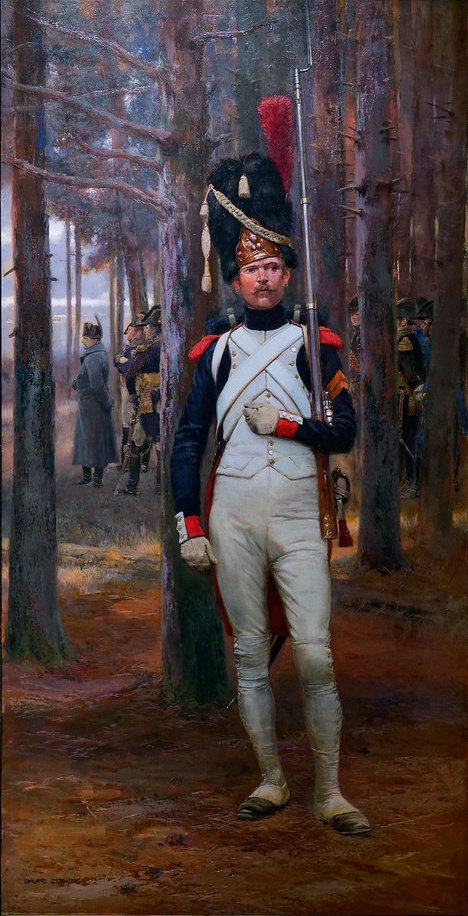
A painting of a 1st Regiment of Foot Grenadier of the Old Guard

Napoleon took great care of his Guard, particularly the Old Guard. The Grenadiers of the Old Guard were known to complain in the presence of the Emperor, giving them the nickname Les Grognards, the Grumblers. The Guard received better pay, rations, quarters, and equipment, and all guardsmen ranked one grade higher than all non-Imperial Guard soldiers. Other French soldiers even referred to Napoleon's Imperial Guard as "the Immortals".

The Guard played a major part in the climax of the Battle of Waterloo. It was thrown into the battle at the last minute to salvage a victory for Napoleon. Completely outnumbered, it faced terrible fire from the Anglo-allied lines, and began to retreat. For the first (and only) time in its history the Middle Guard retreated without orders. At the sight of this, Napoleon's army lost all hope of victory. The Middle Guard broke completely but the Old Guard (and some of the Young Guard) battalions held their formation and secured the retreat of the remainder of the French Army before being almost annihilated by British and Prussian artillery fire and cavalry charges.

The phrase "La Garde meurt mais ne se rend pas!" ("The Guard dies but does not surrender!") is generally attributed to General Pierre Cambronne. It has been suggested that this was in fact said by another general of the Guard, Claude-Étienne Michel, during their last stand at the Battle of Waterloo. The retort to a request to surrender may have been "La Garde meurt, elle ne se rend pas!" ("The Guard dies, it does not surrender!"). Letters published in The Times in June 1932 record that it may have been said by General Michel.

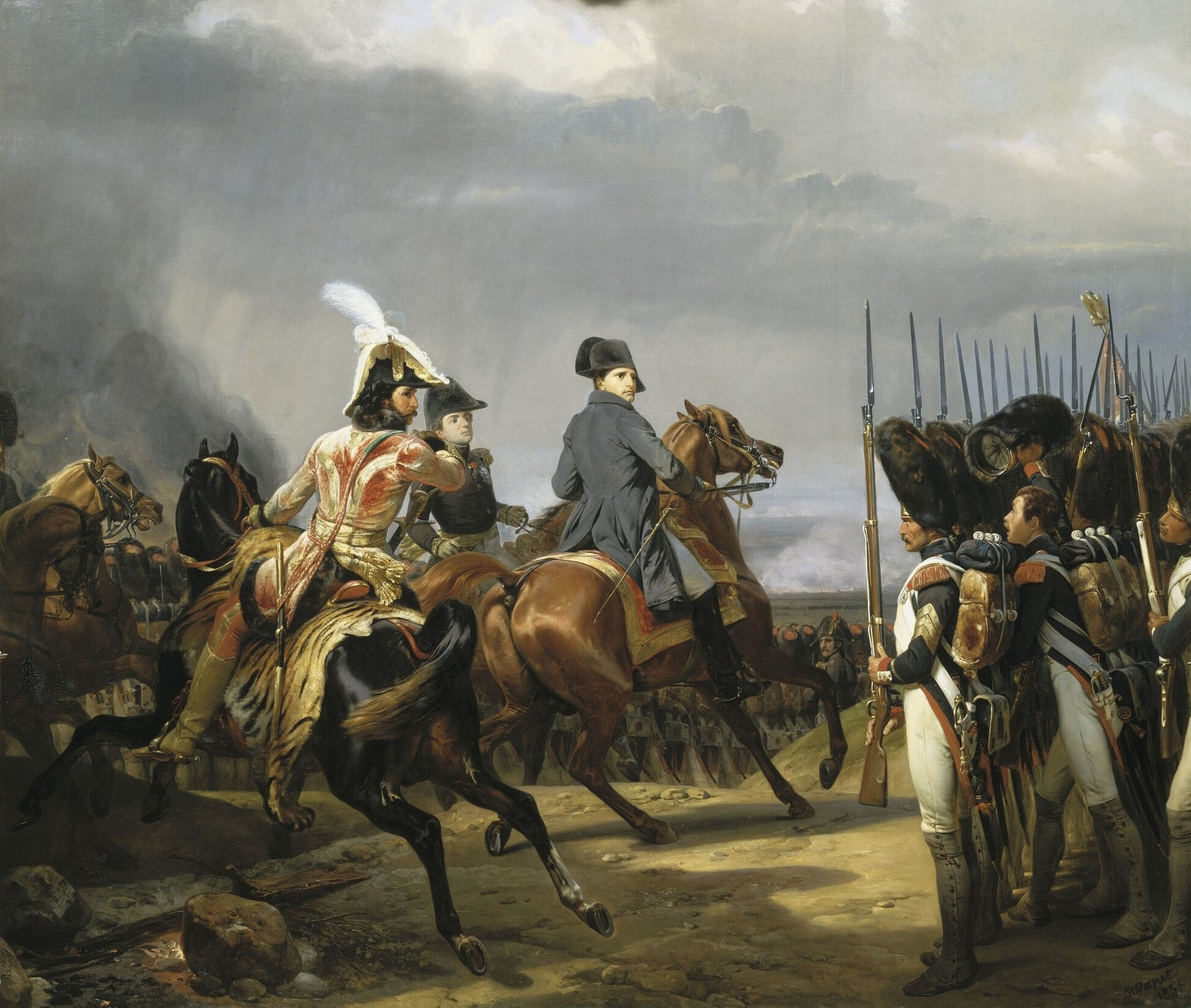
Napoleon reviewing the Guard during the Battle of Jena, 14 October 1806 (Galerie des Batailles).

The Old Guard regiments were assigned to the Guard's 3rd Division, while the remainder of the Guard's foot regiments were assigned to the 1st and 2nd Divisions.

== Numbers ==
In 1804, the Guard numbered 8,000 men. By the time of Napoleon's invasion of Russia in 1812, it had swelled to just under 100,000 men. The Guard had its own artillery, infantry and cavalry components just like a normal army corps. The Old Guard was the elite within the wider Imperial Guard.

== General Staff ==
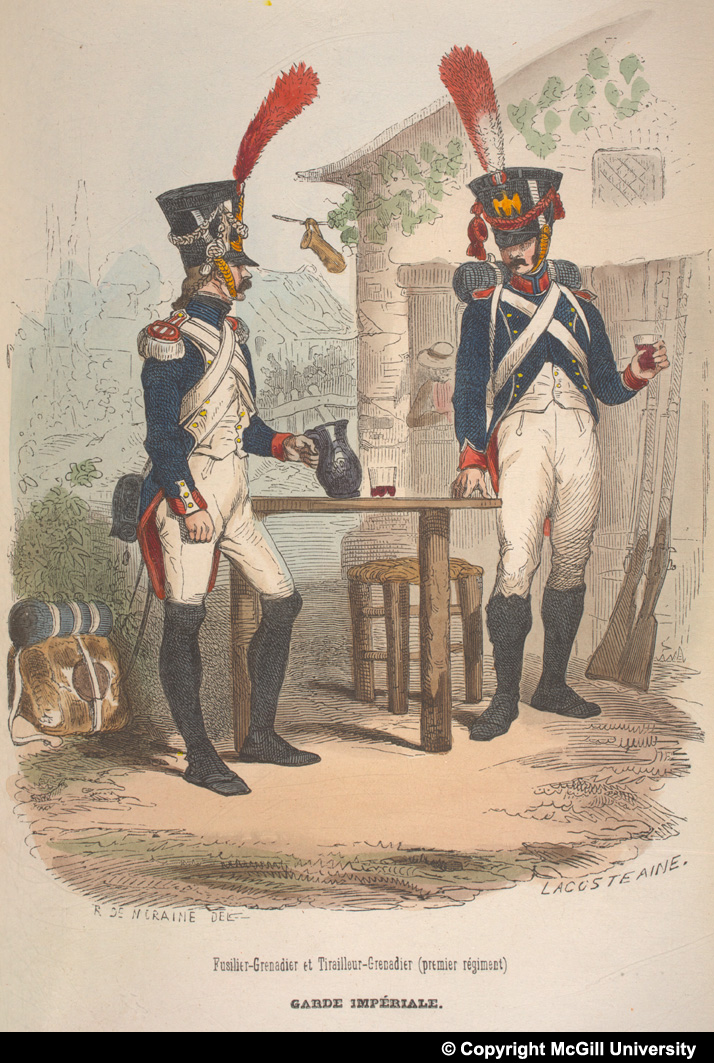
Fusilier-Grenadier and a Tirailleur-Grenadier

Created soon after the creation of the Guard itself, the General Staff by 1806 included the four Colonel-Generals of the four divisions of the Guard, all Marshal of the Empire in field rank. It also included an Inspector of Reviews, a Commissioner of War, 24 aides-de-camp, and other specialist officers, NCOs, and privates.

== Foot regiments ==
The Old Guard regiments served in the 3rd Division of the Guard, while the rest of the foot regiments of the Guard served in the 1st and 2nd Divisions.

=== Old Guard ===
==== 1st Regiment of Foot Grenadiers ====
The 1st Regiment of Foot Grenadiers (1^{er} Régiment de Grenadiers-à-Pied de la Garde Impériale) was founded from the Consular Guard Grenadiers (Gardes des Consuls), which had been formed from the Guards of the Directory. The battalion was made up of the Imperial French Army's most experienced and tallest men, and were essentially the army's most senior unit. One of two Imperial Guard battalions carried the Imperial Eagle into battle. After Napoleon's failure in the Invasion of Russia, only a few troops from the initial force remained, and the army had to be rebuilt using Peninsular War veterans. Napoleon himself, called them "The Immortals Of France".

==== 2nd Regiment of Foot Grenadiers ====
Raised in 1806 from veterans of the Grande Armée, the 2^{e} Régiment de Grenadiers-à-Pied de la Garde Impériale was a unit within the Middle Guard. This particular unit was disbanded in 1810 and was replaced by the so-called Dutch Grenadiers until in 1811, upon the upcoming invasion of Russia, the 2nd Regiment of Foot Grenadiers was reraised with 1,500 veteran soldiers. By 1813, the unit was designated to join the Old Guard as a reward of their long service in both Spain and Russia.

==== 3rd Regiment of Foot Grenadiers ====
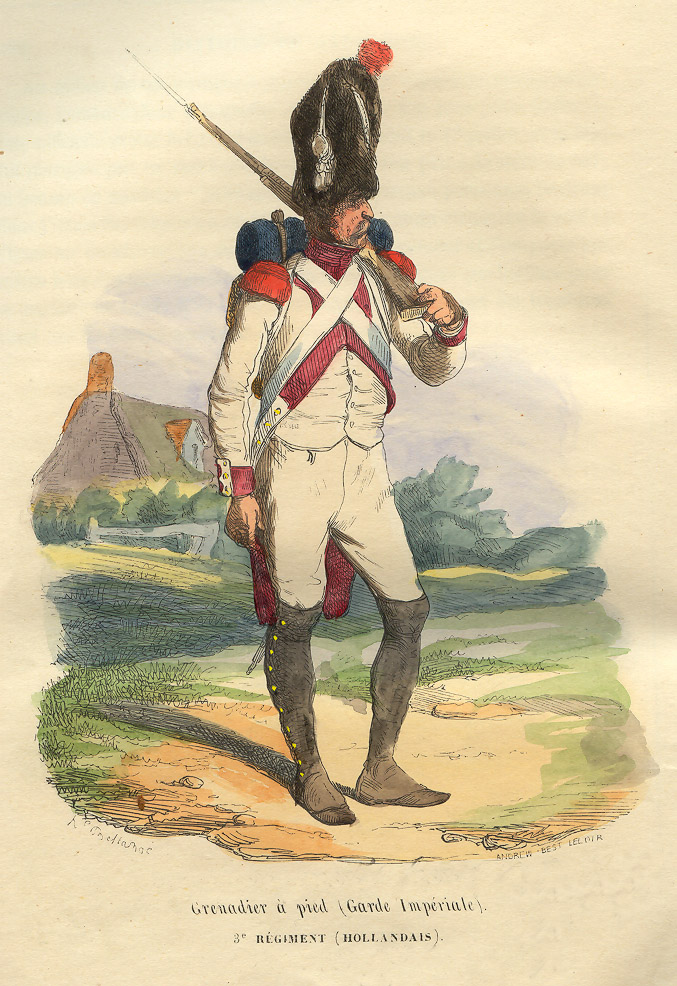
Grenadier of the 3^{e} Régiment de Grenadiers-à-Pied de la Garde Imperiale

Originally raised as part of the Dutch Royal Guard when Louis Bonaparte, brother to Napoleon, was made King of Holland. In 1810 the unit was incorporated into the Imperial Guard within the Middle Guard as the 2nd Regiment of Foot Grenadiers (2^{e} Régiment de Grenadiers-à-Pied de la Garde Impériale). It was disbanded 15 February 1813 after certain issues with staff and personnel, however was re-raised on 8 April 1815 to the replace the Fusilier-Grenadiers de la Garde Impériale. It was finally disbanded on 24 September 1815 after Napoleon's Second Abdication.

==== 4th Regiment of Foot Grenadiers ====
The 4^{e} Régiment de Grenadiers-à-Pied de la Garde Impériale was the last grenadier guard regiment to be raised. Created on 9 May 1815, it saw action at Ligny and Waterloo. It was disbanded on 24 September 1815.

=== Chasseurs ===
==== 1st Regiment of Foot Chasseurs ====
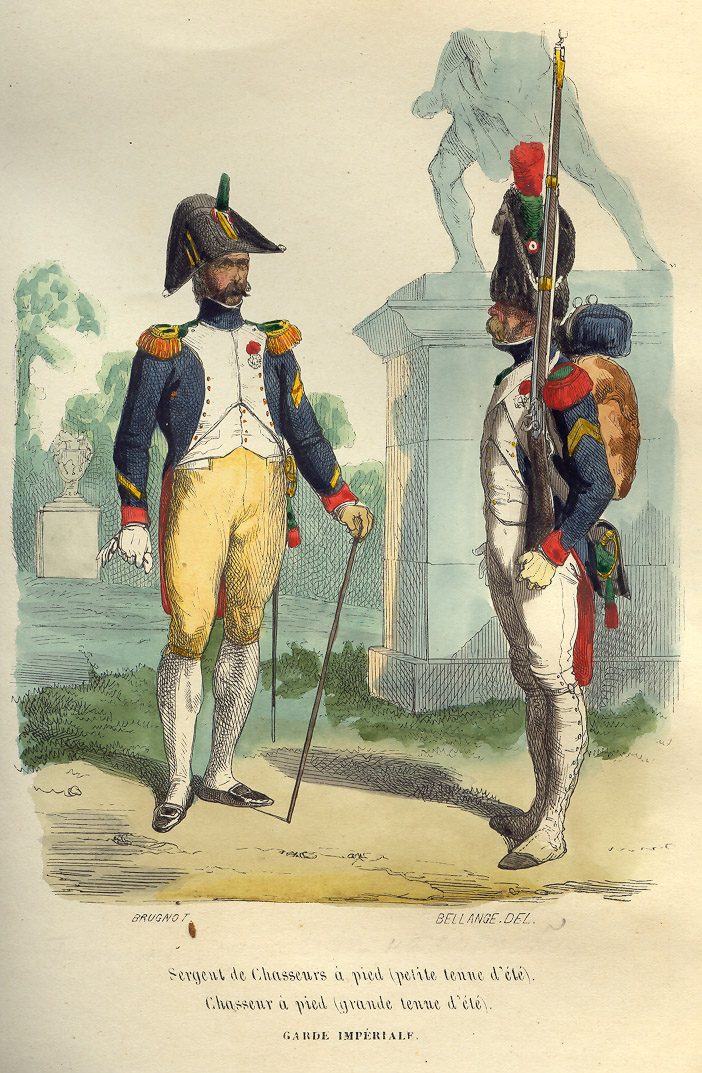
Chasseurs of the Old Guard c.1811

Being the second in seniority within the Imperial Guard Infantry, the 1^{er} Régiment de Chasseurs-à-Pied de la Garde Impériale was one of the most respected regiments within the Grande Armée; classed as part of the Old Guard.

==== 2nd Regiment of Foot Chasseurs ====
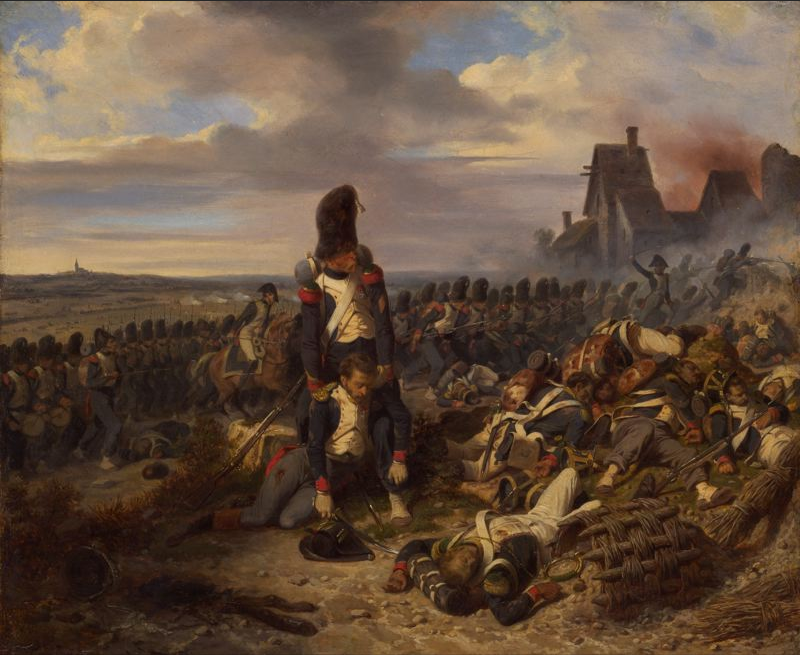
Chasseurs à pied de la Garde (Hippolyte Bellangé)

Raised in 1806, the 2^{e} Régiment de Chasseurs-à-Pied de la Garde Impériale was disbanded in 1809 and re-raised in 1811 for the invasion of Russia. As part of the Middle Guard, they engaged in numerous battles and by 1813 they were finally raised to be part of the Old Guard.

==== 3rd Regiment of Foot Chasseurs ====
The 3^{e} Régiment de Chasseurs-à-Pied de la Garde Impériale briefly existed during the 100 days campaign after Napoleon's escape from Elba.

==== 4th Regiment of Foot Chasseurs ====
The 4^{e} Régiment de Chasseurs-à-Pied de la Garde Impériale was also raised during the 100 days campaign after Napoleon's escape from Elba.

=== Middle Guard ===
==== Fusiliers-Grenadiers ====
The Fusiliers-Grenadiers were the second regiment of Fusiliers created on 15 December 1806 from the 1st battalions of the Grenadier and Chasseur Vélites, forming a regiment that was to be 1,800 men strong. Conscripts and men from the Compagnies de Reserve brought the new regiment up to four battalions of four companies each, 120 men per company. They were disbanded on 12 May 1814.

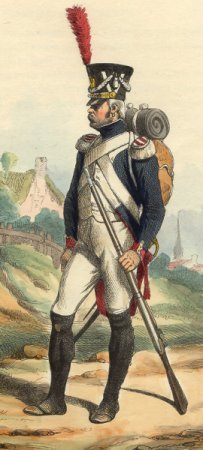
A Fusiliers-Grenadier Of The Middle Guard

==== Fusiliers-Chasseurs ====
The Fusiliers-Chasseurs were created on 19 October 1806 from the 1st battalions of the Vélites of the Grenadiers and Chasseurs of the Guard; the regiment was to be 1,200 men strong. Men of the Compagnies de Reserve were added to bring the regiment up to four battalions of four companies each, 120 men to a company. In 1813, each battalion was enlarged by two more companies. They were disbanded on 12 May 1814.

=== Young Guard ===
==== Tirailleurs-Grenadiers ====
The first regiment to become known as the Young Guard, Tirailleurs Grenadiers (1^{er} Régiment de Tirailleurs de la Garde Impériale) were raised in 1809 from conscripts, but they had to be able to read and write. A second regiment was formed later in the same year. In 1810 both were renamed 1^{er} & 2^{e} Régiment de Tirailleurs de la Garde Impériale.

==== Tirailleurs-Chasseurs ====
Two regiments of Tirailleurs-Chasseurs were formed at the same time as the Tirailleurs-Grenadiers, and were also included in the Young Guard. For the 1812 campaign in Russia these were expanded to six regiments. Both became 5^{e} & 6^{e} Régiment de Tirailleurs de la Garde Impériale in 1811.

During the 1813–14 campaigns the number of Regiments de Tirailleurs de la Garde Impériale was increased to sixteen although they rarely equaled the regiments of the Young Guard of 1811. The 7th, 8th and 9th were recruited from the 'Pupilles de la Garde', childsoldiers who were to become Napoleon's son's guard and who stayed in France during the Napoleon's invasion of Russia.

==== Voltigeurs ====
Created from the Tirailleurs-Chasseurs in late 1810, the Regiments de Voltigeurs de la Garde Impériale became one of the largest corps in the Guard, eventually absorbing the Regiments de Conscrits-Chasseurs to number sixteen regiments by 1814. The 14^{e} Régiment de Voltigeurs de la Garde Impériale was created from the Spanish volunteers that retreated with the French Army, and the Régiment de Voltigeurs de la Garde Royale Espagnol.

==== Conscripts-Grenadiers ====
Created in 1809, the two Conscripts-Grenadiers Regiments (Régiment de Conscrit-Grenadiers), though intended to provide a reserve for the Young Guard, were not included in the Guard, receiving line infantry pay. The regiments became 3e & 4e Régiment de Tirailleurs de la Garde Impériale in 1810.

==== Conscripts-Chasseurs ====
Created in 1809, the Conscripts-Chasseurs Regiment though intended to provide a reserve for the Young Guard, was not included in the guard, receiving line infantry pay. After 1811, the Conscrits-Chasseurs formed the 3rd and 4th regiments of the Voltigeurs of the Guard.

==== National Guard Regiment of the Guard ====
This regiment was created from the National Guard companies of the northern departments of France. The regiment was organized according to the line infantry tables, and in 1813 was renamed the 7th Regiment of Voltigeurs.

==== Flanqueur Grenadiers and Chasseurs ====
In preparation for the invasion of Russia, Napoleon ordered a further creation of units for the Guard that included Régiment de Flanqueurs-Grenadiers de la Garde Impériale and Flanqueur-Chasseurs Regiment (Régiment de Flanqueurs-Chasseurs de la Garde Impériale).

Illustrations of foot regiments by Adolphe de Chesnel
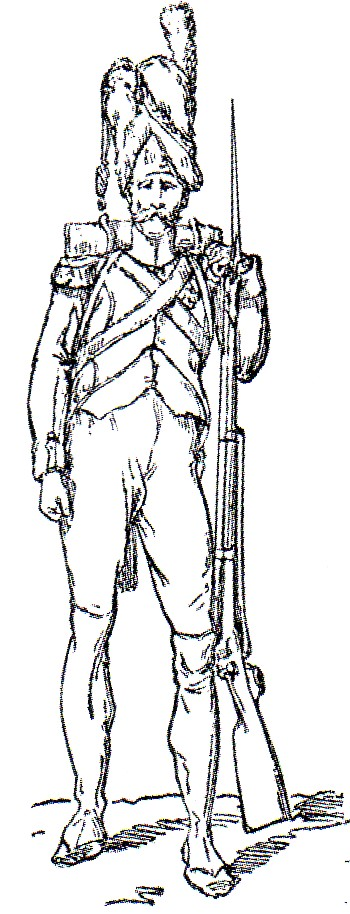
Grenadier

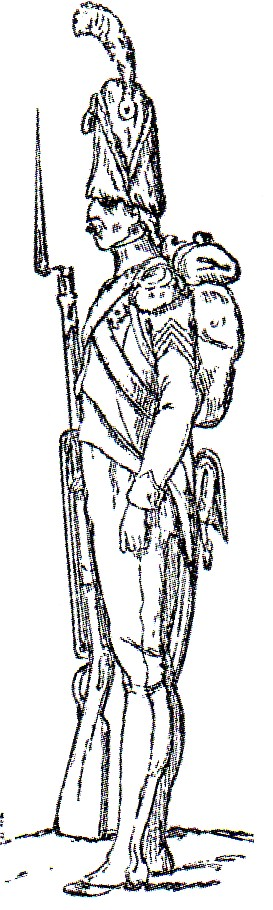
Foot Chasseur

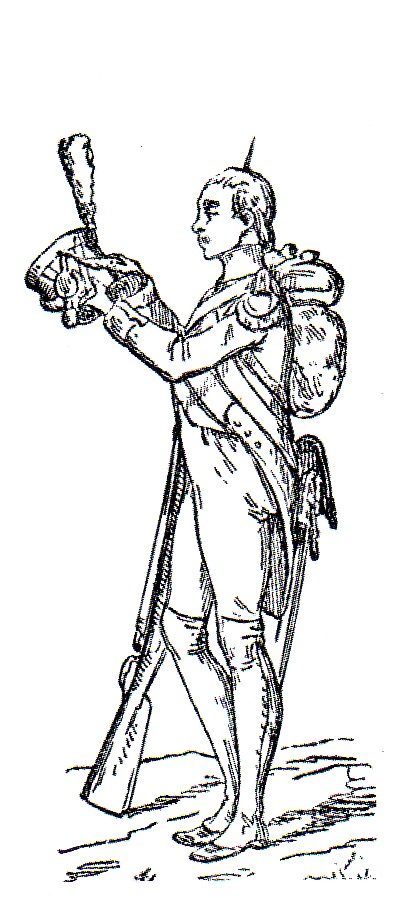
Fusilier Grenadiers

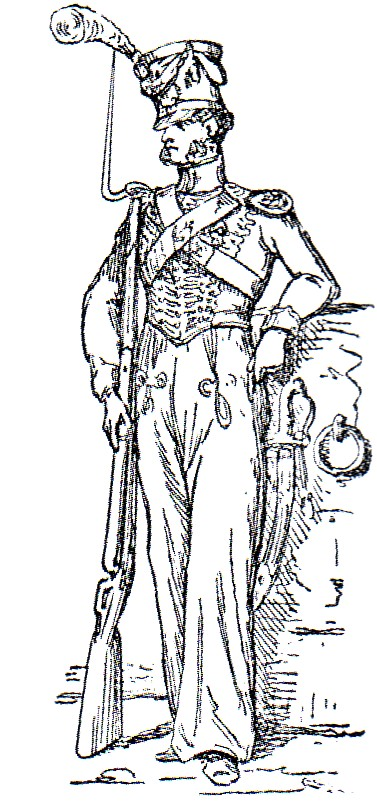
Marines of the Guard

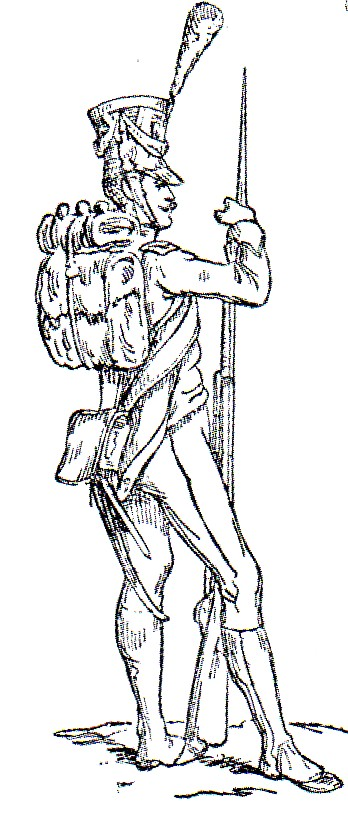
Tirailleurs Grenadiers

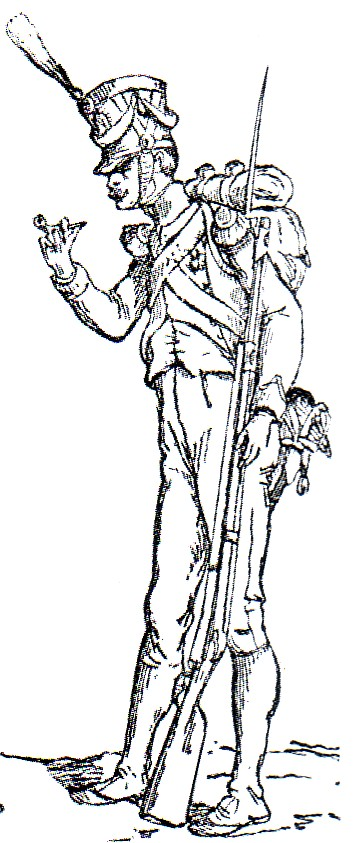
Voltigeurs of the Guard

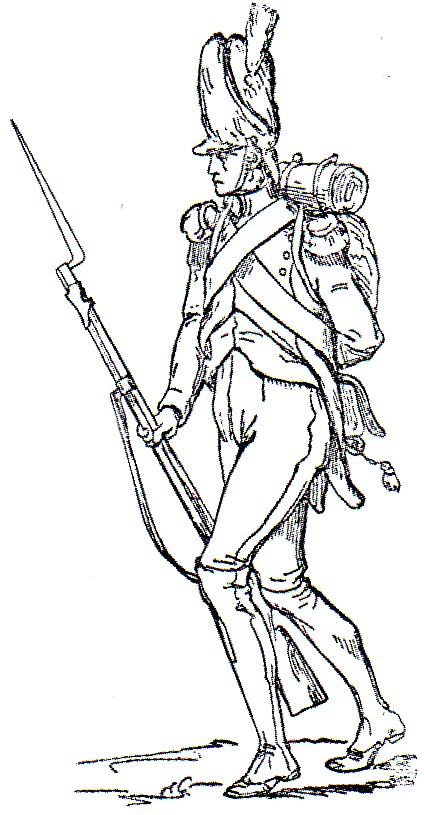
Foot Artillery

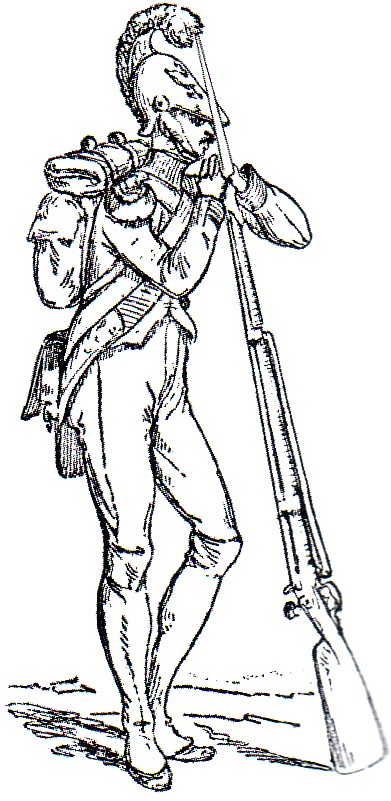
Sapeurs de la Garde

== Cavalry regiments ==
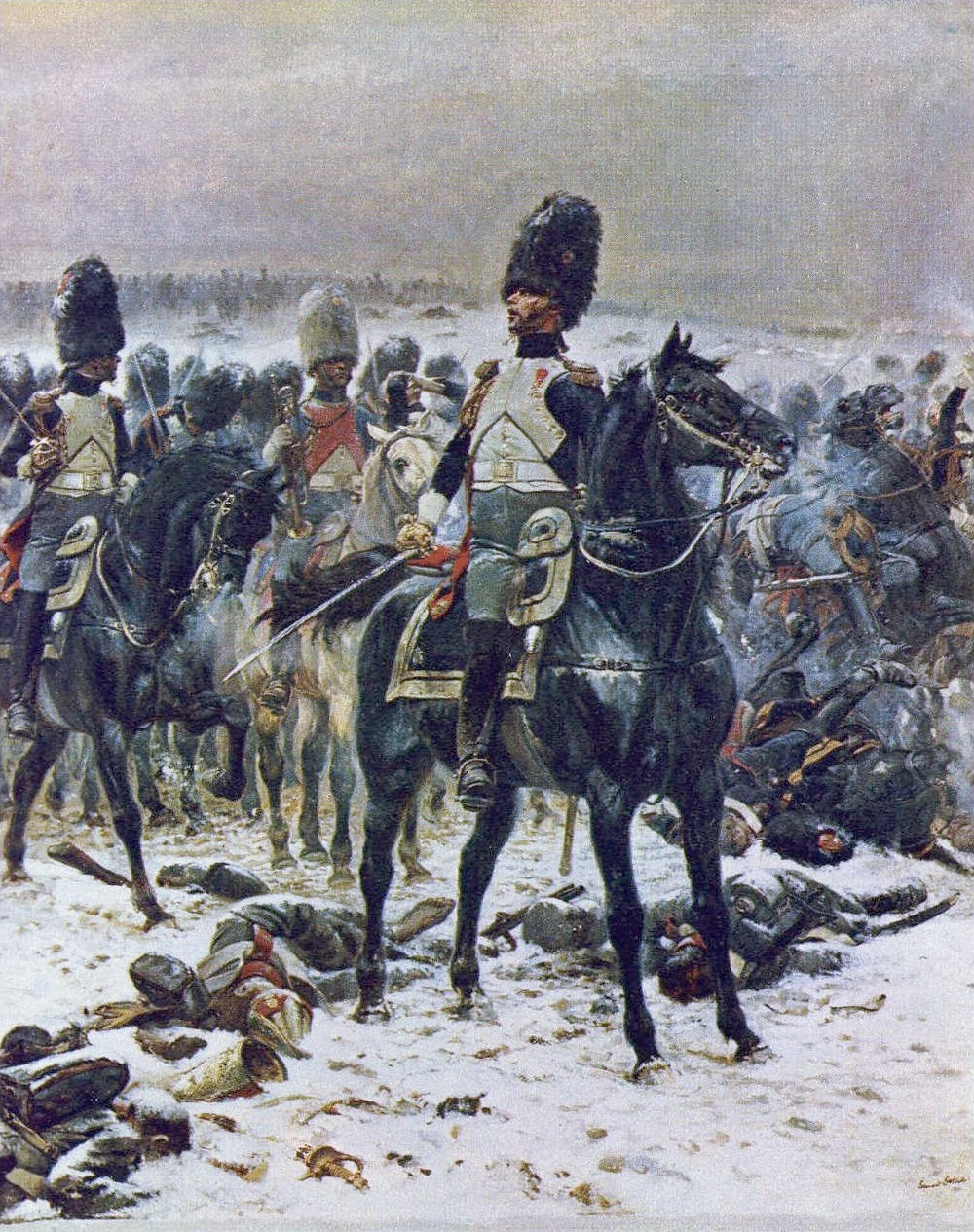
Horse Grenadiers of the Imperial Guard at the Battle of Preussisch Eylau 8 February 1807

The Imperial Guard cavalry constituted a corps in itself and had its own commander, with seasoned cavalrymen like Marshal Jean-Baptiste Bessières and generals Frédéric Henri Walther or Étienne Marie Antoine Champion de Nansouty successively at its helm. Augustin Daniel Belliard was also interim commander for a few days in 1814, before giving command to Horace François Bastien Sébastiani de La Porta, who held it for a short while, until Napoleon's abdication in April 1814. During the Hundred Days, there was no overall commander of the Guard cavalry, with command divided between Charles, comte Lefebvre-Desnouettes (light cavalry division) and Claude-Étienne Guyot (heavy cavalry division).

=== Horse Grenadiers ===
The Horse Grenadiers was the senior cavalry regiment of the Guard, and originated from the Consular Guard. Classed as heavy cavalry, the regiment did not wear a cuirass, but was known for its distinctive bearskin head-dress and black horses. It was known by the nickname of "the Gods"; also as "the Big Heels".

=== Chasseurs à Cheval ===
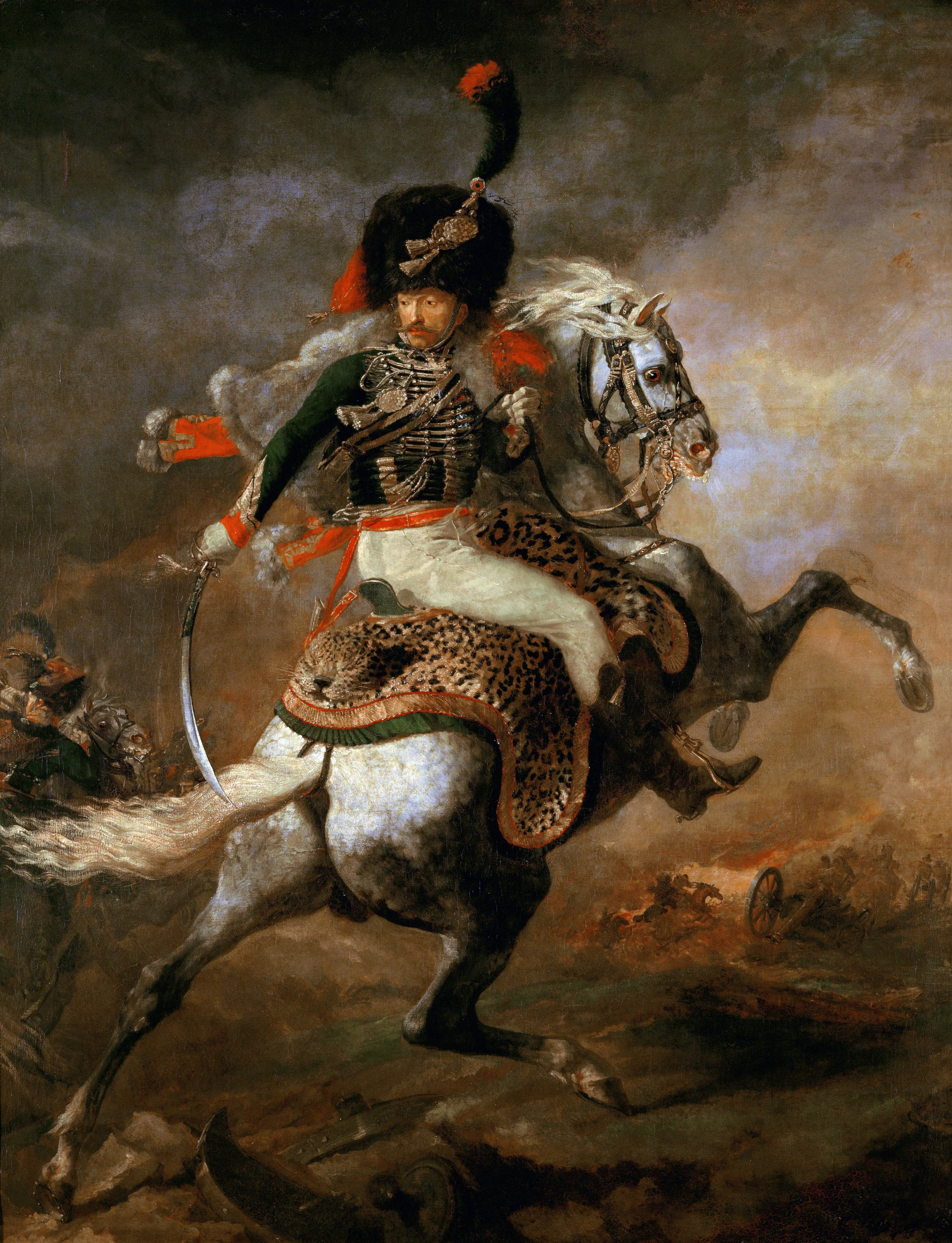
Famous painting of an officer of the Chasseurs à Cheval by Théodore Géricault, c.1812 (Louvre).

The Regiment of Chasseurs à Cheval (1^{er} Régiment de Chasseurs-à-Cheval de la Garde Impériale) was also created from the Consular Guard, and ranked second in seniority, although it was a light cavalry regiment. It was the Chasseurs that usually provided personal escort to Napoleon, and he often wore the uniform of the regiment in recognition of this service. The regiment was not only known for its lavish uniform, but its combat history, as well. A second regiment (2^{e} Régiment de Chasseurs-à-Cheval de la Garde Impériale) was created briefly from Regiment d'Eclaireurs Lanciers in 1815.

=== Empress' Dragoons ===
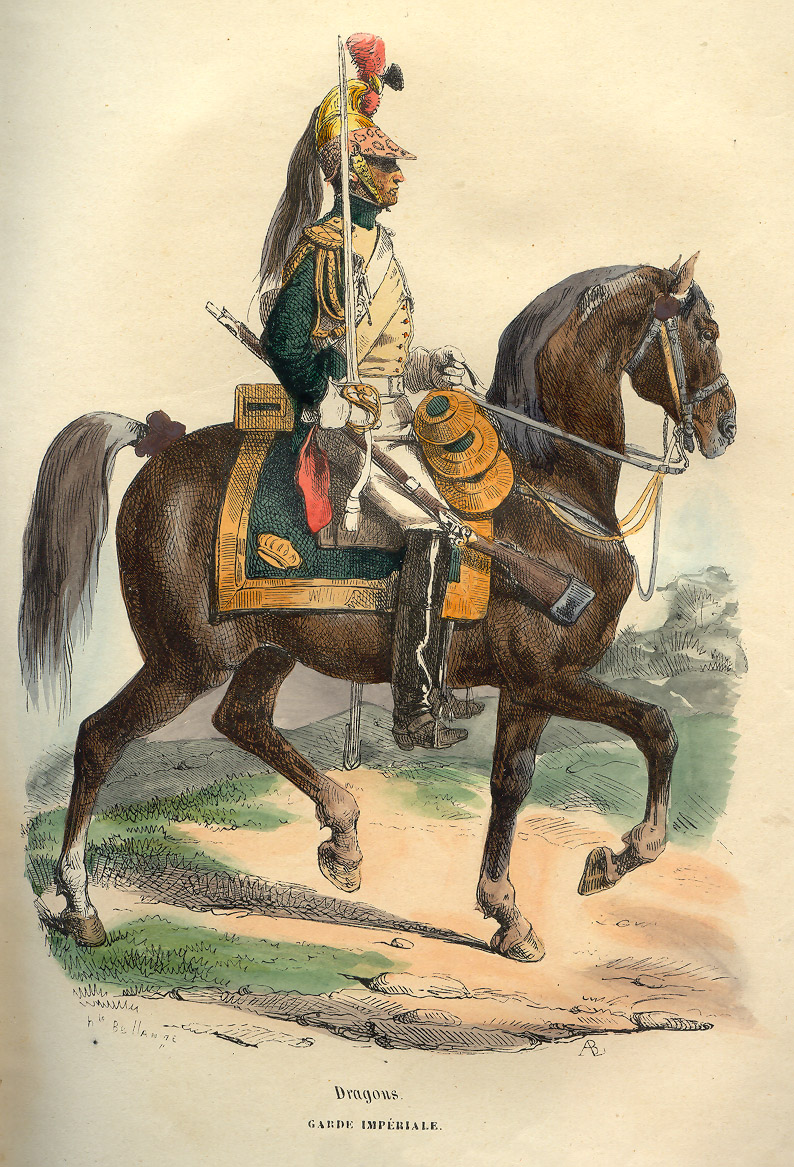
A cavalryman of the Empress' Dragoons

The dragoon regiments of the line distinguished themselves in the German campaign of 1805, and so Napoleon decided (in a decree of 15 April 1806) to reorganize the cavalry of the Guard and create within it a regiment of dragoons (Régiment de Dragons de la Garde Impériale), made up of three squadrons, headed by 60 officers personally selected by Napoleon. The first squadron was to have 296 men, and be made up of "vélites", whilst the other two were regular squadrons of 476 horsemen. To complete this new unit, each of the 30 dragoon regiments of the line provided 12 men, each of whom had done 10 years of service, and the brigadier, chasseur, and dragoon line regiments provided the sous-officiers. This regiment quickly became known as the Régiment de dragons de l'Impératrice (the Empress' Dragoons) in tribute to their patroness, Joséphine de Beauharnais, and up until its last member died, the Regiment marked the anniversary of her death.

The unit's numbers rose to 1269 in 1807 with the addition of two new squadrons, and on 9 December 1813 it was attached to the Guard's 3rd regiment of éclaireurs. The dragoons' uniform and weaponry was the same as those of the Guard's mounted grenadiers, only in green rather than blue, and (in place of the bonnet à poil) a copper helmet with a hanging mane in the Neo-Greek Minerve style, and a red plume.

=== Éclaireurs ===
In the Russian campaign of 1812, the French Army had suffered badly from attacks by the Russian Cossack cavalry. About to fight on French soil for the first time since the French Revolutionary Wars, Napoleon decided to reorganize the Imperial Guard. In Article 1 of a decree of 4 December 1813, he created three regiments of Éclaireurs à Cheval de la Garde Impériale (mounted scouts of the Guard) as counterparts to the Cossacks. They were also known as Hussards Éclaireurs within the Guard.

They joined the army on 1 January 1814, just in time to participate in the Six Days Campaign, and were disbanded after Napoleon's first abdication.

The 1^{er} Régiment d'Éclaireurs à Cheval was attached to the Grenadiers à Cheval, and was thus named the regiment of Éclaireurs-grenadiers.

The 2^{e} Régiment d'Éclaireurs à Cheval was attached to the Dragons de L'Impératrice (Empress' Dragoons).

The 3^{e} Régiment d'Éclaireurs à Cheval was attached to the 1^{er} Régiment de Chevau-Légers-Lanciers.

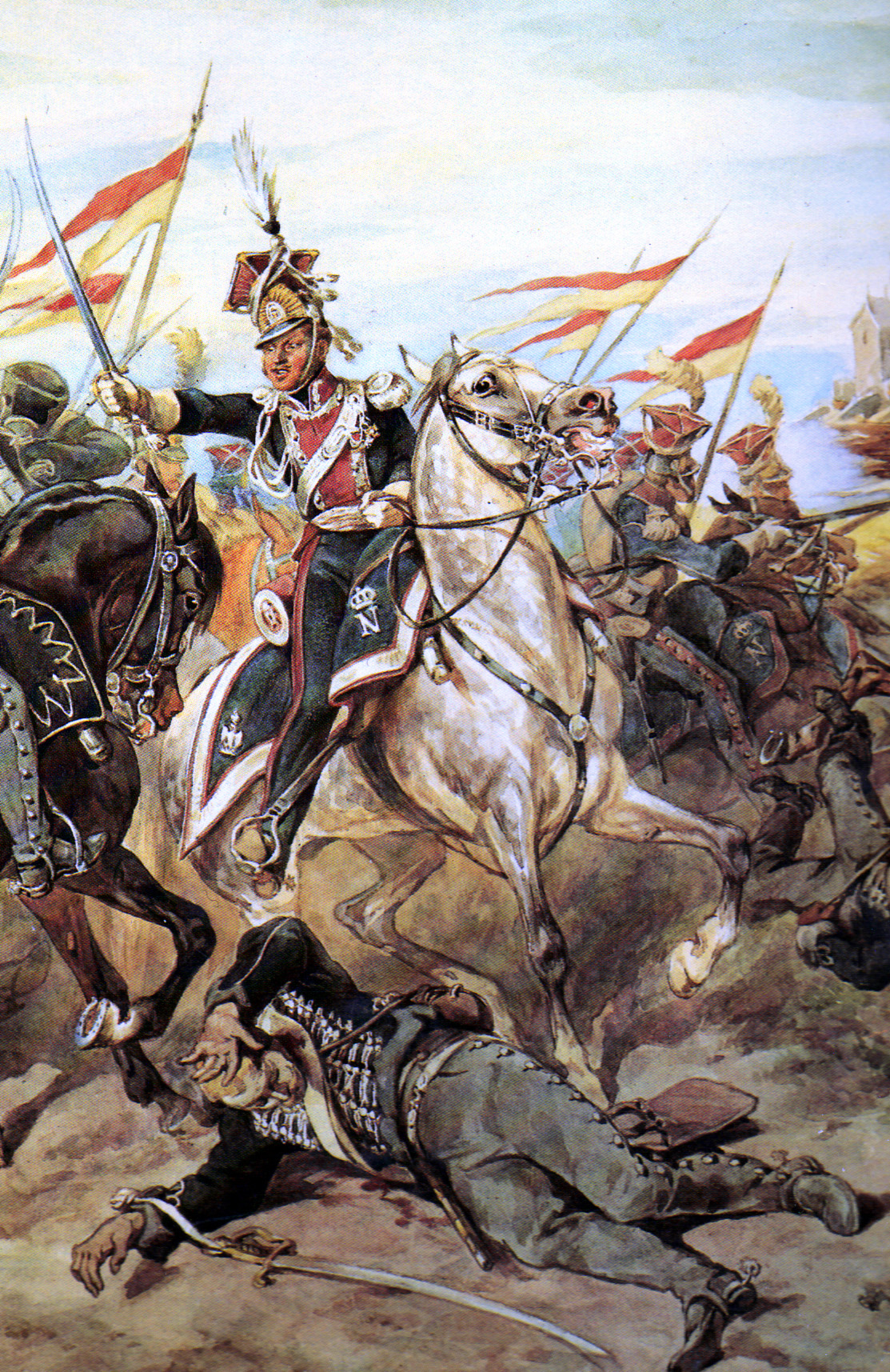
Polish chevaulegers lanciers of the Imperial Guard in the Battle of Peterswalde in 1813

=== 1st (Polish) Regiment of Lancers ===
The regiment called the Régiment de Chevau-Légers Polonais de la Garde was created in 1807 after the 1806 defeat of the Allies, and the French creation of the Duchy of Warsaw. In 1811, with the raising of the Dutch Lancers of the Guard, the regiment was renamed 1^{er} Régiment de Chevau-Légers-Lanciers de la Garde Impériale.

=== 2nd (Franco-Dutch) Regiment of Lancers ===
Raised in 1810 from former Dutch Army cavalry units as the 2^{e} Régiment de chevau-légers lanciers de la Garde Impériale, the regiment became known as the Red Lancers from their uniform.

=== 3rd (Lithuanian) Regiment of Lancers ===
A Light Cavalry Lancers Regiment of the Imperial Guard (3^{e} Régiment de Chevau-Légers-Lanciers de la Garde Impériale) was raised in Lithuania from its nobles during the invasion of Russia in 1812, but was virtually destroyed in the retreat of the same year, and the survivors incorporated into 3^{e} Régiment de Eclaireurs. Incorporated into the regiment was a squadron of Lithuanian Tatars as the Escadron de Tartares Lithuaniens.

=== Mamelukes ===
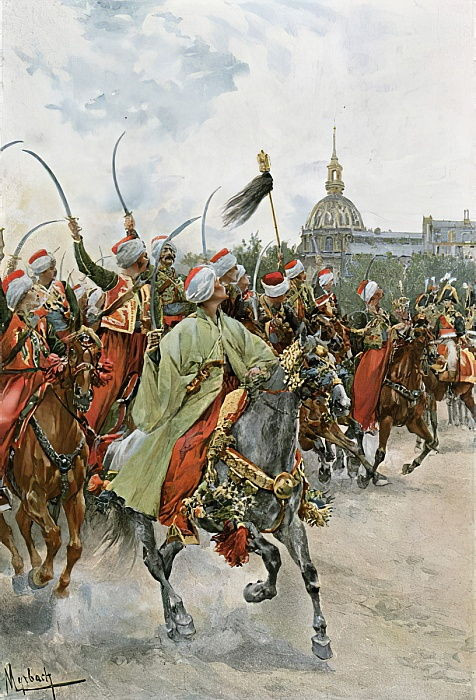
Mamelukes of the Imperial Guard

A squadron of Mamelukes (Escadron de Mamelukes) returned with Napoleon from the Egyptian Campaign in 1799. They were inducted into the Guard, and usually attached to the Chasseurs à Cheval. The squadron was never increased to a regiment in strength. Over the years their casualties were replaced from French cavalry regiments, or from any vaguely Middle Eastern related nationalities.

=== Elite Gendarmes ===
Although technically classed as cavalry of the Guard, Legion de Gendarmerie d'Elite troops invariably served in detachments with the General Staff of the Guard, Napoleon's personal headquarters, and the Guard field camps. The Legion included mounted and dismounted troops, the mounted component being two squadrons.

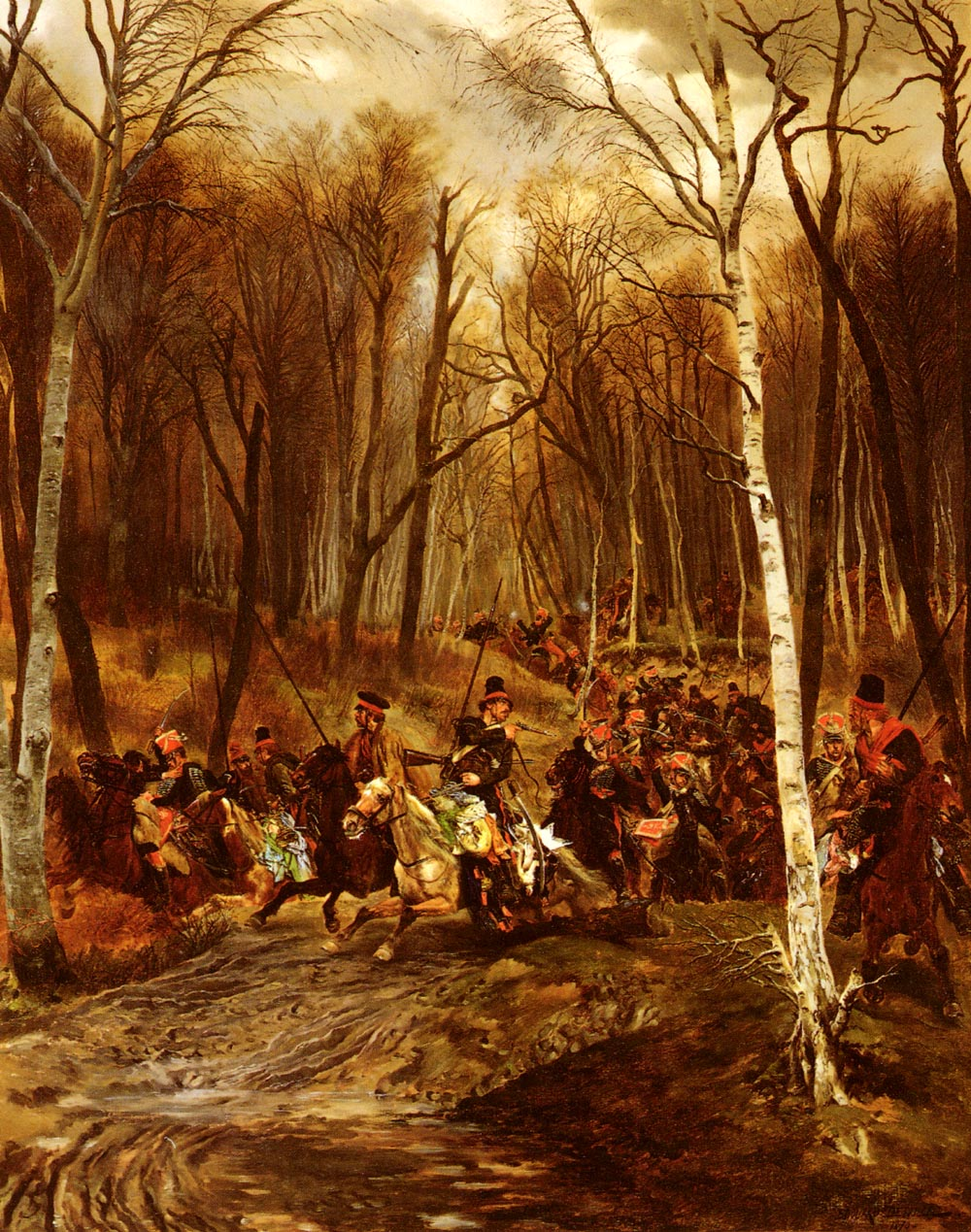
Cossacks Attacking a squadron of the Guards of Honour, c.1813

=== Guards of Honour ===
The Guards of Honour (Régiment de Garde d'Honneur) were four regiments of light cavalry which Napoleon created in 1813 for his campaigns in Germany to reinforce his Guard cavalry decimated in Russia. The regiments were dressed in the fashion of the hussars. They served alongside the other Guard cavalry, but were not technically part of the Old, Middle or Young Guard.

Illustrations of cavalry regiments by Adolphe de Chesnel
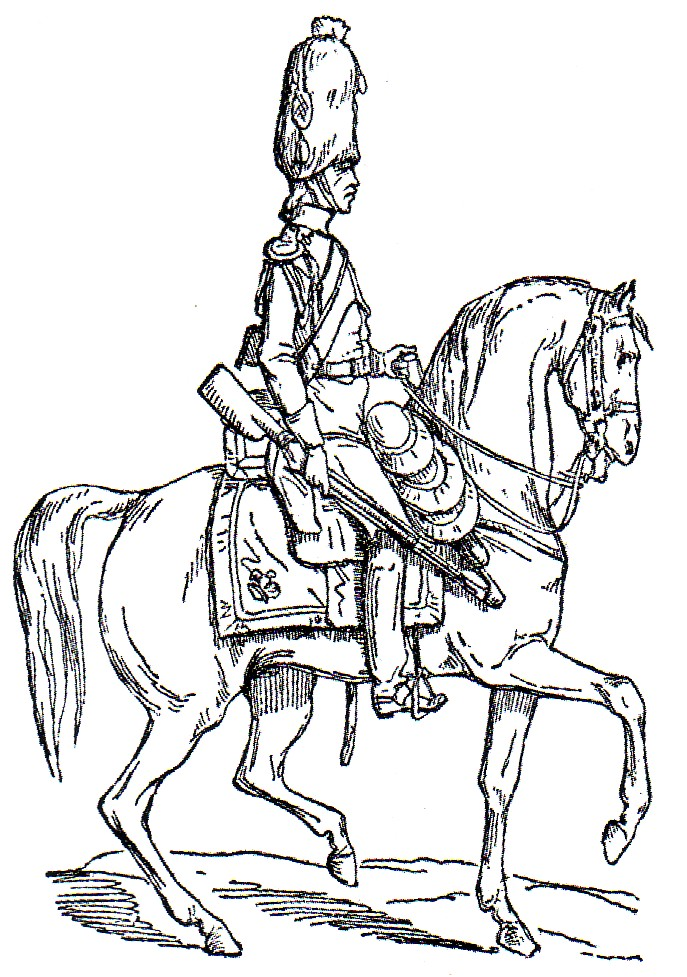
Horse Grenadiers

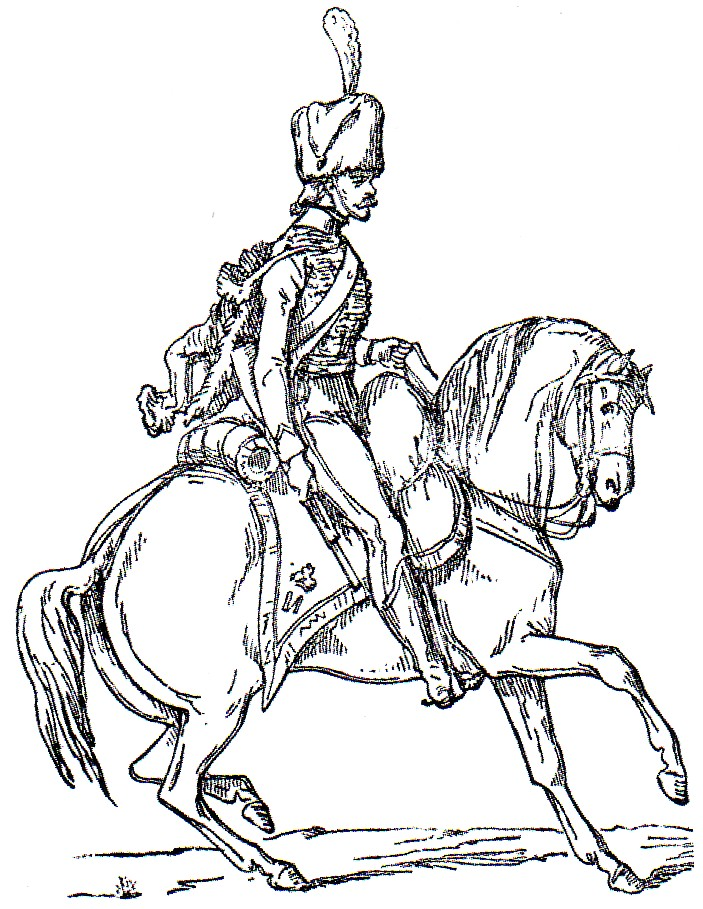
Horse Artillery

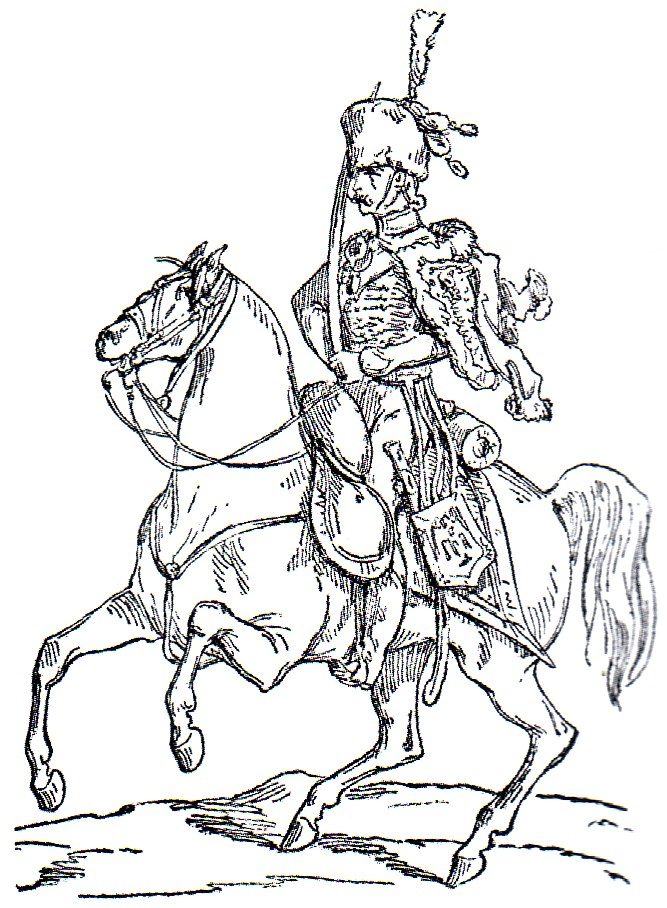
Chasseurs a Cheval

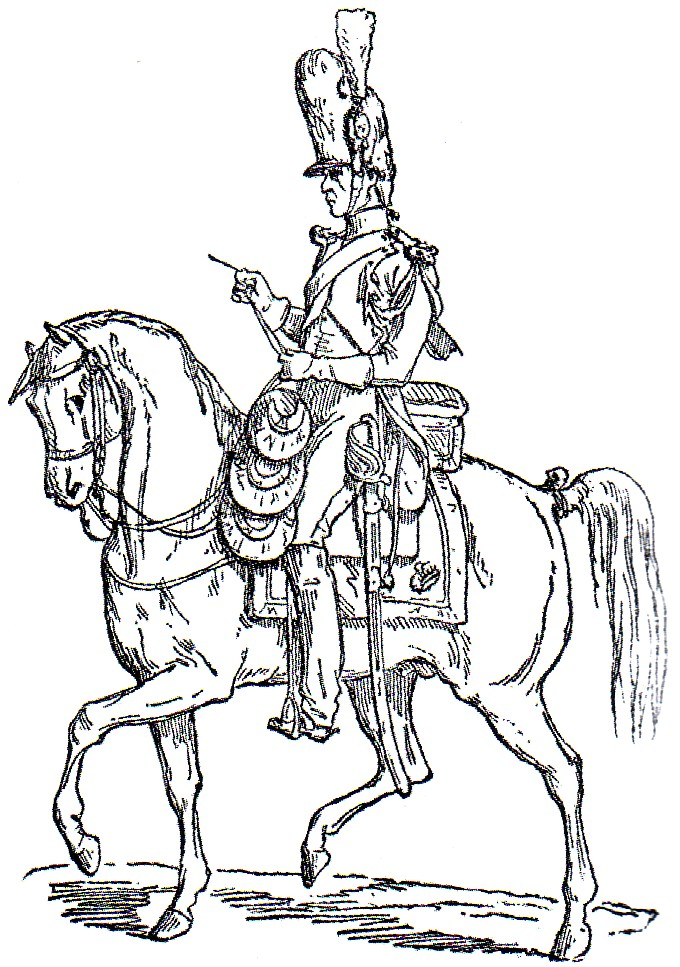
Elite Gendarmes

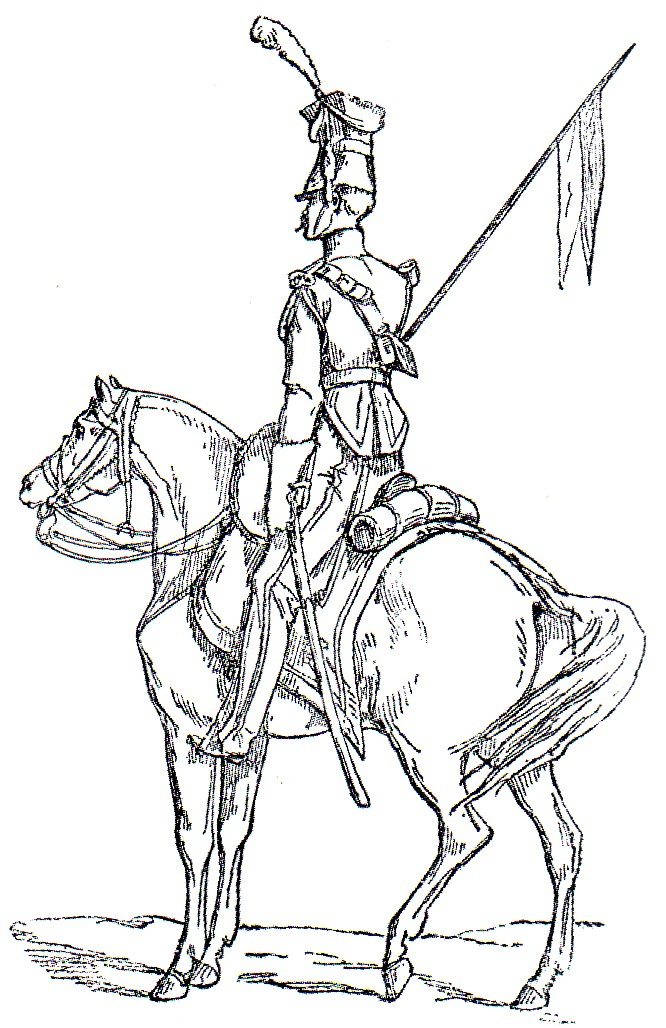
Lancers

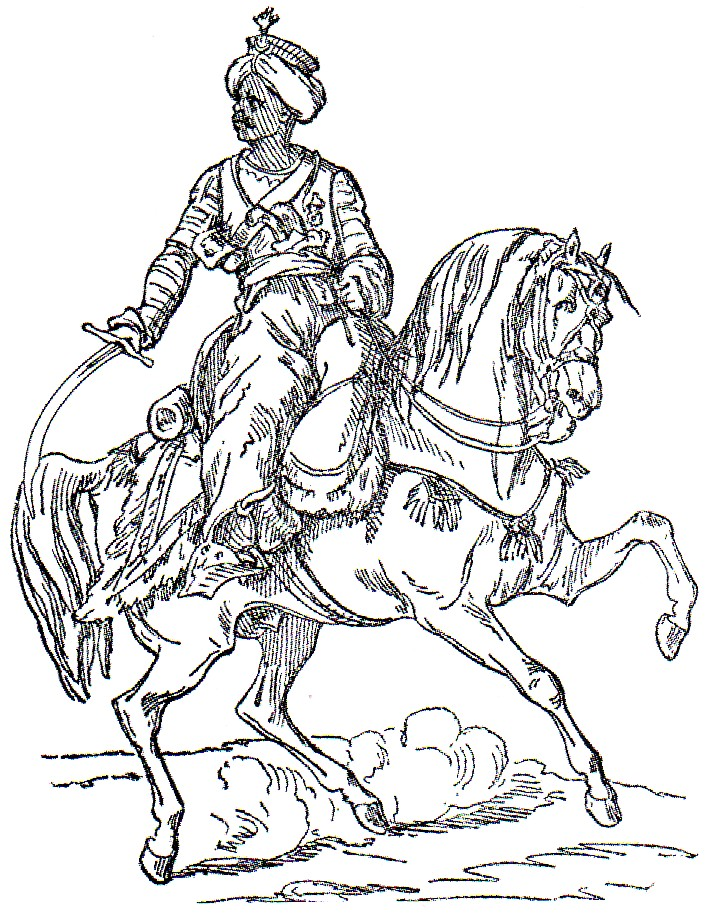
Mamelukes

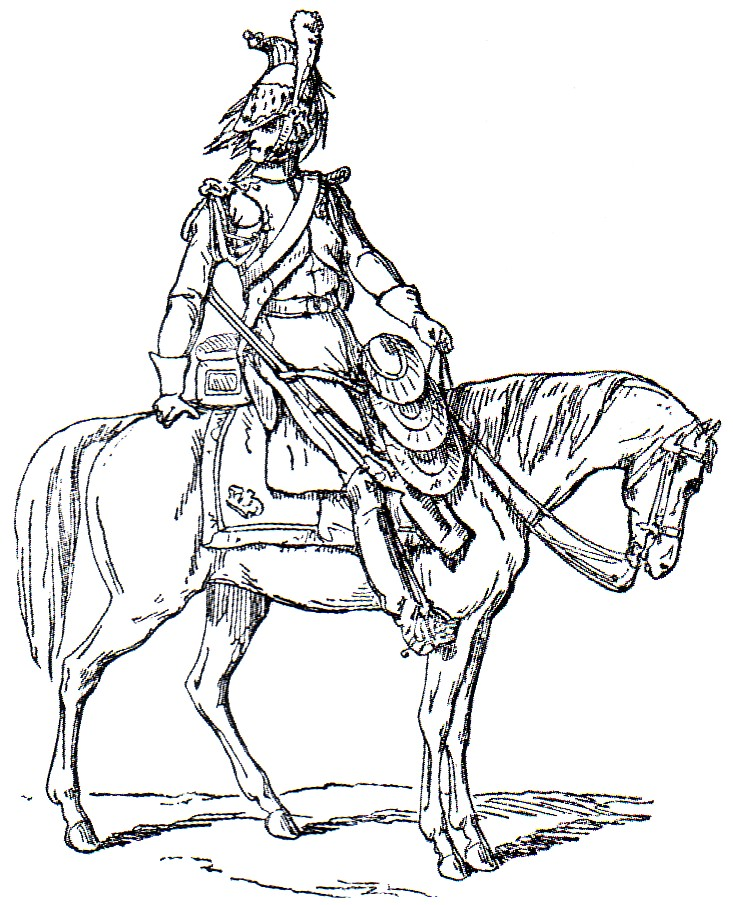
Empress's Dragoons

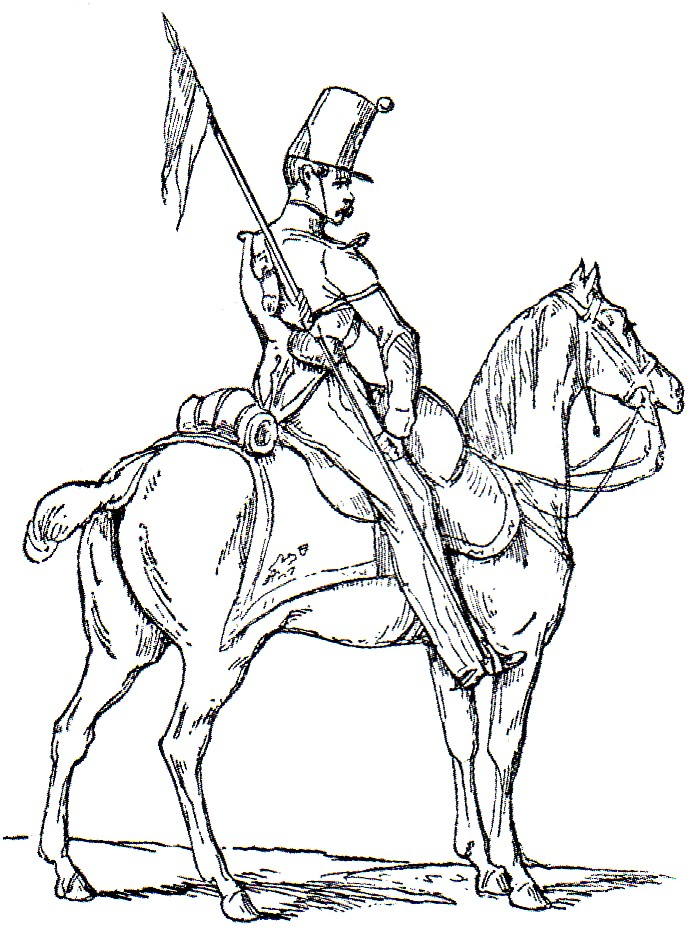
Éclaireurs

== Artillery ==
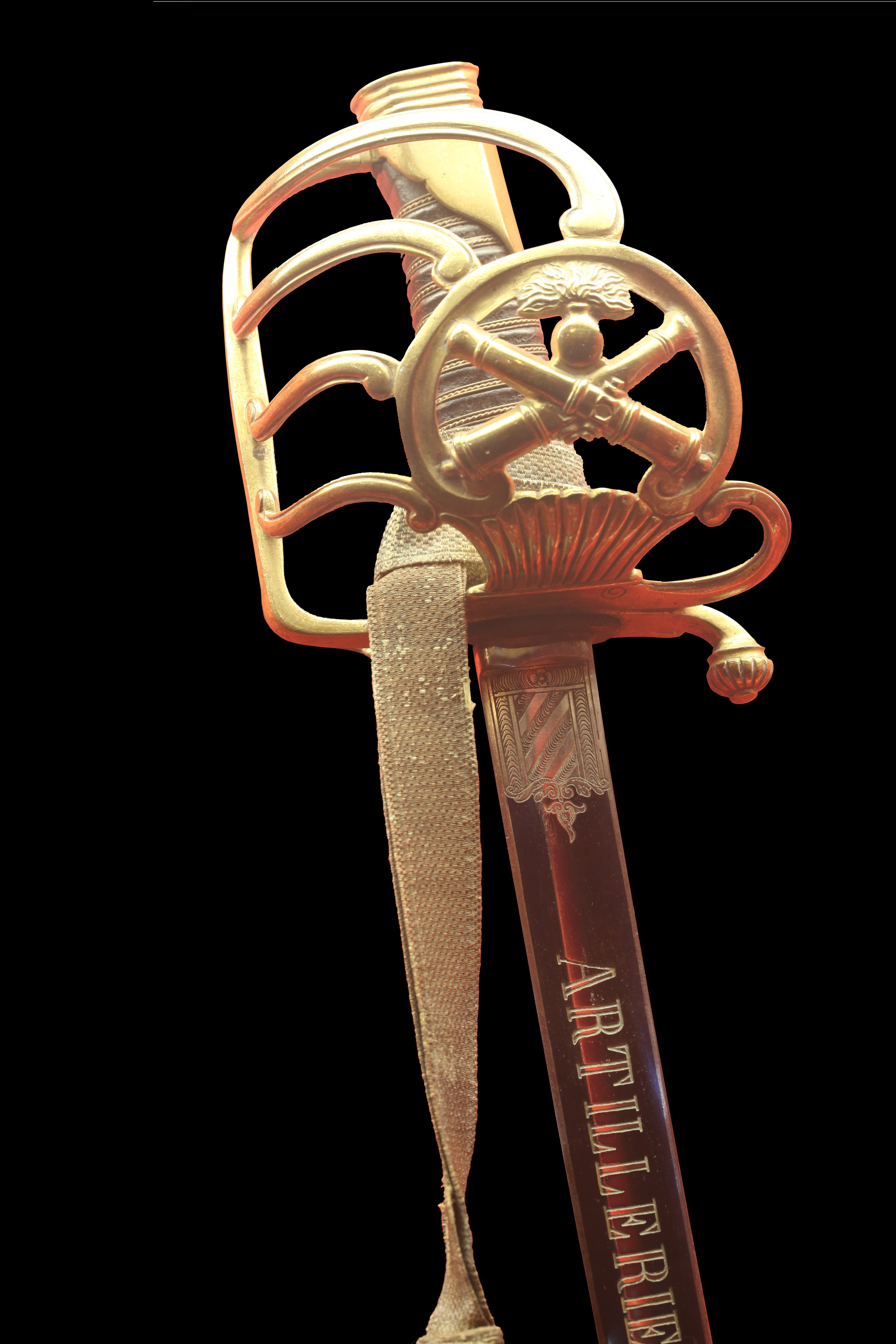
Sabre of the mounted artillery of the Guard (Musée d'Art et d'Histoire (Neuchâtel))

Artillery of the Guard included the Foot Artillery Regiment (Régiment d'Artillerie à Pied de la Garde Impériale) batteries, Horse Artillery Regiment (Régiment d'Artillerie à Cheval de la Garde Impériale) batteries, the Artillery Train of the Guard (Train d'Artillerie de la Garde Impériale) and the Artillery Park of the Guard (Parc d'Artillerie de la Garde Impériale), the latter two created in 1807. Despite shortages in artillery ordnance, in 1813 Napoleon created the Régiment d'Artillerie à Pied de la Garde Impériale of the Young Guard (Jeune Garde). The Parc du materiel de la Garde Impériale was created in 1813 to supplement the meager resources of the Bataillon du Train des équipages militaires after the losses of the 1812 campaign.

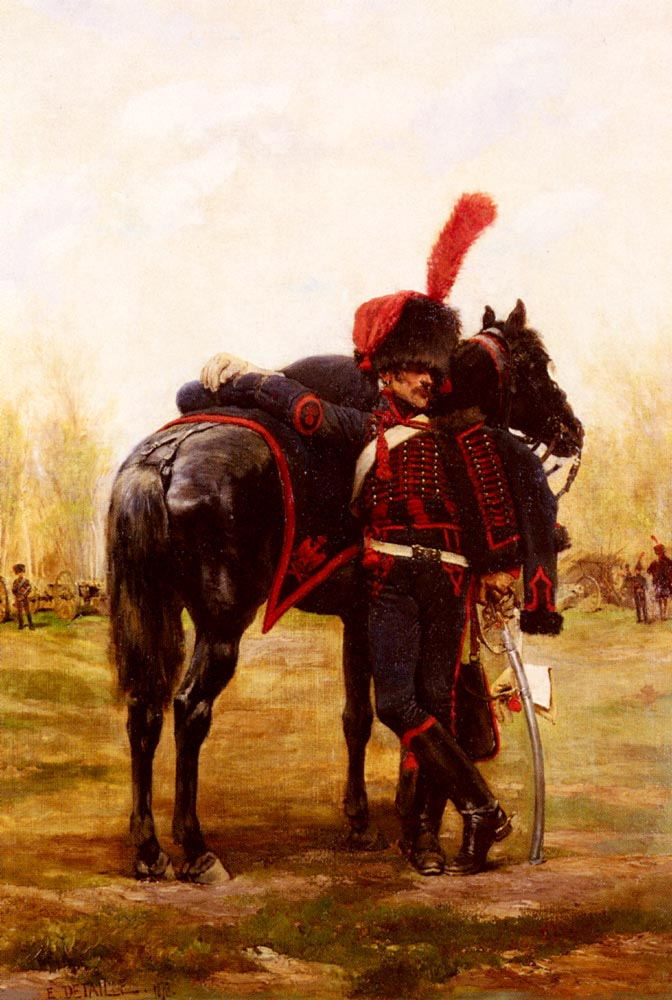
Gunner of the Horse Artillery of the Imperial Guard

== Engineers ==
Although not deployed in combat as a unit, the Engineers (Génie de la Garde Impériale) created in 1804 as the engineers of the Consular Guard, participated in combat more so than the combat units of the Guard which were usually held in reserve. By 1810 the Chief Engineer officer of the Guard had a company of Sapeurs de la Garde (140 sappers), all members of the Old Guard. In 1813 this was increased to two companies, and later one battalion of four companies totaling 400 sappers. The 1st and 2nd companies were classed as Old Guard, while the 3rd and 4th companies as the Young Guard.

== Sailors ==
Raised from sailors of the French navy who had distinguished themselves, the battalion of Marins wore a distinctive, elaborate uniform resembling that of the hussars. Their officers bore titles of rank derived from their seagoing compatriots, and the overall commander of the marines bore the rank of Capitaine de Vaisseau. Their duties included manning boats and other watercraft used by the Emperor. But ultimately the Marins De la Garde never saw official combat as their true purpose was for a proposed invasion of England which had never occurred.

== See also ==
- Imperial Guard (Napoleon III)
- Voltigeurs, skirmisher infantry. Some of whom served with the Imperial Guard (At times, the Guard had 12 regiments of Voltigeurs.).
- 94th Infantry Regiment, inheritor of the traditions of the Imperial Guard

== Bibliography ==
- Blond, Georges (1995). La Grande armée. Edison: Castle Books. ISBN 0-7858-1836-7.
- Bukhari, Emir (1978). Napoleon's Guard Cavalry. London: Osprey. ISBN 0-85045-288-0.
- Haythornthwaite, Philip J. Napoleon's military machine. London: Guild Publishing. ISBN 0946771669.
- Haythornthwaite, Philip (1985). Napoleon's Guard Infantry. Long Island City, NY: Osprey Publishing Ltd. ISBN 9781780969817.
- Head, Michael (1973). Foot Regiments of the Imperial Guard. New Malden: Almark Publishing. ISBN 0855240881.
