= Middle Guard (Napoleonic) =

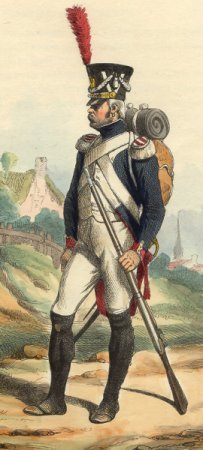
- Soldier of the Fusiliers-Grenadiers
- Active: 1806–1814, 1815
- Country: France
- Branch: French Imperial Army
- Part of: Imperial Guard
- Engagements: Napoleonic Wars: Peninsular War; Battle of Austerlitz; Battle of Wagram; Battle of Dresden; Battle of Ligny; French invasion of Russia; Battle of Borodino; Battle of Waterloo

Commanders
- Commander-in-chief: (First French Empire) Napoleon I
- Ceremonial chief: Napoleon
- Notable commanders: (First French Empire) Comte d'Erlon (First French Empire) Michel Ney (First French Empire) Jean Nicolas Houchard

The Middle Guard (French: Moyenne Garde) was a formation of the French Imperial Army's Imperial Guard. It was an intermediate force between the elite Old Guard and the less experienced Young Guard. It was used in Napoleon's military campaigns, often used as a balance of experience, and infantry flexibility.

== History ==
The Middle Guard, established between 1806, and 1808, composed mainly of veteran soldiers with at least three military campaigns of experience. The Middle Guard served as a seasoned reserve force, bridging the gap between the elite Old Guard, and the Young Guard. The Middle Guard were often deployed in middle of combat situtation or deliver decisive blows in battle. These units composed of veteran soldiers that probably were necessary for maintaining the flexibility, and effectiveness of Napoleon's army in campaigns, including the later stages of the Napoleonic Wars.

The Middle Guard, although less reputable than the Old Guard, enjoyed significant privileges such as better pay, rations, and living conditions. Their roles as a battlefield reserve and a symbol of Napoleon's power reflected their strategic and political importance during the Napoleonic Wars.

=== Peninsular War ===
During the Peninsular War from 1808 until 1814, the Middle Guard positioned between the Old Guard and the Young Guard. They are from the fusiliers chasseurs, and fusiliers grenadier regiments that goes onto action during key moments of the war, particularly in France's battles against British, and Portuguese forces. However, as the war dragged on, the Middle Guard faced increasingly difficult circumstances. Despite their past experience, and reputation, they were often deployed in the later stages of battles, when the French army was already stretched to its limits, and also faced retreat. At battles like Vimeiro (1808), Talavera (1809), and Busaco (1810), their role was overshadowed by the eventual dominance of the British forces under Arthur Wellesley command, who would later be known as the 1st Duke of Wellington.

By the end of the Peninsular War in 1814, the Imperial Guard, including the Middle Guard had suffered considerable losses. The continuous defeats and harsh campaigns against the coordinated Allied forces led to the weakening of Napoleon's forces as a whole.

=== Russian campaign ===
In 1812, Napoleon's Imperial Guard reached its peak strength, with approximately 56,000 men, including infantry, cavalry, and artillery units. This period marked the height of the Guard's power and influence, as it was heavily relied upon during the French invasion of Russia. The Guard played a crucial role in major battles, such as the Battle of Borodino, where its soldiers provided critical support in breaking the Russian resistance.

The Imperial Guard's artillery was significantly expanded during this time. This included a selection of various types from horse artillery to companies of foot artillery, and conscript cannons. These components enhanced the Guard's overall firepower, and mobility, making it a formidable force during combat.

However, the Middle Guard, along with the rest of Napoleon's forces, faced issues during the Russian campaign. The retreat from Moscow, coupled with logistic and extreme winter problems along with constant Russian attacks, led to the near destruction of many Guard units, including the Middle Guard. Despite the veterans' experience, the Guard's survival was hampered by overwhelming circumstances, marking a significant decline in its ranks. By the end of the campaign, the Imperial Guard's numbers had been reduced.

=== Hundred Days campaign ===
In 1814, before the Napoleon's exile, the remnants of the Middle Guard was within the forces that attempted to defend Paris against the advancing Coalition forces. However, the Guard was undermanned, and also exhausted, making it unable to withstand the opposition. Napoleon's forces were no match for the well-equipped, and superior in number Allied armies, eventually leading to Fall of Paris, and Napoleon's abdication to Elba.

During the Battle of Waterloo in 1815, the Middle Guard's final combat began when Napoleon ordered them deployed in a decisive assault against the allied forces commanded by Wellington. However, they were greatly inferior in numbers, and this attack failed in large part because the Prussians/Blücher forces helped Wellington on the battlefield, drawing away the reserves the emperor needed to break through the Anglo-allies, which led to the end of Napoleon's ambitions. Despite their reputation, the Middle Guard and the rest of the Guard could not overcome the strong defensive positions, and reinforcements of the Allies.

== Formation ==
Between 1806 and 1808, the Imperial Guard significantly expanded, eventually forming two regiments each of grenadiers, and chasseurs. The service requirements for soldiers in the second regiments were reduced to eight years, allowing for a wider pool of experienced recruits.

The artillery also experienced growth and development during this period. In 1806, a regiment of horse artillery (consisting of six companies), and a battalion of trained troops were added. By 1808, the artillery arm had been further expanded, although the horse Artillery of the Imperial Guard was reduced to 32 guns. At the same time, the three companies of foot artillery, and three companies of conscript cannon were established, then eventually evolving into the Young Guard artillery companies.

The classification of the Old Guard, Middle Guard, and Young Guard often caused confusion, as it depended on the length of service, and the soldiers' experiences within the Guard hierarchy. The Young Guard is considered the best of the annual intake of conscripts, and volunteer soldiers, while known as the lowest among the guard, were still better than a regular line infantry regiment. The Middle Guard was composed of veterans of Napoleon's campaigns in 1805–1809, while the Old Guard was composed entirely of seasoned veterans from Napoleon's earliest campaigns, still following him in any campaigns.

Historians first used the term of Middle Guard in the 19th–20th century. The Old Guards (Vieille Garde), and Young Guards (Jeune Garde) were referred to in the Napoleonic wars, but the Middle Guard was not an official division or class in the Imperial Guard.

=== Regiment ===
==== Fusiliers Chasseurs/1er Régiment de Fusiliers de la Garde Impériale ====
The Fusiliers were formed in 1806 from selected conscripts taken from infantry, and from departamental reserve companies. They have few requirement to get into the guards such as 173 cm height requirement. The Fusiliers came from the battalions of Velites, while officers from the foot grenadiers, and foot chasseurs.

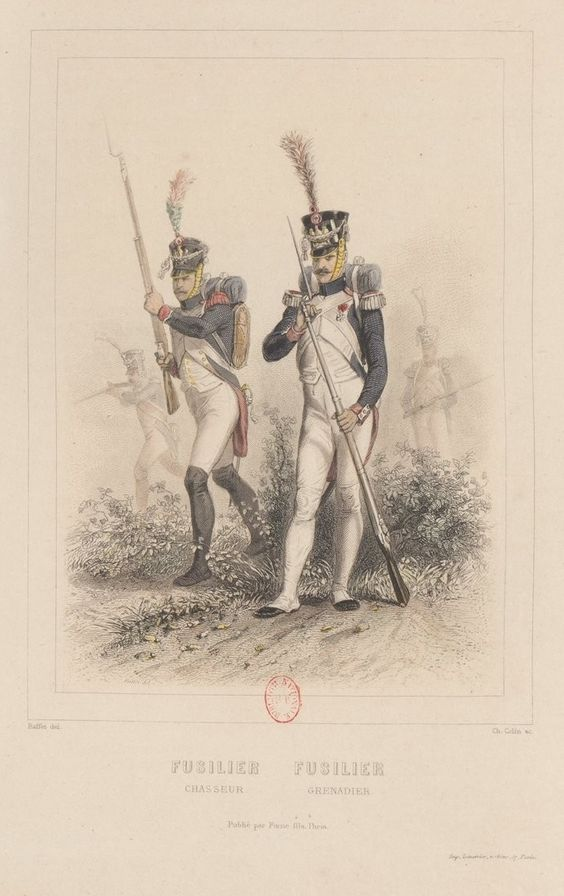
Fusiliers-Grenadiers, and Fusiliers-Chasseurs.

==== Fusiliers Grenadiers/2e Régiment de Fusiliers de la Garde Impériale ====
The Fusiliers-Grenadiers were the second regiment of Fusiliers, established In 1807 the 2nd Fusiliers had been formed from conscripts, and soon it was renamed to Fusiliers-Grenadiers by combining the 1st battalions of the Grenadier, and Chasseur Vélites. Initially, the regiment was meant to have a strength of 1,800 men. After conscripts and soldiers from the Compagnies de Reserve joined, it grew to four battalions, each consisting of four companies with 120 men per company.

Until 1811 both units of Fusiliers became part of the Middle Guard. There was an order that the Fusiliers were to be replaced with voltigeurs, and tirailleurs of the Young Guard with two years of service, and some education they have. Napoleon said that the most distinguished, and smart Fusiliers with four years of service or citation for gallantry should be admitted to the Old Guard. The regiment later disbanded on 12 May 1814.

There are a few additional regiments of the Middle Guard such as the 3e régiment de grenadiers à pied, 4e régiment de grenadiers à pied, 3e régiment de chasseurs à pied, and 4e régiment de chasseurs à pied.

== See also ==
- Imperial Guard (Napoleon I)
- Peninsular War
- Old Guard (France)
