= Old Guard (France) =

Formation of the French Imperial Army's Imperial Guard

- Vieille garde
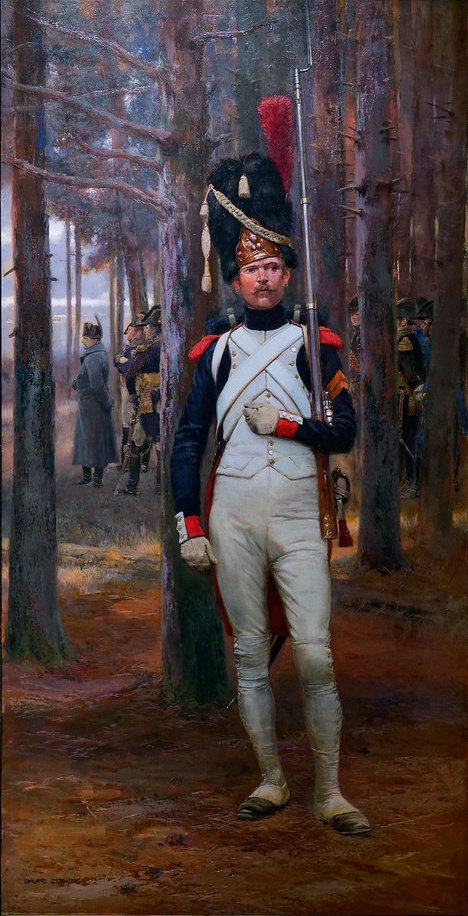
- An Old Guard grenadier wearing two veteran chevrons representing 15 to 20 years of service
- Active: 1804–1815
- Country: France
- Branch: Army
- Engagements: Napoleonic Wars: Battle of Austerlitz; Battle of Wagram; Battle of Dresden; Battle of Ligny; Battle of Waterloo

Commanders
- Notable commanders: Dorsenne; Bessières; Davout; Soult; Cambronne

The Old Guard (French: Vieille garde) was a formation of the French Army's Imperial Guard. Consisting exclusively of veteran troops, it was the most prestigious formation in Napoleon's Grande Armée. French soldiers often referred to Napoleon's Old Guard as "the Immortals". The Napoleonic Imperial Guard is collectively mentioned as the "elite of the elite".

Famously devoted to the Emperor, who even referred to them as "my children"; the members of his Old Guard were selected based on physical traits, most notably above-average height. Their imposing stature was likely impressive to foes and allies alike. Awards as well as veterancy were also taken into consideration when selecting troops for the Old Guard.

== Infantry ==
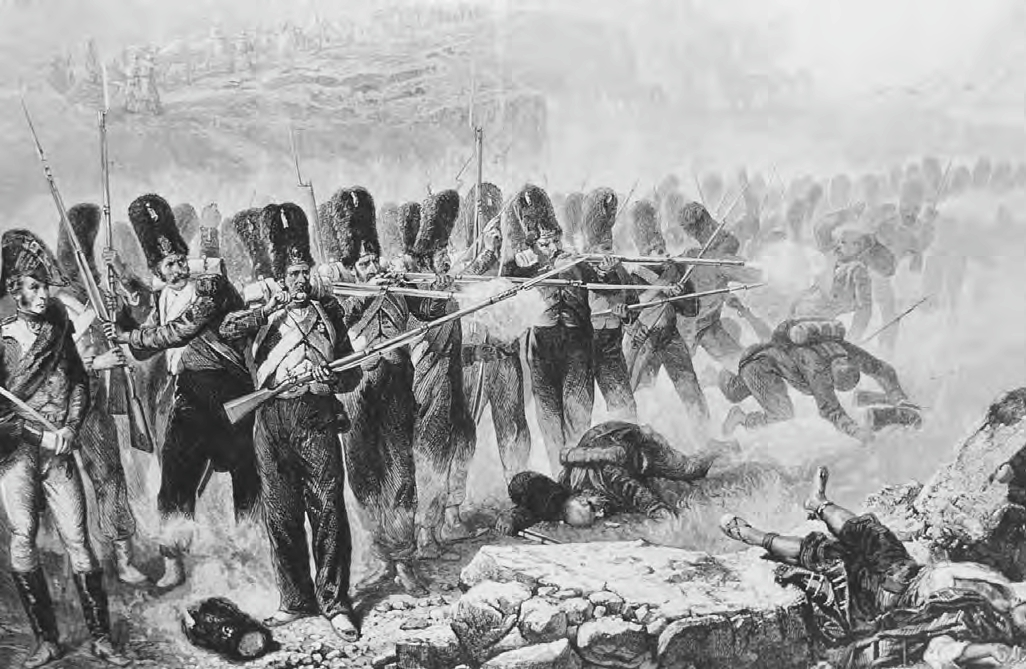
1st Regiment of Foot Grenadiers of the Old Guard Wearing their distinctive bearskin caps while fighting in the Six Days Campaign. Napoleon's Old Guard was the most celebrated and most feared elite military formation of its day.

There were four regiments of the Old Guard infantry: 1st and 2nd each of grenadiers and chasseurs. Members of the Old Guard benefitted from a number of different privileges, including considerably increased wages from the Imperial Guard.

=== Requirements for Old Guard Soldiers ===
- under 35 years of age at entry
- at least 10 years of service
- at least three campaigns (some had fought in as many as 12 campaigns)
- had to have faced enemy fire at the front
- had to be 5 feet 8 inches (1.73 m) for the Chasseurs and 5 feet 10 inches (1.78 m) for the Grenadiers (no height requirement for those awarded the Legion of Honor)

In 1814 the 1st Chasseurs still had many veterans: for example Sapper Rothier with 21 years of service and two wounds; Private Stoll with 22 years of service and 20 campaigns. However, the Old Guard was generally not filled to the brim with old men; in fact those who were too old, or crippled, were sent to the Company of Veterans in Paris, which was full of elderly soldiers, some lacking an arm, others striped with saber cuts.

Each member of the Old Guard was a highly trained and experienced soldier and they formed a formidable sight on the battlefield when mustered into regiments; they were taught to fight unlike any other soldier in the French army. Any cowardly tendencies or otherwise cautious habits would be thoroughly purged through intense training, which often included advanced bayonet and hand-to-hand combat techniques. The Old Guard earned its fearsome reputation through the many military engagements of the Napoleonic Wars, from the Battle of Austerlitz, to the Battle of Dresden, to the famous and final Battle of Waterloo (June 1815).

== Cavalry ==
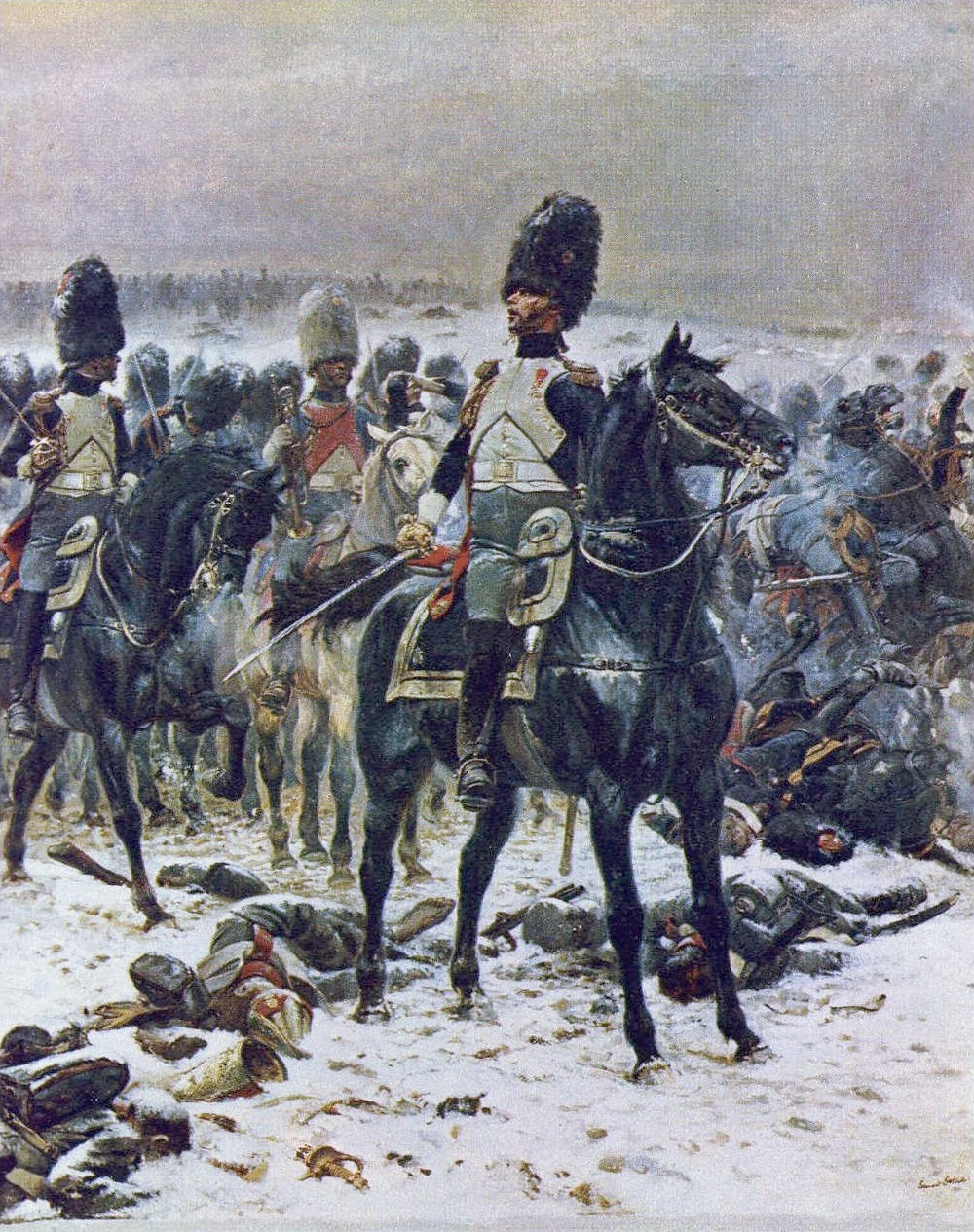
Grenadier Cavalry of the Old Guard during the Battle of Eylau by Édouard Detaille

There were four regiments of Old Guard cavalry: the Grenadiers à Cheval (mounted grenadiers), Chasseurs à Cheval (mounted hunters), Dragons de l'Impératrice (the Empress's Dragoons), and the 1st Polish Lancers.

The Mamelukes of the Imperial Guard squadron was also considered part of the Old Guard cavalry.

The Gendarmes d'élite (elite Gendarmes) was counted as Old Guard cavalry. It was deployed in detachments as escorts for Napoleon's headquarters and the General Staff of the Guard, and for Imperial Guard field camps.

== Les Grognards ==
Another privilege reserved only for the members of the Old Guard was the freedom to express their discontent freely: the Old Guard Grenadiers were known as "the Grumblers" (French: les Grognards) because they openly complained about the petty troubles of military life. Jean-Roch Coignet, a captain of the Imperial Guard, claimed that this term was coined in the aftermath of severe hardships the unit encountered during the War of the Fourth Coalition and it has been mentioned that this nickname was coined by Napoleon himself. Some of the officers even complained in the presence of the Emperor, knowing that the Old Guard's reputation commanded enough respect with Napoleon to allow such openness; such behavior was unique to the Old Guard and would have been severely punished were it engaged in by a member of any other unit.

On the other hand, they were strictly supervised in aspects such as the state of their uniforms or the height and presentation of their horses, and severely punished or reprimanded for any failures in those regards.

== Dissolution ==
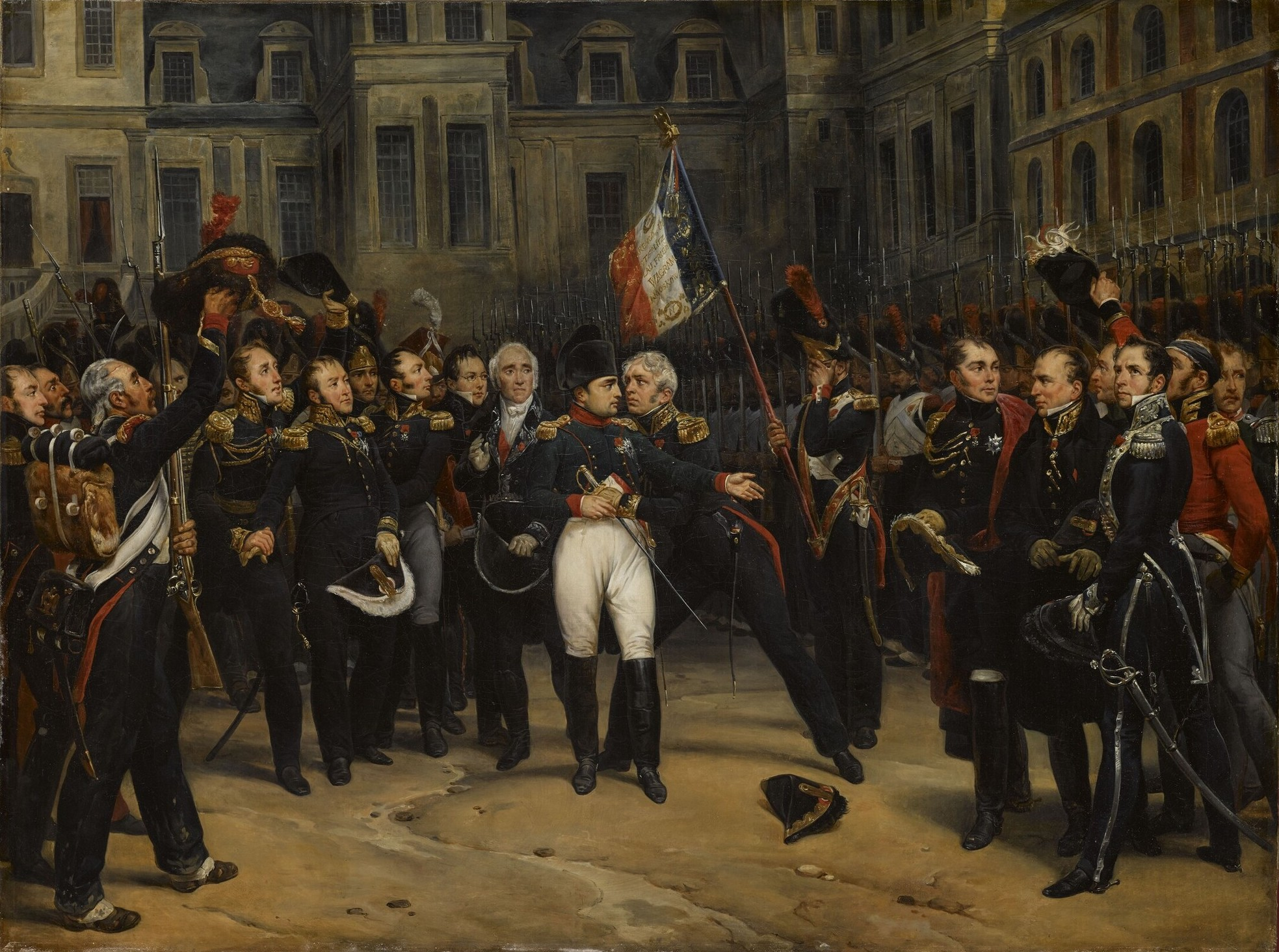
Napoleon saying goodbye to the Old Guard at the Palace of Fontainebleau, after his first abdication (1814)

The Old Guard was disbanded by the victorious Sixth Coalition in 1814, along with the rest of the Imperial Guard; and Napoleon bade them an emotional farewell at the Palace of Fontainebleau after his first abdication where many of them cheered at him and cried.

During Napoleon's 1815 return from exile, the Old Guard was reformed, and fought at the Battle of Waterloo, where the 2e Régiment de Grenadiers-à-Pied was pivotal in the defense of the village of Plancenoit against the Prussians. The 1er Regiment, charged with protecting the field position around Napoleon himself, served as a rear guard after the failure of the attack of the Middle Guard on the Anglo-allied center. The Old Guard cavalry was involved in the unsuccessful midday charges against Anglo-allied infantry, and was unavailable at the battle's decisive moments.

In August 1815, Louis XVIII ordered the Imperial Guard abolished. By December, all the Old Guard regiments were disbanded. Ex-guardsmen ended up in a variety of places after their units' disbandment. Some re-enlisted into the king's army but most lived out their lives watched with suspicion by Bourbon police. When Napoleon's body was returned to France in 1840, many of the surviving Old Guard paraded in their original, now-threadbare uniforms.

== Gallery ==
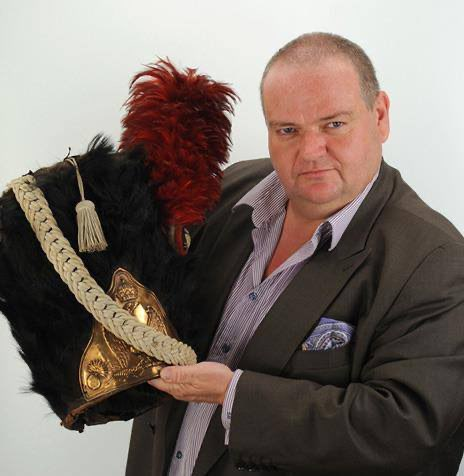
Bertrand Malvaux holding a 1st Regiment of Foot Grenadiers of the Old Guard bearskin (1811 Pattern)

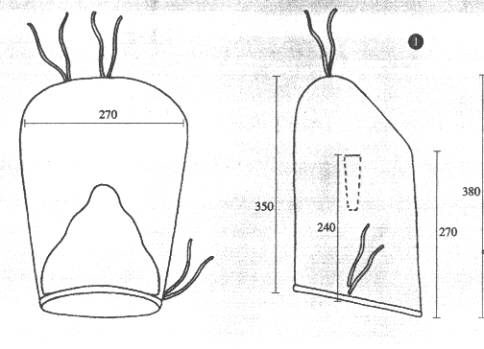
The 1811 1st Regiment of Foot Grenadiers of the Old Guard bearskin.

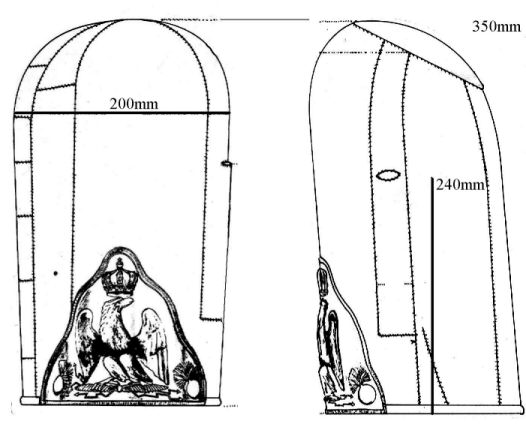
The 1804/6 Pattern 1st Regiment of Foot Grenadiers of the Old Guard bearskin.

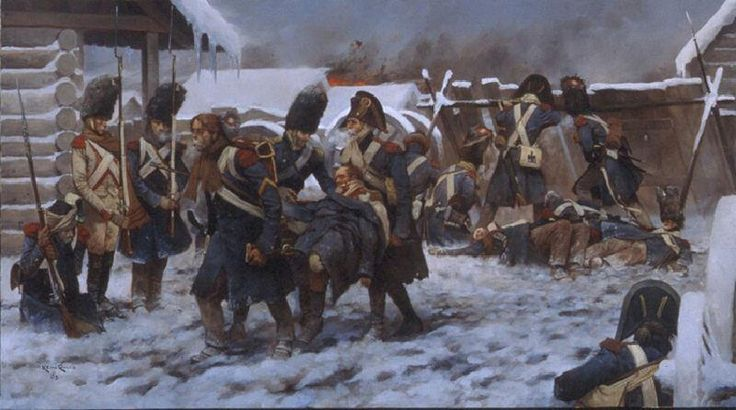
The 3rd Regiment of Foot Grenadiers of the Old Guard retreating from Moscow, 1812.

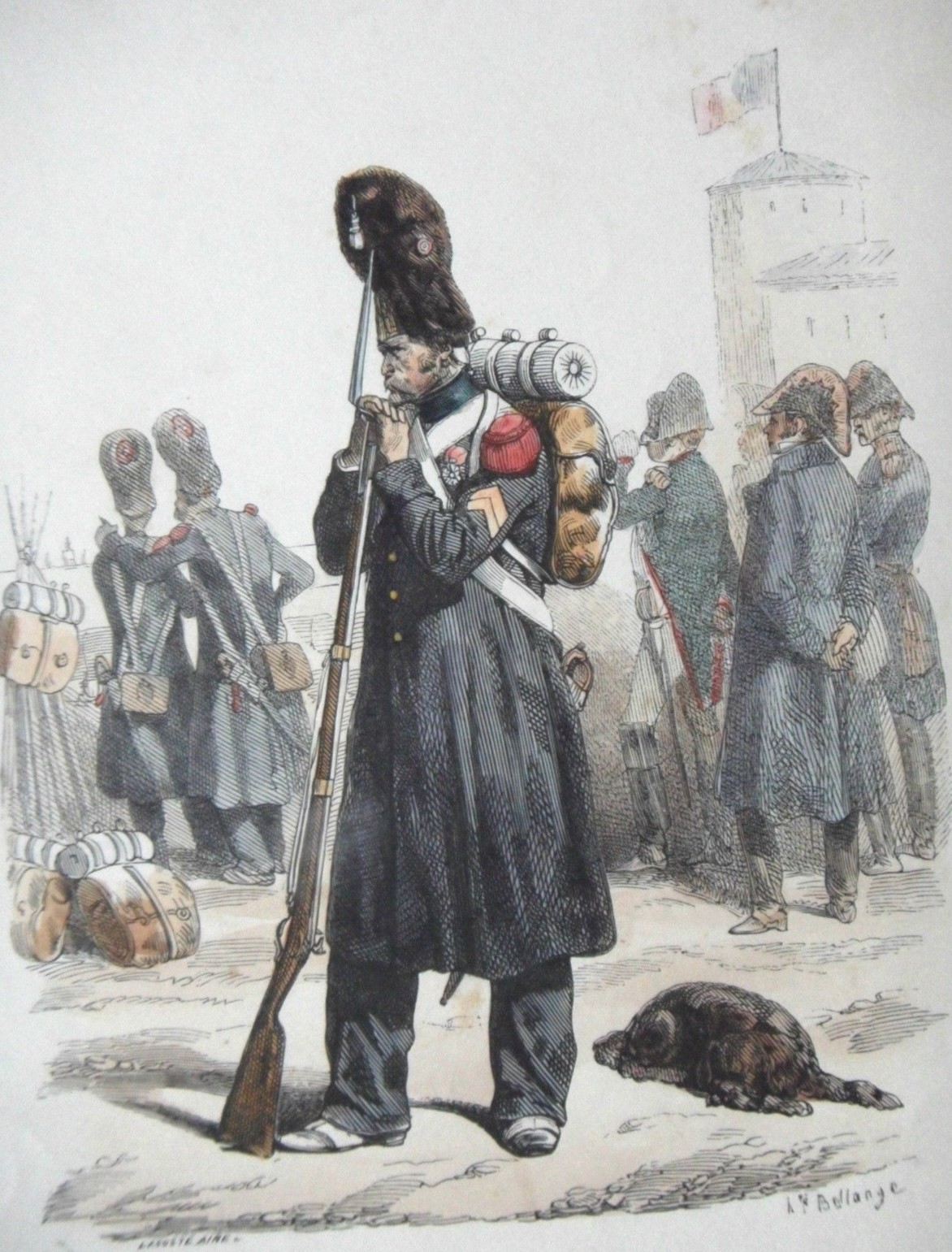
1st Regiment of Foot Grenadiers of the Old Guard in his great coat.

== See also ==
- Consular Guard
- Imperial Guard (Napoleon III)

== Bibliography ==
- Lachouque, Henri (2015) [1961]. Brown, Anne S.K. (ed.). The Anatomy of Glory: Napoleon and His Guard. Translated by Anne S.K. Brown (5th ed.). Auckland, New Zealand: Pickle Partners Publishing. ISBN 9781786255822 – via Google Books.
- Headley, J.T. (1851). Scribner, Charles (ed.). The imperial guard of Napoleon: From Marengo to Waterloo. New York City, New York: C. Scribner. LCCN 04021545. OCLC 679311339 – via Google Books.
- Coignet, Jean-Roch (1 August 1929) [1928]. Fortescue, John (ed.). The Note-Books of Captain Coignet: Soldier of the Empire (2nd ed.). New York City, New York: Robert M. McBride & Company – via Archive.org.
- Sokolov, Oleg (2006). Аустерлиц. Наполеон, Россия и Европа, 1799–1805 гг. CIP РГБ (in Russian). Vol. 1. Moscow: Рус. импульс. ISBN 5-90252521-7.
