= Napoléon Bessières =

French politician

Napoléon Bessières, 2nd Duke of Istria (2 August 1802, Paris - 21 July 1856, Arnouville-les-Gonesse) was a French politician.

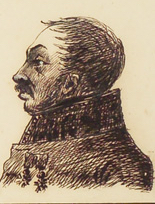
Napoléon Bessières

== Life ==
His father marshal Jean-Baptiste Bessières died in battle at Lützen in 1813, leaving the family nothing but his debts. Napoleon I wrote to his widow that Bessières' children "inherited the affection I bore for their father" and left Napoléon Bessières 100,000 francs in his will. Louis XVIII also rewarded Bessières' services by making Napoléon Bessières a peer of France on 17 August 1815 (to take his seat when he reached the age prescribed by the 1814 charter) and confirming his inheritance of his father's title of Duke of Istrie by a royal decree of 31 August 1817.

On 28 June 1828 Napoléon Bessières took his place in the Chamber of Peers and he supported Louis Philippe I's government. In 1826 he married Mathilde Louise Lagrange (1809-1873), daughter of Joseph Lagrange, though the couple later separated without children. In his will of 30 June 1853 he left the Musée d'artillerie two cannon captured at Medina-del-Rio-Secco on 14 July 1808, along with an Arab sabre and other weapons he had acquired from the Order of St John of Jerusalem.

== Sources ==
- http://www.culture.gouv.fr/public/mistral/leonore_fr?ACTION=CHERCHER&FIELD_1=COTE&VALUE_1=LH%2F224%2F12
