= Joseph Lagrange (soldier) =

French soldier

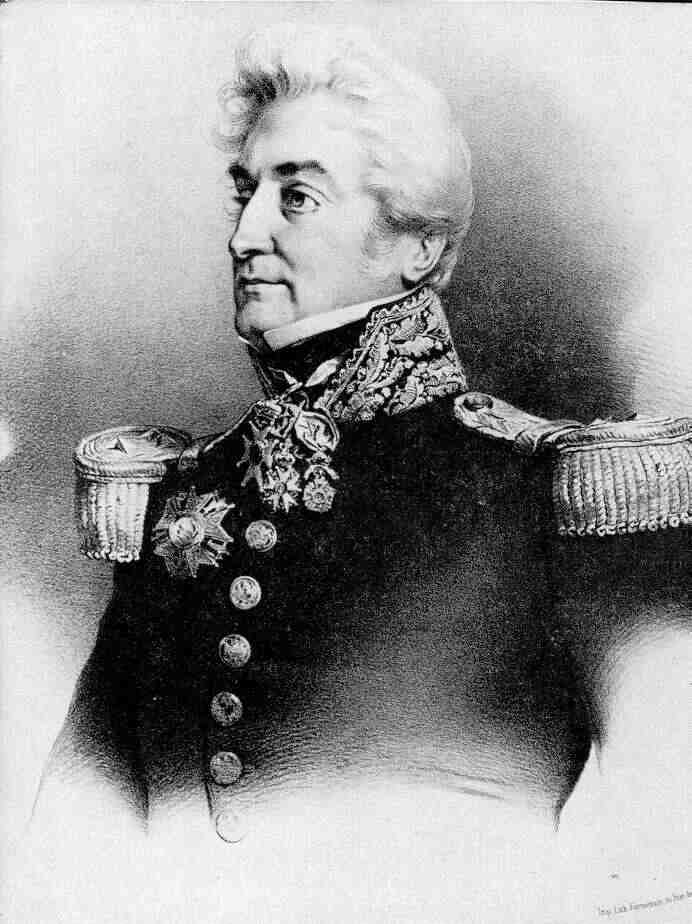
- General Count Joseph Lagrange.
- Born: 10 January 1763; Sempesserre, France
- Died: 16 January 1836 (aged 73) Paris, France
- Allegiance: (France) French First Republic, (France) First French Empire, Kingdom of Westphalia; Bourbon Restoration
- Branch: Infantry
- Service years: 1791–1815
- Rank: Général de Division
- Conflicts: French Revolutionary Wars; Napoleonic Wars
- Awards: Count of the Empire 1810
- Other work: Inspector General of Gendarmerie

Count Joseph Lagrange (French pronunciation: [ʒozɛf laɡʁɑ̃ʒ]; 10 January 1763 – 16 January 1836) was a French soldier who rose through the ranks and gained promotion to the rank of general officer during the French Revolutionary Wars, subsequently pursuing a successful career during the Napoleonic Wars and winning promotion to the top military rank of General of Division. His name is inscribed on the west side of the arc de triomphe de l'Étoile. He later became a politician in Gers department – in its capital of Auch there is a portrait of him in the town museum and the gendarmerie barracks was named after him in January 2002.

== Life ==
=== Revolutionary Wars ===
He was the son of Armand Lagrange, a merchant, and his wife Marianne Baruit. He became mayor of Lectoure in 1791 but three years later joined the army as a captain in the 2nd Gers Volunteer Battalion, fighting in Carinthia and in Tyrol during the 1796 and 1797 Italian campaigns. Rising rapidly through the ranks, he was chosen by Bonaparte to take part in the French invasion of Egypt. He fought in Egypt and Syria and rose to brigadier general on 14 July 1798. He entered Cairo at the head of the vanguard and distinguished himself at the siege of El Arish, the Siege of Acre and the Battle of Heliopolis. On his return from Egypt he was made inspector general of the gendarmerie and a général de division, before being put in command of the 14th Military Division on 23 September 1800. He was made a knight of the Légion d'honneur on 11 December 1803, rising to grand officer on 14 June 1804.

=== Napoleonic Wars ===
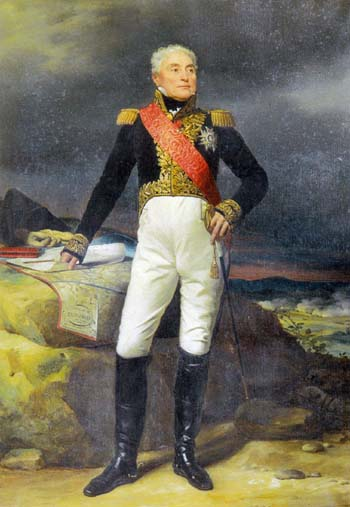
1824 portrait of Lagrange by Michel Martin Drolling

On 11 January 1805 Lagrange departed from Rochefort as commander of the troops embarked on a French squadron under Édouard Thomas Burgues de Missiessy. The squadron had embarked 3,500 troops along with several artillery pieces and large quantities of small arms and military supplies to reinforce the French garrisons at Martinique and Guadeloupe. Missiessy's squadron arrived at Martinique on 20 February and was forced to make a detour due to the British controlling Diamond Rock. Missiessy was unable to convinced Lagrange or Governor Louis Thomas Villaret de Joyeuse to attack the rock, and it was instead agreed that Lagrange's troops would invade Dominica.

On 22 February French troops landed on the island and captured the colonial capital of Roseau. However, the outnumbered British garrison put up fierce resistance and when Lagrange's troops failed to capture Prince Rupert Fort the French withdrew from the island on 25 February. Returning to Europe in early 1806, he was put in command of a division sent to Holland and contributed to the success of the 1806 Prussian campaign against the elector of Hesse-Cassel under the command of Maréchal Mortier. He was a member of the committee which organized the Kingdom of Westphalia and so became minister of war and chief of staff to its first king, Jérôme Bonaparte.

In 1808 he was summoned to fight in the Peninsular War, where he fought in the attack on Lascanti on 18 November before pursuing the enemy to Terracina. Under Maréchal Lannes he contributed to the victory at the Battle of Tudela and the major losses it inflicted on Castaños. He was ordered to Germany in 1809 to command Charles I, Grand Duke of Baden's contingent. On 26 April 1810 he was made a count of the empire. He was made governor of Haute-Souabe at the start of the French invasion of Russia in 1812 and also commander of a division in 9th Army Corps. In 1813 he moved to maréchal Marmont's corps, fighting in the siege of Hoertel, the marshlands of Bobinsk, the Battle of Dresden and the Battle of Leipzig. He also distinguished himself in the French campaign of 1814, notably in the Battle of Lesmont on 2 February 1814 and the Battle of Champaubert on 10 February 1814, where he was severely wounded in the head.

=== Politician ===
He retired to Gisors when Napoleon first fell and did not come out of retirement for the Hundred Days. He became president of Gers' electoral college in 1817 and was elected as that department's deputy on 20 September, by 513 out of 797 votes. He sat in the Royalist majority and was made inspector general of the gendarmerie again in 1818. On 1 May 1821 he was made a Grand Cross of the Légion d'honneur.

He took no part in the July Revolution of 1830. Louis Philippe I's government appointed him to the Chamber of Peers on 9 November 1831 and allowed him to retire on 11 June 1832 at the rank of lieutenant general. He sat with the ministerial majority in the upper chamber until his death.

== Marriage and issue ==
On 6 November 1802 he married Marie de Talhouët (1786–1849) in the 1st arrondissement of Paris. She was the eldest daughter of Louis Céleste de Talhouët-Bonamour (1761–1812), marquis de Talhouët, and his wife Élisabeth Baude de La Vieuville (1764–1814). They had issue:

1. Napoléon Joseph (1804–1812);
2. Caroline Élisabeth (1806–1870), in 1824 married Louis Alix de Nompère de Champagny (1796–1870), 2nd duke of Cadore, son of Jean-Baptiste Nompère de Champagny, with issue;
3. Mathilde Louise (1809–1873), in 1826 married Napoléon Bessières (1802–1856), 2nd duke of Istrie, son of maréchal Bessières;
4. Emma (1810–1876), married Charles Ferron de La Ferronays (1805–1863), comte de La Ferronays, with issue;
5. Frédéric (1815–1883), in 1850 married Émilie de Riquet de Caraman (1832–1851), daughter of prince Joseph de Riquet de Caraman (1808-1886), without issue.
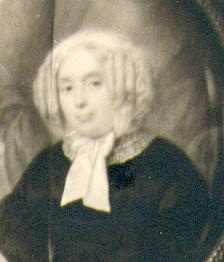
Marie de Talhouët-Bonamour (1786-1849)

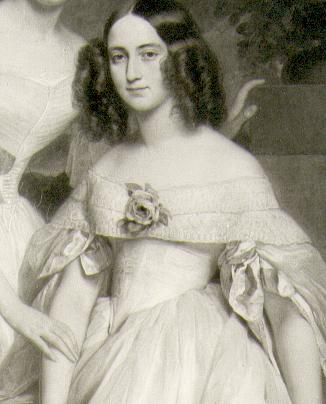
Caroline Elisabeth Lagrange (1806-1870), wife of the 2nd duke of Cadore, Franz Xaver Winterhalter, 1821

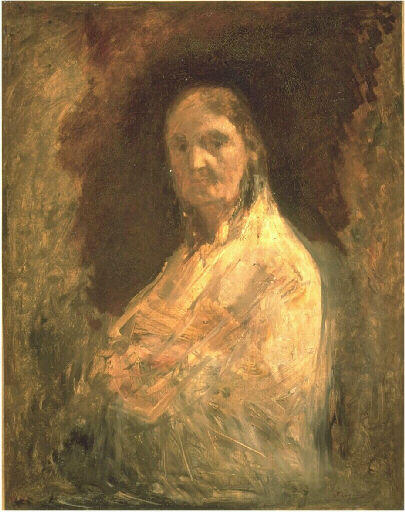
Caroline Elisabeth Lagrange, Jean-Baptiste Carpeaux, c 1861

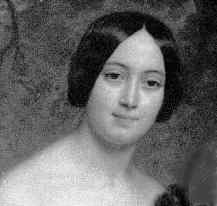
Emma Lagrange (1810-1876), Franz Xaver Winterhalter, 1821

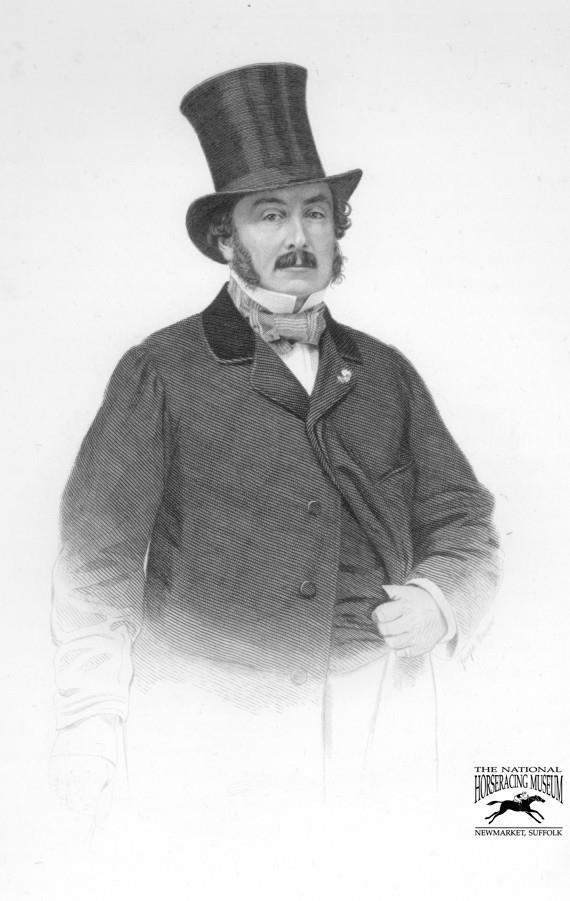
Frederic Lagrange (1815-1883), 2nd count of Lagrange, National Horseracing Museum, Newmarket (Suffolk)

== Bibliography ==
- Mullié, Charles (1852). "LAGRANGE (JOSEPH, comte)" . Biographie des célébrités militaires des armées de terre et de mer de 1789 à 1850 (in French). Paris: Poignavant et Compagnie.
- "Joseph Lagrange (soldier)", in Adolphe Robert and Gaston Cougny, Dictionnaire des parlementaires français (1789–1891), Bourloton, Paris, 1889 Edition details Wikisource;
- L'Expédition aux Antilles du Général Lagrange en 1805 par Paul Jeannin-Naltet. Société Historique du Gers. 2e Trimestre 1982
