= Julien Bessières =

French scientist and diplomat

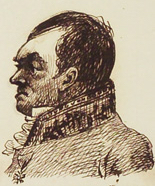
- Born: 30 July 1777; Gramat, Lot, France
- Died: 30 July 1840 (aged 63)
- Other names: Chevalier Bessières et de l'Empire
- Relatives: Jean-Baptiste Bessières, Bertrand Bessières, cousins
- Awards: Legion of Honour, Chevalier de l'Empire
- Scientific career
- Fields: Traveller, diplomat, politician
- Institutions: Venice, Corfu, Navarre, Gers, Aveyron

Henri Géraud Julien, Chevalier Bessières et de l'Empire (30 July 1777, Gramat, Lot – 30 July 1840, Paris) was a French scientist and diplomat. He was a cousin of marshal Jean-Baptiste Bessières and Bertrand Bessières.

== Life ==
He was a member of the Commission des Sciences et des Arts during Napoleon's invasion of Egypt but fell ill and had to return to France on board the Livornese tartane Madona di Montenego, setting sail on 26 October 1798. Among his travelling companions on the voyage back were his fellow Commission members François Pouqueville and P. S. Girard, as well as the engineers officer Jean Étienne Casimir Poitevin de Maureilhan and the artillery officer Joseph Claude Marie Charbonnel. The ship was attacked and captured by the Albanian pirate Ourochs, who took its passengers prisoner and sold them separately to various Ottoman officials. Bessières Poitevin and Charbonnel were sold to Ali Pasha and in 1800 the three men were imprisoned in the Fortezza Nuova on Corfu, from which they escaped on the night of 21/22 November that year. They got back to France and on arrival Bessières was made director of droits réunis for the Hautes-Alpes (1803).

In 1804 he went back to meet Ali Pasha, becoming his agent, and in 1805 he was made France's consul general to Venice. From 1807 to 1810 he served as French imperial commissaire (i.e. in charge of all civilian affairs of the French-ruled Ionian Islands) back on Corfu. He then served as intendant of Navarre, préfet of Gers (1813), préfet of the Aveyron (15 July 1814) then préfet of the Ariège (Hundred Days). Also during the First Empire he became a commander of the Legion of Honour and a Chevalier de l'Empire.

Under the Bourbon Restoration he was elected as the député for the Dordogne in 1827, adhering to the constitutional royalist party. He was re-elected in 1830 under the July Monarchy but then beaten in the 1831 elections, and only returned to the Chambre on 21 June 1834 after being elected by two circonscriptions – his 'fiefdom' of Sarlat and Figeac in Lot. An ordinance of 3 October 1837 made him a peer of France and on his death in 1840 he was buried in the Père Lachaise cemetery.

== Sources ==
- (in French) Francois Pouqueville, Voyage en Morée, à Constantinople, en Albanie, et dans plusieurs autres parties de l'Empire Ottoman (Paris, 1805, 3 vol. in-8°), translated into English and German
- (in French) Dr. Vincent, "Les Français à Corfou. L'arrivée.", in Revue des Études napoléoniennes., vol XXX, January–June 1930.
- "Julien Bessières", in Adolphe Robert and Gaston Cougny, Dictionnaire des parlementaires français (1789–1891), Bourloton, Paris, 1889 Edition details Wikisource
