= Bertrand Bessières =

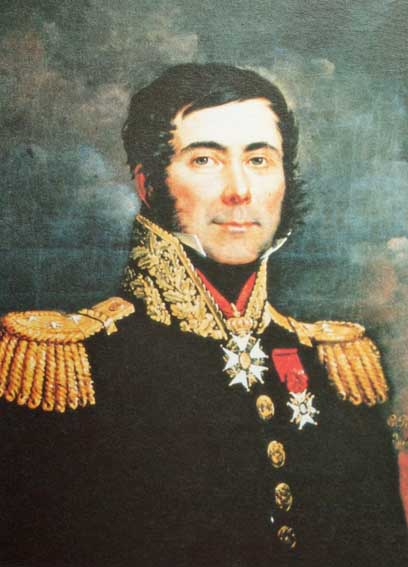
- Born: 6 January 1773; Prayssac, Kingdom of France
- Died: 15 November 1855 (aged 82); Chantilly, Second French Empire
- Relatives: Jean-Baptiste Bessières (brother)
- Military career
- Allegiance: First French Republic; First French Empire
- Branch: (French First Republic) Revolutionary Army (First French Empire) Imperial Army
- Rank: Général de brigade
- Conflicts: French Revolutionary Wars; Napoleonic Wars; Peninsular War; Battle of Borodino; Battle of Leipzig

Bertrand, 1st Baron Bessières (born 6 January 1773 in Prayssac; died 15 November 1855 in Chantilly), was a French general of the Napoleonic Wars. He was the younger brother of Marshal Jean-Baptiste Bessières, Duke of Istria.

== Biography ==
After serving with a good record in Italy, in Egypt and at Hohenlinden, Bertrand Bessières had a command in the Grande Armée, fought at Austerlitz and was subsequently promoted to brigadier general. In 1808 was sent to Spain, where he under General Duhesme in Catalonia and played a notable part at the Battle of Molins de Rei near Barcelona.

Disagreements with his superior, led to his resignation, but he subsequently served with Napoleon in all the later campaigns of the empire and was wounded at Borodino and Leipzig.

His last public act was his defence of the unfortunate Marshal Ney. Placed on the retired list by the restored Bourbons, he spent the rest of his long life in retirement.

Bertrand, B is one of the many names inscribed Arc De Triomphe.
