= Battle of Lesmont =

1814 battle during the War of the Sixth Coalition

- Part of the Campaign of France of the Sixth Coalition
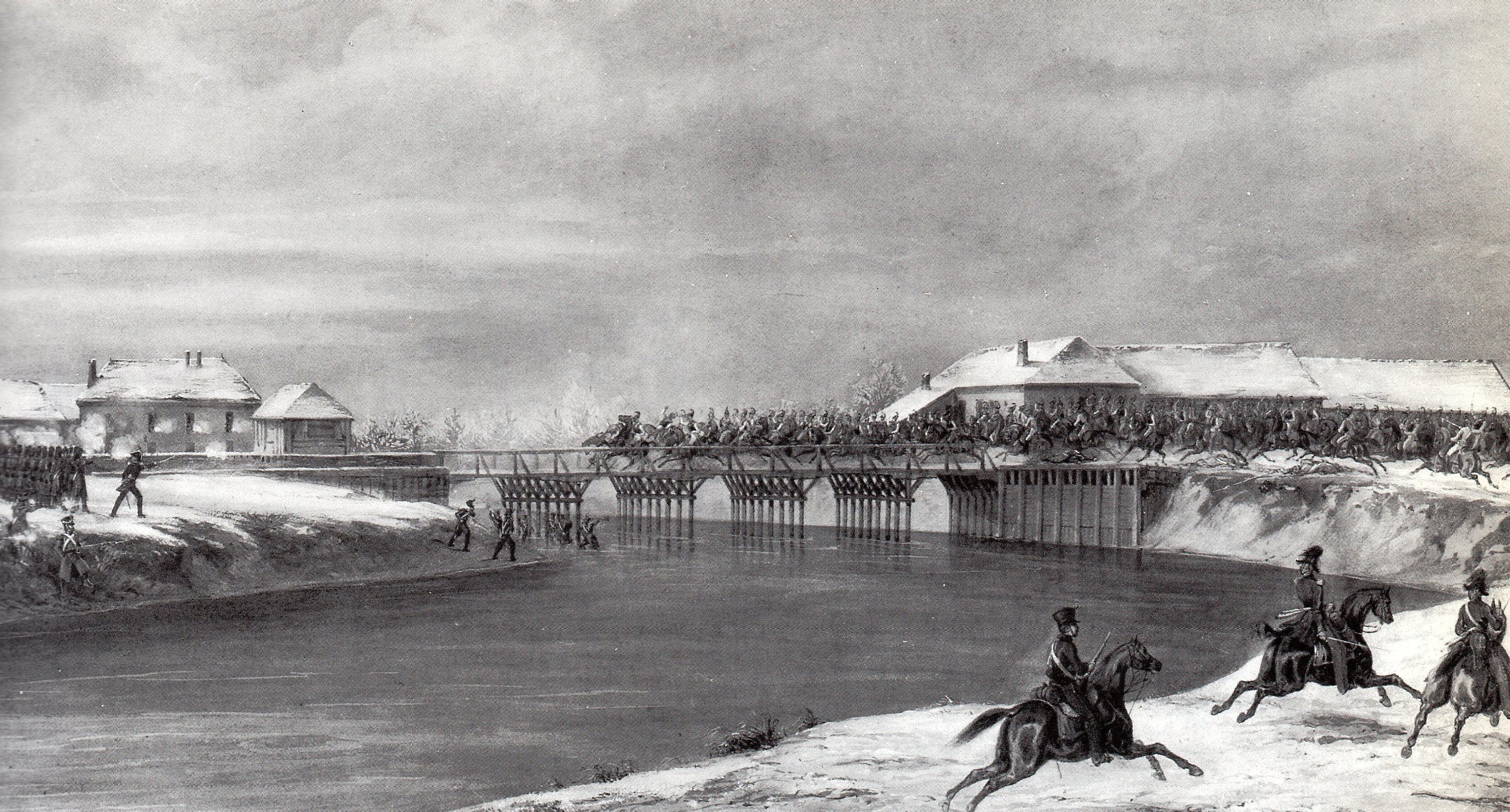
- Painting of the battle by Théodore Young, showing French sappers mining the first arch of the bridge and Lagrange's infantry repulsing Eugen's cavalry
Date	2 February 1814
Location	Lesmont, French Empire 48°25′42″N 4°24′55″E
Result	French victory

Belligerents
(First French Empire) France	(Kingdom of Bavaria) Bavaria (Russian Empire) Russia

Commanders and leaders
(First French Empire) Joseph Lagrange	(Kingdom of Bavaria) Karl Philipp von Wrede (Russian Empire) Eugen of Württemberg

Strength
4,500 men	Unknown

Casualties and losses
Unknown	2,000 killed, wounded, or captured
- Location within France

War of the Sixth Coalition:
Campaign in north-east France
current battle
Napoleon in command
Napoleon not in command

The Battle of Lesmont was a battle of the War of the Sixth Coalition. It took place at Lesmont in Aube on 2 February 1814. A Coalition force of Russians and Bavarians under generals Eugen of Wurtemberg and Carl Philipp von Wrede was defeated by a French force under general Joseph Lagrange, which managed to destroy the town's bridge and prevent the Coalition force crossing the river Aube.

== Background ==
After the battle of La Rothière on 1 February 1814, Napoleon ordered a retreat towards Troyes and placed some of Michel Ney's troops as well as Joseph Lagrange's division from marshal Marmont's corps as his rearguard.

== Battle ==
The French army crossed the bridge at Lesmont on the night of 2 February protected by troops under Ney's command, who then retired. Lagrange's division remained in the village to cover the retreat and took up position on the right bank of the river behind the bridge. It was soon attacked by Eugen's cavalry and elements of von Wrede's corps.

Lagrange's division managed to hold its central position against several attacks, especially by Eugen's Russian cavalry. At the end of the battle the French troops set fire to the bridge and rejoined the main retreating force.

== Aftermath ==
The loss of the bridge meant that the Coalition cavalry lost contact with the French troops, which reached Troyes the following day without incident. There Napoleon gathered his army and re-took the offensive, beating the Russians at the battle of Champaubert on 10 February.
