= Louis Alix de Nompère de Champagny =

French politician and diplomat

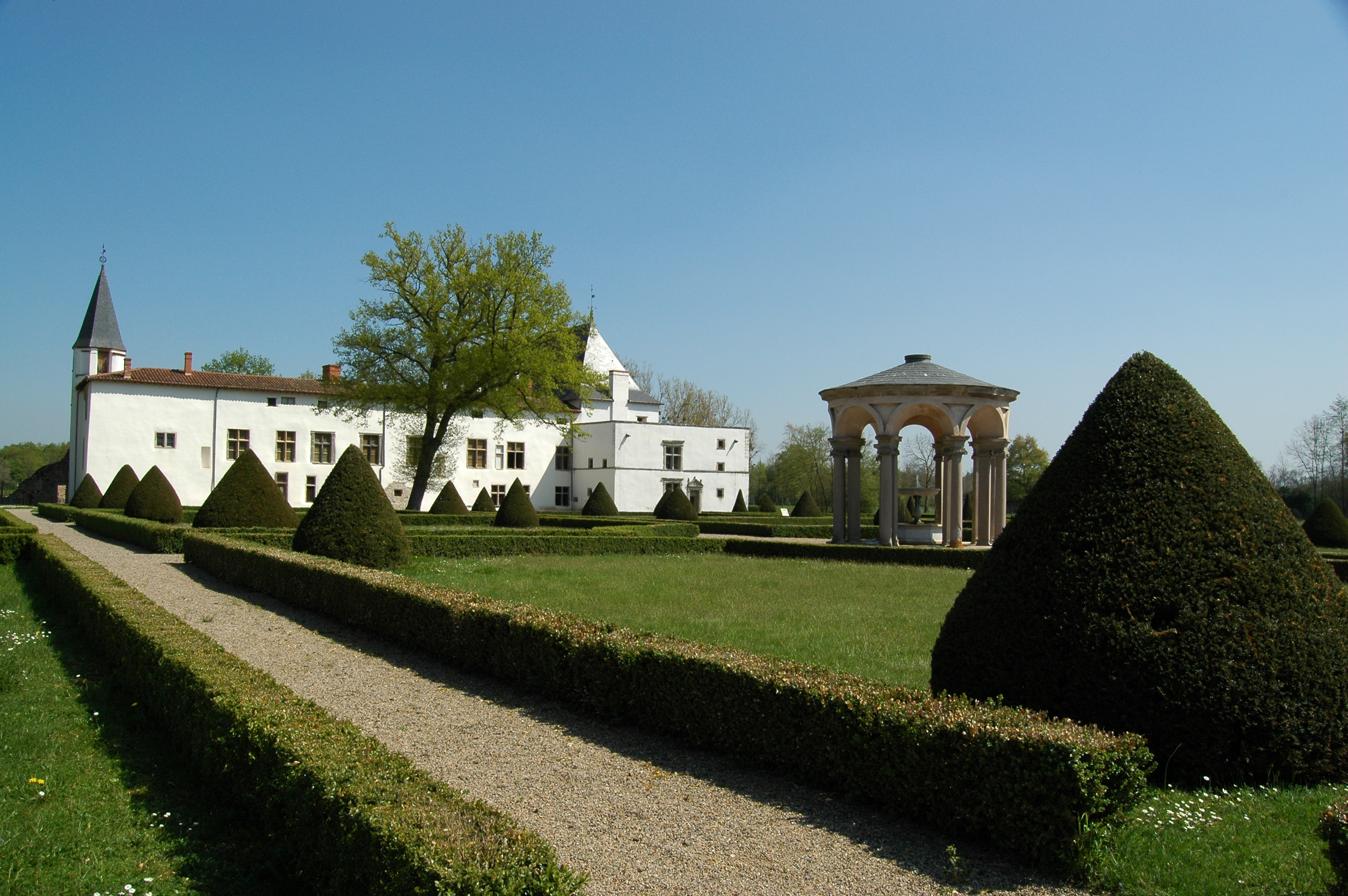
Gardens of the Château de la Bastie d'Urfé

Louis Alix de Nompère de Champagny (12 June 1796, Saint-Vincent-de-Boisset - 27 January 1870, Boulogne-sur-Seine) was a French politician and diplomat. He was the son of Jean-Baptiste de Nompère de Champagny. He retired into private life after the 1848 Revolution but returned in May 1861 as France's ambassador to Rome.

On 17 May 1824 in Paris, he married Caroline Élisabeth Lagrange (1806-1870), daughter of Joseph Lagrange (1763-1836) and Marie de Talhouët-Bonamour (1786-1849). She bought the Bastie d'Urfé.
