= Gramat =

- Commune
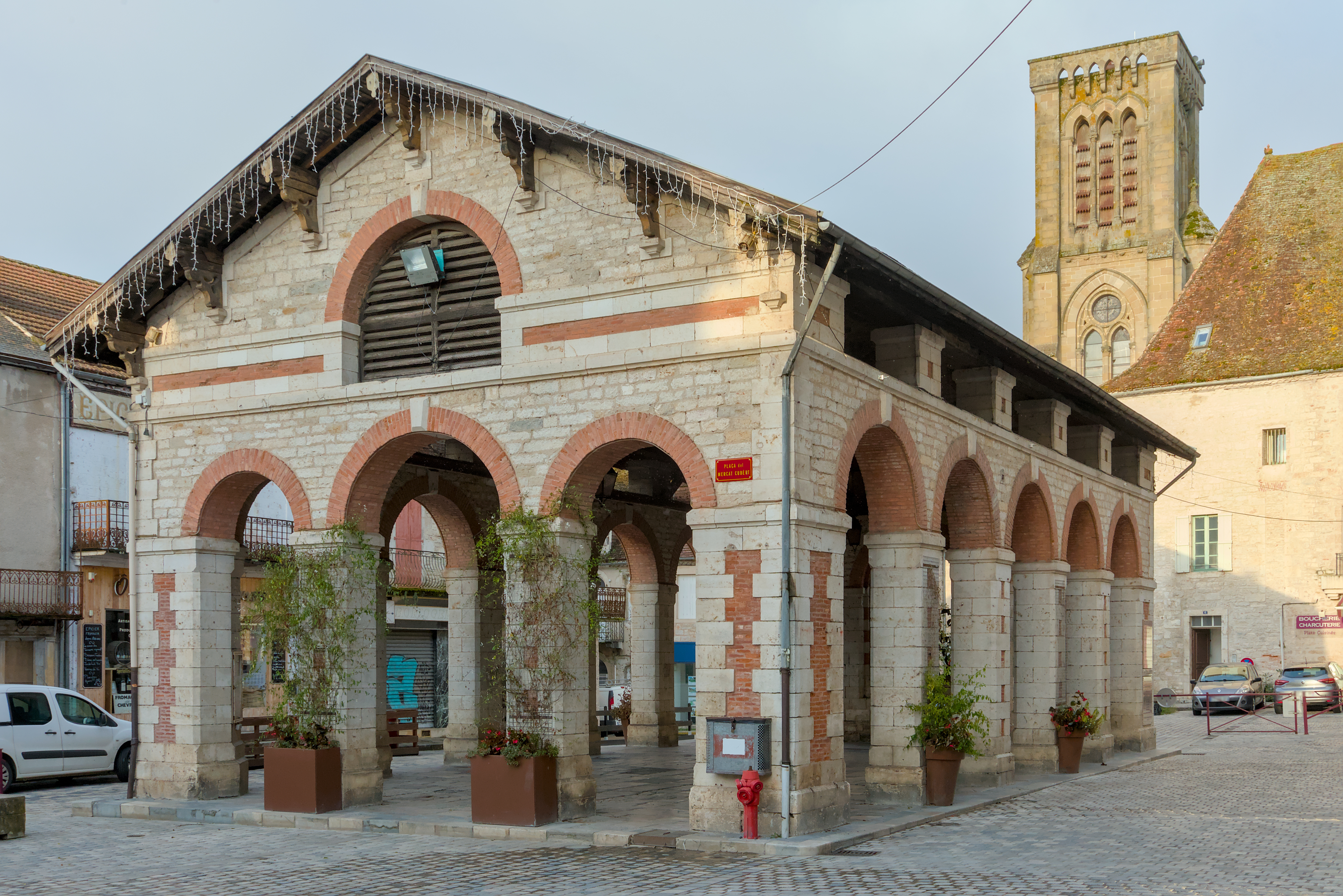
- Market square

- Coat of arms
- Location of Gramat
- Location within France Location within Occitanie
- Coordinates: 44°46′47″N 1°43′33″E
- Country: France
- Region: Occitania
- Department: Lot
- Arrondissement: Gourdon
- Canton: Gramat
- Intercommunality: Causses et Vallée de la Dordogne

Government
  - Mayor (2020–2026): Michel Sylvestre
- Area^{1}: 57.07 km^{2} (22.03 sq mi)
- Elevation: 310 m (1,020 ft)
- Highest elevation: 404 m (1,325 ft)
- Lowest elevation: 220 m (720 ft)
- Population (2023): 3,512
  - Density: 61.54/km^{2} (159.4/sq mi)
- Time zone: UTC+01:00 (CET)
  - Summer (DST): UTC+02:00 (CEST)
- INSEE/Postal code: 46128 /46500
- ^{1} French Land Register data, which excludes lakes, ponds, glaciers > 1 km^{2} (0.386 sq mi or 247 acres) and river estuaries.

Gramat (French pronunciation: [ɡʁama]) is a commune in the Lot department in south-western France. Gramat station has rail connections to Brive-la-Gaillarde, Figeac and Rodez.

== Population ==
Historical population
Year	Pop.	±% p.a.
1968	3,161	—
1975	3,288	+0.56%
1982	3,643	+1.48%
1990	3,526	−0.41%
1999	3,545	+0.06%
2007	3,530	−0.05%
2012	3,576	+0.26%
2017	3,528	−0.27%
2023	3,512	−0.08%
Source: INSEE

== Notable person ==
- Julien Bessières (1777–1840), scientist and diplomat, was born in Gramat

== See also ==
- Communes of the Lot department
