= Jean-Baptiste Bessières =

French Marshal (1768–1813)

Marshal Jean-Baptiste Bessières Duke of Istria
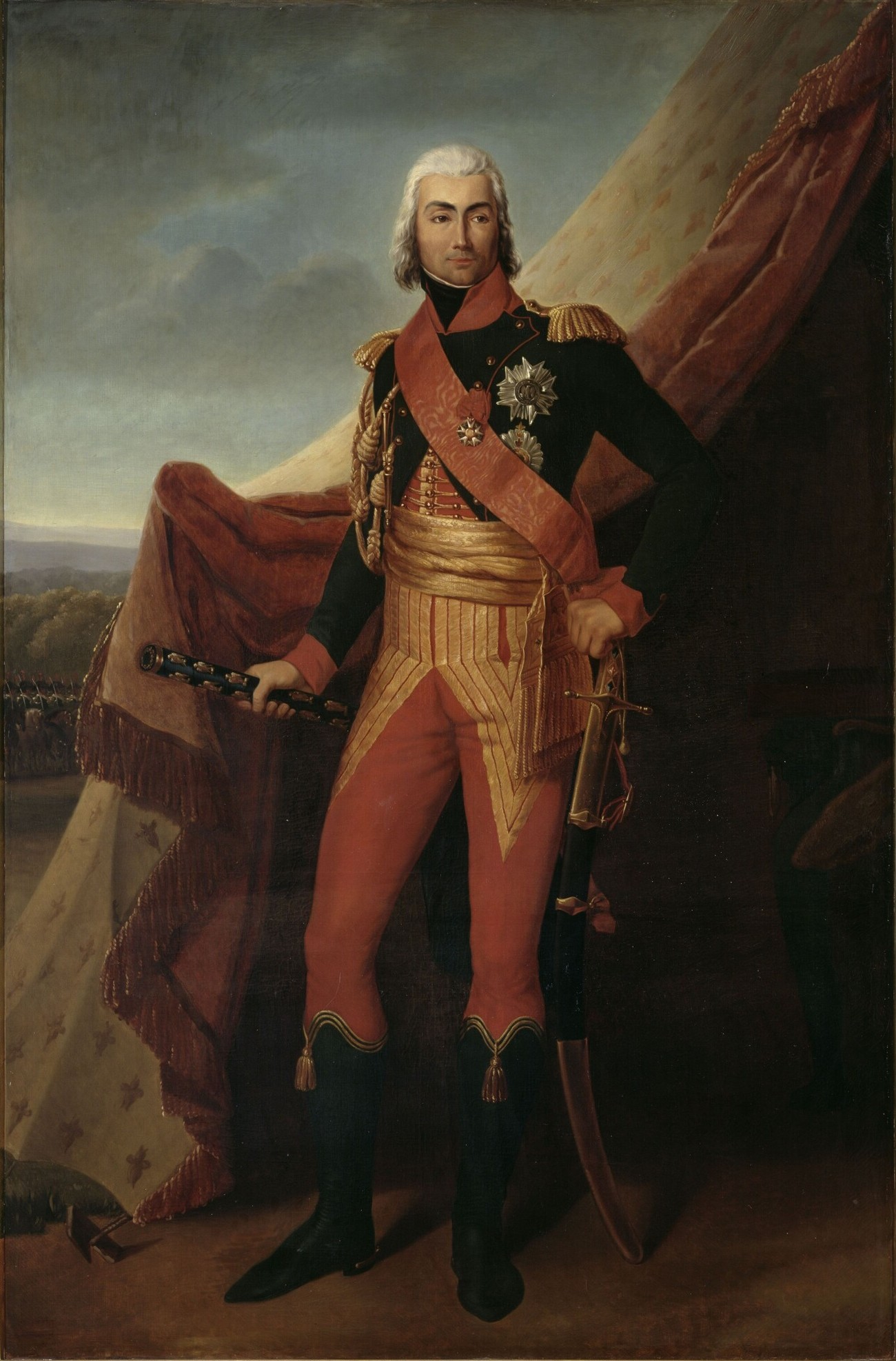
- Portrait by Henri-François Riesener
- Born: 6 August 1768; Prayssac, Kingdom of France
- Died: 1 May 1813 (aged 44); Weißenfels, Kingdom of Saxony
- Children: Napoléon Bessières
- Relatives: Bertrand Bessières (brother); Julien Bessières (cousin)
- Military career
- Allegiance: France
- Branch: Army
- Service years: 1792–1813
- Rank: General of division
- Conflicts: See battles: French Revolutionary Wars; War of the Pyrenees; Battle of Boulou; Battle of the Black Mountain; Battle of Bascara; Italian campaign of 1796–1797; Battle of Rovereto; Battle of Rivoli; Battle of Marengo; French campaign in Egypt and Syria; Siege of Acre; Battle of Abukir; Napoleonic Wars; War of the Third Coalition; Battle of Austerlitz; War of the Fourth Coalition; Battle of Jena–Auerstedt; Battle of Eylau; Battle of Friedland; Peninsular War; Battle of Medina de Rioseco; War of the Fifth Coalition; Battle of Aspern-Essling; Battle of Wagram; Walcheren Campaign; French invasion of Russia; Battle of Borodino; War of the Sixth Coalition; Battle of Lutzen (1813) †

Jean-Baptiste Bessières, duc d'Istrie (English: /ˈbɛsiɛər/ BESS-ee-air, French: [ʒɑ̃ batist bɛsjɛʁ]; 6 August 1768 – 1 May 1813) was a French military leader of the French Revolutionary Wars and the Napoleonic Wars. He was made a Marshal of the Empire by Emperor Napoleon in 1804.

Born into the petite bourgeoisie, Bessières began his military career during the French Revolution and was promoted to captain in the 22nd Chasseur à cheval Regiment. He was noticed during the Italian campaign of 1796–1797 by General Napoleon Bonaparte, who appointed him commander of the corps of mounted guides. In this capacity, Bessières participated in the Egyptian campaign until 1799, before being made a general under the Consulate for his distinguished service at the Battle of Marengo. He was elevated to the dignity of Marshal of the Empire in 1804 and took command of the cavalry of the Imperial Guard.

A brilliant cavalry officer, Bessières distinguished himself in most of the major battles of the Napoleonic Wars, notably at Austerlitz, Eylau, Aspern-Essling and Wagram. In 1808, he played an active role in the Peninsular War, scoring a victory at Medina de Rioseco early in the conflict, the consequences of which were nevertheless short-lived. His performance three years later at the Battle of Fuentes de Oñoro, where his support for Masséna was lacking, generated controversy. He nevertheless took part in the Russian campaign in 1812, during which he saved Napoleon from a Cossack attack, and was given command of the entire French cavalry at the start of the German campaign. Bessières was killed by a cannonball on 1 May 1813 at Rippach, near Weißenfels, the day before the Battle of Lützen.

Bessières was, according to Napoleon, "a reserve officer full of vigor, but prudent and circumspect." A mediocre commander-in-chief, he was, on the other hand, an excellent cavalry general, capable of initiative and who often personally led charges. The death of this cultivated, pious and popular man within the Guard was keenly felt by the Emperor, who declared of him: "he lived like Bayard, he died like Turenne."

== Early life and career ==
Jean-Baptiste Bessières was born on 6 August 1768 in Prayssac, in the province of Quercy. He was the eldest of eight children of Mathurin Bessières, a barber-surgeon belonging to the local bourgeoisie, and Antoinette Lemozy, who came from an old Guyennais bourgeois family. Educated in his childhood by a priest, Bessières later studied at the Collège Saint-Michel in Cahors, where he received a solid education. It was also there that he met Joachim Murat, with whom he became friends. In order to follow his father's profession, Bessières prepared to take courses at the medical school of Montpellier, but his family suddenly found itself in a difficult financial situation, and he had to learn by experience under the guidance of his father and one of his cousins. Thanks to his education, he participated in the drafting of his town's cahiers de doléances in 1788, and became second-in-command of the local National Guard when the French Revolution broke out.

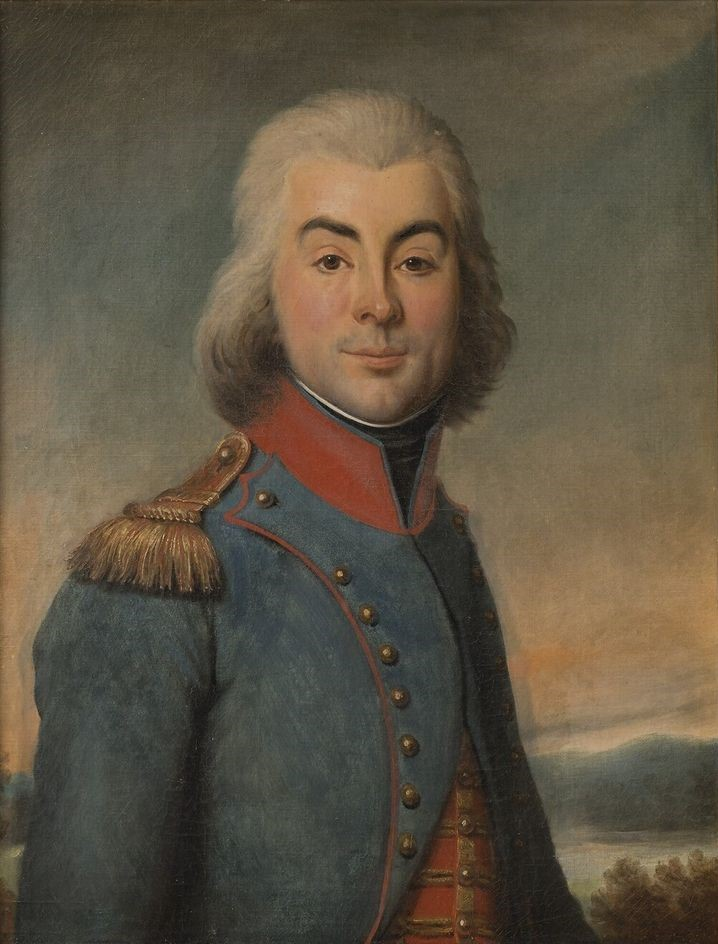
Jean-Baptiste Bessières, adjutant in 1792 by Jean-Baptiste Paulin Guérin, 1835

On 8 February 1792, Bessières was designated by his fellow citizens to serve in King Louis XVI's Constitutional Guard in Paris, which he joined on 7 April. Each department was required to supply it with a certain number of young men, who were selected from families considered as still being loyal to the king. Among others sent by the department of Lot for the Guard were Joachim Murat and Jean-Jacques Ambert. Despised for its royalist nature, the Constitutional Guard was disbanded by the revolutionary government on 29 May 1792, less than three months after its formation. After his discharge, Bessières joined the Jacobins Saint-Dominique battalion of the Parisian National Guard. Although he adhered to the ideas of the Revolution, Bessières disapproved of its radical turn which clashed with his Catholic convictions deeply tinged with conservatism. Remaining loyal to the king, he tried to take part in the defense of the Tuileries Palace during the Insurrection of 10 August and, as a precaution, had to hide for a time at the residence of the Duke of La Rochefoucauld.

== French Revolutionary Wars ==
Bessières gave a fresh start to his military career on 1 November 1792, when he enlisted in the French Revolutionary Army as a simple cavalryman in the Legion of the Pyrenees, which later became the 22nd Chasseur à cheval Regiment. The regiment was sent to the Army of the Eastern Pyrenees, and for the next three years Bessières fought in the War of the Pyrenees. His advancement was reasonably rapid; he was promoted to adjudant sous-officier on 1 December 1792, to second lieutenant on 16 February 1793, to lieutenant on 10 May, and finally to captain on 8 May 1794. Serving successively under generals La Barre and Dugua, he notably participated in the Battle of Boulou, where the charge of the 22nd Chasseurs was decisive in dispersing the more numerous Spanish cavalry. Next he took part in the Battle of the Black Mountain under the command of General Dugua, and distinguished himself at Bascara in 1795.

In August 1795, Bessières was transferred with his regiment to the Army of Italy. This army was soon placed under the command of General Napoleon Bonaparte, who had as one of his aides-de-camp none other than his friend Murat. Bessières distinguished himself at the start of the campaign by capturing on foot, and with the help of two of his chasseurs, an Austrian artillery piece after having his horse shot from under him. He quickly acquired a reputation for bravery, which earned him his appointment by Bonaparte as head of the corps of mounted guides of the Army of Italy. On 4 September 1796, at the Battle of Rovereto, he spotted an Austrian battery with six of his chasseurs and seized two of its cannons. The same day, he was provisionally promoted to the rank of chef d'escadron, which was confirmed on 4 March 1797. He then distinguished himself at the Battle of Rivoli on 14 January 1797, then at that of La Favorita two days later, and was given the honor of bringing to the Directory the enemy standards captured during the last engagements. He then returned to Italy and joined Bonaparte's inner circle. He was appointed chef de brigade on 9 March 1797.

As the commander of the guides of Bonaparte, now commander-in-chief of the Army of the Orient, in May 1798 Bessières departed for the expedition to Egypt. His men, almost entirely deprived of mounts, played no role in the first phase of the campaign. He followed Bonaparte to Syria and distinguished himself at the Siege of Acre and then, after the withdrawal of French forces to Egypt, at the Battle of Abukir (25 July 1799) where he joined Murat in leading a series of cavalry charges that helped drive their adversaries back into the sea. In the official report on the battle that he sent to the Directory on 27 July 1799, Bonaparte noted: "chef de brigade Bessières, at the head of the guides, upheld the reputation of his corps". Having helped Bonaparte to reassert his authority when it was being contested during the campaign, Bessières was part of the small retinue that accompanied the commander-in-chief on his return to France in August 1799.

== Under the Consulate ==
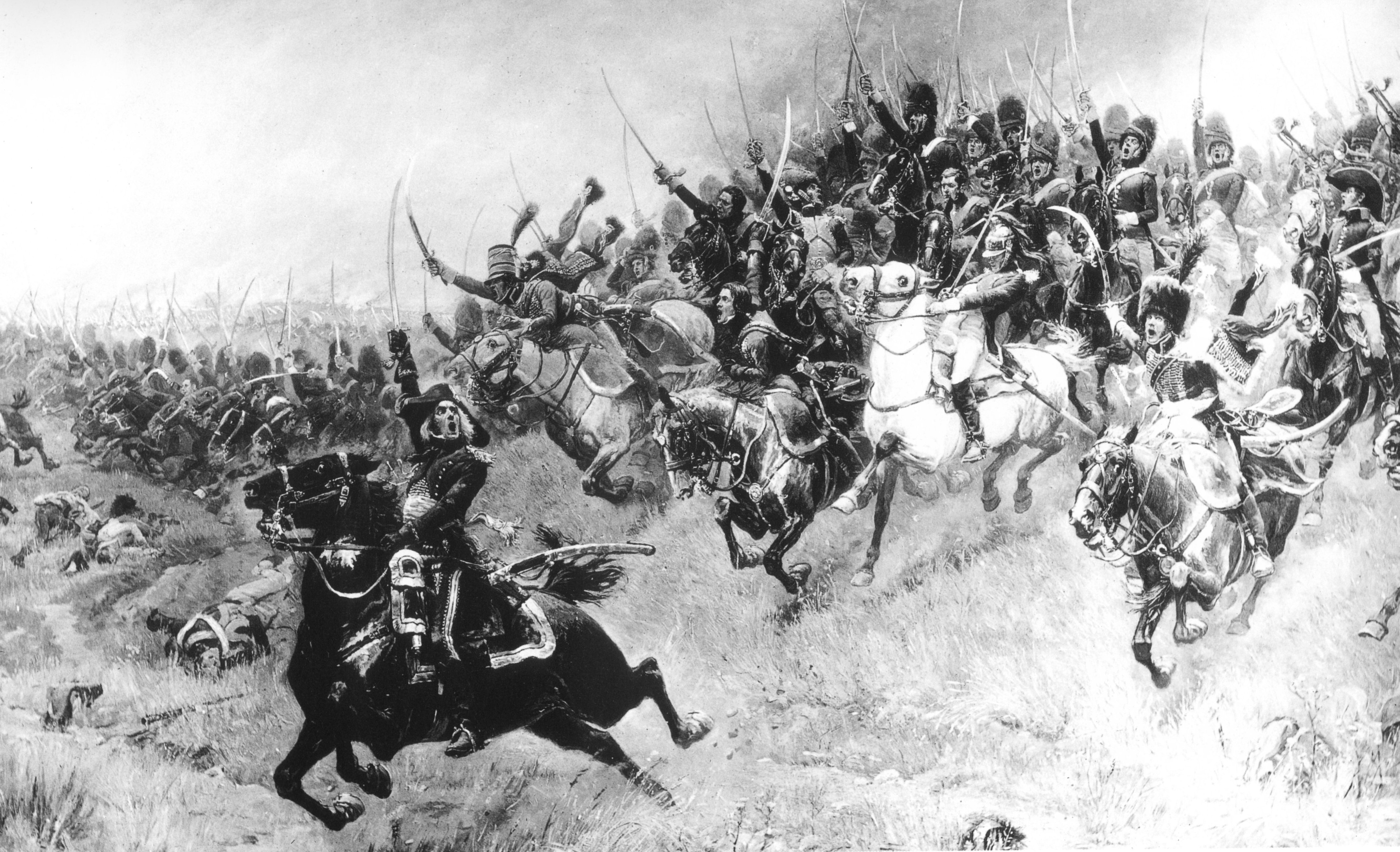
Bessières leading the cavalry of the Consular Guard in a charge at the Battle of Marengo, 14 June 1800. Painting by Alphonse Lalauze.

Back in France, Bessières was present at the coup d'état of 18 Brumaire during which, according to Jacques Garnier, he "stayed constantly with Bonaparte". On 11 November 1799, he was appointed second-in-command of the Consular Guard by Bonaparte, now First Consul of the French Republic. He was also designated tutor to Eugène de Beauharnais, Bonaparte's adoptive son.

On 14 June 1800, Bessières took part in the Battle of Marengo. When the tide turned against the First Consul, Desaix and the Boudet division arrived on the battlefield. To support their movement, the Kellermann brigade deployed on the right flank while Bessières mounted a massive charge on the left flank with the entire cavalry of the Consular Guard, sowing panic among the Austrians. The grenadiers à cheval, in particular, took possession of three enemy standards. Although successful, the charge's effect on the battle was not as decisive as Bonaparte pretended. After the fighting, Bessières was praised by the First Consul, who told him: "under your command, the Guard covered itself with glory, it could not have done better in the given circumstances." He was successively promoted to general of brigade on 18 July 1800 and to general of division on 13 September 1802.

== Marshal of the Empire ==
=== Early Empire and the charge at Austerlitz ===
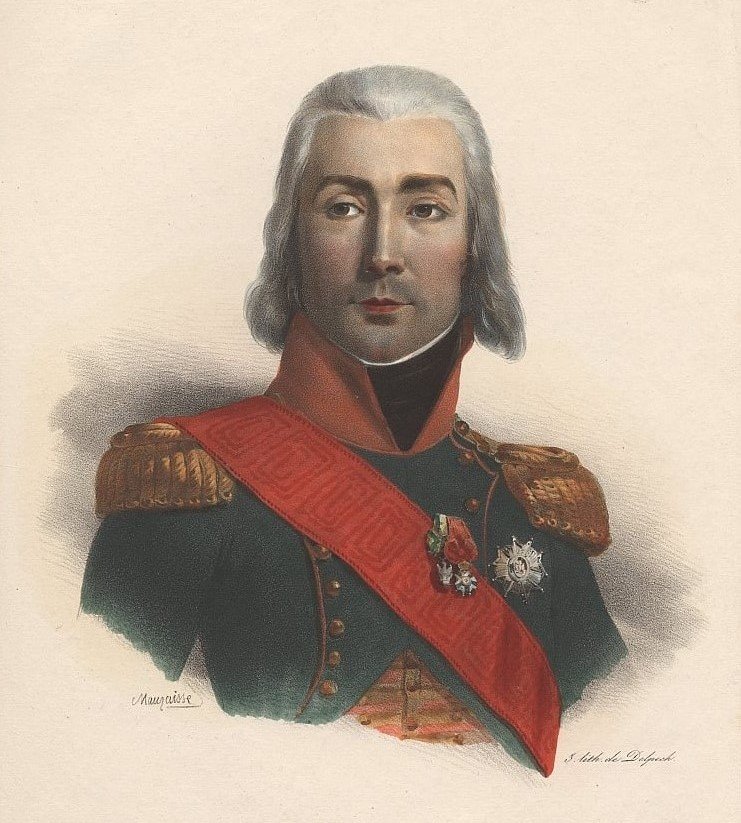
Portrait by Jean-Baptiste Mauzaisse

With the establishment of the imperial regime, Bessières was elevated to the dignity of Marshal of the Empire on 19 May 1804. On 14 June, he was made a Grand Officer of the Legion of Honour, then Colonel General of the cavalry of the Imperial Guard on 20 July. This latter function allowed Bessières to exercise considerable influence within the Imperial Guard, which he set about reforming and disciplining. Leading the Guard cavalry during parades and on the battlefields, his important military functions led him to be among the Emperor's intimates, whom he very often accompanied on his travels. However, this prestigious appointment aroused the jealousy of other marshals, and Bessières' accession to the marshalate appeared to be an unjustified favour in view of his service record, which was less brilliant than that of many others. General Auguste de Marmont, a future marshal, said that if Bessières could be made a marshal, then anyone could become one as well. In fact, despite his undeniable bravery, Bessières owed his marshal's baton more to his loyalty to Napoleon than to his talents on the battlefield. On 2 February 1805, he received the insignia of the Grand Eagle of the Legion of Honour.

Bessières took part in the German campaign of the War of the Third Coalition in command of all the units of the Imperial Guard. While the chasseurs à cheval of the Guard were sent as an advance guard, the marshal escorted Napoleon with the grenadiers à cheval and the Mamelukes. On 20 November, when Murat's cavalry had just been overwhelmed on the road to Olmütz by its Russian counterpart, Bessières restored the situation by counterattacking with four squadrons of the Imperial Guard, jointly with General d'Hautpoul's cuirassiers, and push his adversaries back to Raußnitz. A few days later, on 2 December, at the Battle of Austerlitz, Bessières led the charge of the chasseurs à cheval and grenadiers à cheval of the Guard, which routed the Russian Imperial Guard. While Napoleon planned to break the Austro-Russian center in order to divide the enemy forces and the situation was rather to his advantage, a potentially dangerous event for the French occurred when the Russian Imperial Guard, under the command of Grand Duke Konstantin, attacked the soldiers of the Vandamme division around Stary Vinohrady with the support of their artillery. The French 4th Line Regiment and 24th Light Infantry Regiment suffered heavy losses (over 400 men), with the 4th Line losing its eagle.

Napoleon then decided to send Bessières and the Guard cavalry, composed of the chasseurs à cheval and the Mamelukes (four squadrons), the grenadiers à cheval (four squadrons), as well as two batteries of horse artillery of the Guard to support them. An initial charge executed by two squadrons of horse chasseurs à cheval, supported by three squadrons of grenadiers à cheval, dispersed the Tsar's cavalry and allowed the infantry of the Russian Guard to be engaged. However, the arrival of seven squadrons of Cossacks and Chevalier Guards as reinforcements reversed the situation. To support the cavalry, the Emperor first sent the remainder of the chasseurs à cheval and the Mamelukes, followed by the last squadron of grenadiers à cheval. The Russian cavalry was driven back and suffered heavy losses, with the Chevalier Guards losing more than 200 men, including Prince Repnin-Volkonsky. The total casualties of the Guard cavalry amounted to around 140 men. The charges of the Guard cavalry led by Bessières allowed this final Russian attack on the Pratzen heights to be repelled, leaving the French in control of the plateau until the end of the battle. Returning to Vienna with the Emperor and the Guard, Bessières returned to France after the signing of the Treaty of Pressburg in late December.

=== Prussian and Polish campaigns ===
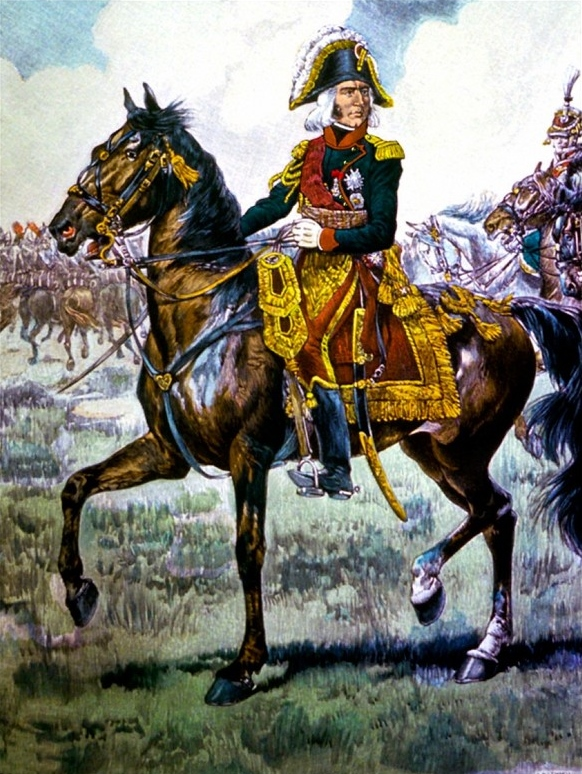
Jean-Baptiste Bessières, Marshal of the Empire and Colonel General of the cavalry of the Imperial Guard. Illustration by Job.

On 14 October 1806, Bessières was present the Battle of Jena without taking an active part. Shortly afterwards he took part in the triumphant entry of the French Army into Berlin, where he paraded at the head of the Imperial Guard cavalry, and was entrusted with several administrative and organizational tasks. He spent the rest of the Prussian campaign attached to the Emperor's headquarters. Operations continued against the Russians, and around mid-December, Bessières obtained command of the II Cavalry Corps, comprising two dragoon divisions, one cuirassier division and three light cavalry regiments, totalling 7,500 cavalrymen.

Crossing the Vistula on 17 December, Bessières' cavalry advanced with caution into Polish territory and pushed the enemy back beyond the Wkra. Attacked on 23 December at Bieżuń when he had only two companies of light infantry to support his cavalry, Bessières managed to withstand the attacks of several Prussian and Russian columns of around 5,000 to 6,000 men. He then gained the upper hand, took two standards, five cannons and a number of prisoners of war. The next day, Bessières charged several Prussian squadrons and seized multiple artillery pieces. Remaining with Bernadotte's I Corps on the banks of the Wkra, Bessières, poorly informed by Tilly's light cavalry, lingered for three days at Bieżuń while the French army had launched its offensive against the Russians. He finally resumed his advance on 27 December towards Mława, but the campaign was interrupted shortly afterwards when Napoleon put his troops into winter quarters. Bessières' corps was dissolved on 12 January and he returned with the Emperor to Warsaw, where he retook command of the Imperial Guard.

On 8 February 1807, at the Battle of Eylau, Augereau's corps had its advance derailed by a snowstorm and was crushed by Russian artillery fire. Bennigsen's cavalry attempted to exploit this success, but was repelled thanks to a charge by the Guard's chasseurs à cheval led by Bessières. Napoleon then ordered Marshal Murat to launch all the reserve cavalry in a massive charge. The French cavalry broke through the first Russian line, then the second, before finding themselves behind the enemy ranks, threatened with encirclement. As a result, the Emperor ordered Bessières to assist the reserve cavalry with that of the Guard. A second charge was executed by the chasseurs à cheval of the Guard followed by 5th Cuirassiers and the grenadiers à cheval, who broke through the enemy lines but, lost in a snowstorm, narrowly escaped being captured. The charge of the Guard cavalry finally allowed the reserve cavalry to avoid encirclement and return to its initial positions.

Following the French tactical victory at Eylau, Bessières remained by Napoleon's side and focused on reinforcing his troops, which had been worn down by the last campaign. In May, the Imperial Guard counted approximately 8,500 men. With the resumption of hostilities, Bessières served at the Battle of Heilsberg on 10 June, where his chief of staff, General Roussel, was killed by a cannonball, and at the Battle of Friedland on the 14th, which resulted in a decisive victory for Napoleon. Bessières was present alongside Napoleon at the meeting of 25 June 1807 with Tsar Alexander I of Russia on the Niemen, where a draft of the Treaty of Tilsit was drawn up. He left Tilsit on 9 July with the Emperor and the Guard and began the return march to Berlin and then Paris. Bessières was then tasked with negotiating the marriage of Princess Catharina of Württemberg to the Emperor's brother Jérôme Bonaparte, King of Westphalia. Once this mission was accomplished, Bessières returned to Paris, where he attended from 25 to 28 November the festivities organized for the return of the Imperial Guard.

=== First campaign in the Iberian Peninsula ===
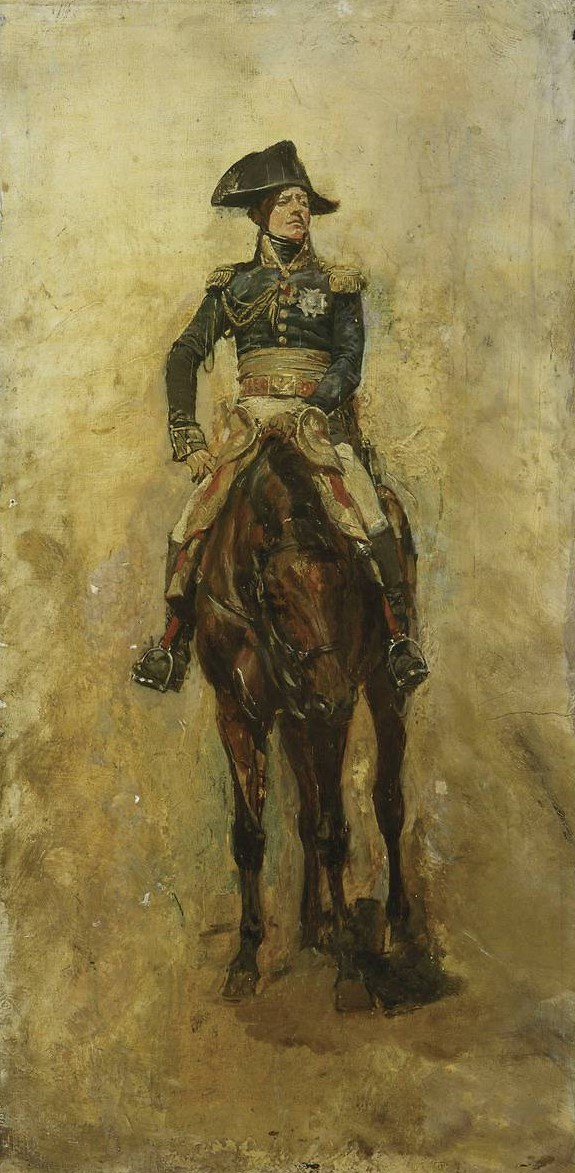
Marshal Bessières on horseback by Ernest Meissonier, c. 1864

Following the Dos de Mayo Uprising in Madrid on 2 May 1808, Napoleon sent Bessières to Spain to reinforce the French occupation troops. The marshal, exercising independent command for the first time, took command of the units of the Imperial Guard and the Observation Corps of the Western Pyrenees, with which he established himself in Burgos while awaiting the arrival of Joseph Bonaparte, who had been designated by his brother to take the throne of Spain. The troops placed under Bessières' orders mainly comprised conscript units, formed into provisional regiments of little value, with only four battalions of experienced troops. Occupying from May the provinces of Navarre and Gipuzkoa, Bessières seized the cities of Logroño and Torquemada on 6 June, then Segovia on 7 June.

In July, the Spanish Army of Galicia commanded by Generals Blake and Cuesta marched against the French. Bessières went to meet this army with all available troops, or about 15,600 men, and faced it at the Battle of Medina de Rioseco on 14 July. Judging it preferable to attack his adversaries separately in order to defeat them in detail, Bessières ordered General Merle, supported by Lasalle, to attack Blake's army while General Mouton's division was tasked with distracting Cuesta. An initial assault on Mount Moclín by the Sabatier brigade failed, and it was only on the second attempt that the French managed to take control of the position. Bessières then had the Valdecuevas plateau bombarded and then assaulted by the Sabatier, Darmagnac and Ducos brigades. Blake repelled the first attack, but at that moment made the mistake of detaching one of his divisions to Cuesta, dangerously weakening his left wing. Lasalle's light cavalry charged this weak sector of the Spanish line, dispersed the enemy infantry and, in a few minutes, swept into the Valdecuevas heights.

Bessières now turned his attention to Cuesta. Portago's Spanish division launched a counterattack on the plateau and initially met some success, but was finally repelled by the French infantry's own counterattack. Cuesta's troops were no more fortunate against Mouton; battered by musket fire and a charge by the imperial cavalry, they joined the general debacle despite the resilience of a few rearguard units. The battle ended around 3 p.m. with a clear French victory, Bessières' first as commander-in-chief of an independent force. French losses were around 1,000 men compared to nearly 8,000 killed, wounded, captured or missing among the Spanish. The timid French pursuit was halted by the presence of the guerrillas, but the victory at Medina de Rioseco eradicated the regular Spanish army from the northern provinces and opened the way to Madrid for King Joseph. Napoleon, receiving the news, exclaimed: "This is a second battle of Villaviciosa; Bessières has placed my brother Joseph on the throne of Spain".

Bessières followed up his success by pushing towards Mayorga, which he entered on 22 July. He wrote to Blake to urge him to lay down his arms, arguing that his cause was futile, and ordered the release of several hundred prisoners taken at Medina de Rioseco as a gesture of goodwill. The strategic advantages gained over the Spanish as a result of this battle were, however, overshadowed by General Dupont's defeat at Bailén, which forced the French to recross the Ebro. Bessières' corps withdrew towards Briviesca while awaiting the arrival of the Emperor, who had decided to intervene personally in Spain. Once he arrived, Bessières received the order to advance on Burgos but lost time, either because he overestimated the enemy forces or because he had known since 6 November that he was to be replaced by Marshal Soult at the head of the II Corps. On 9 November, he handed over his command to the latter, while retaining that of the Imperial Guard and the reserve cavalry. In accordance with the Emperor's orders, the two marshals marched on Burgos and clashed with the Spanish army of the Count of Belveder in front of the city, at the Battle of Gamonal. The decisive action of the French infantry against the Spanish lines was completed by a heavy cavalry attack led by Bessières, which cut down fleeing soldiers and seized numerous artillery pieces.

Bessières directed the French pursuit and fought at the Battle of Somosierra on 30 November alongside the Emperor, where the Polish light cavalrymen of the Guard seized a defile guarded by a Spanish army and sixteen artillery pieces. The defenders were pushed back to Madrid, to which Bessières, arriving on 2 December with the Guard cavalry and the La Houssaye and Latour-Maubourg dragoon divisions, sent an initial order for surrender. His offer was rejected, but the Spanish capital was finally forced to capitulate on 4 December to the Emperor himself. Bessières then contributed to the destruction of General Castaños' forces, which he harassed along the way until the Andalusian border. On that date, he was recalled to Madrid by Napoleon to join the pursuit of General John Moore's British army, which was retreating in northern Spain. He led the cavalry to Villafranca del Bierzo before returning to Valladolid with Napoleon, who had decided to return to France to prepare for an imminent war with Austria. Bessières was appointed governor of Spain's northern provinces on 17 January 1809 and returned to France on 9 March.

=== Essling and Wagram ===
Recalled by the Emperor for the War of the Fifth Coalition, Bessières was entrusted from 10 April with the cavalry reserve of the Army of Germany. This consisted of the Lasalle and Montbrun light cavalry divisions, the Beaumont dragoon division and the Nansouty heavy cavalry division, for a total of around 15,000 cavalrymen. On 21 April, marching in the vanguard with the Bavarian cavalry and the Nansouty and Saint-Sulpice divisions, Bessières defeat the Austrian cavalry in front of Landshut. On the night of the 22nd, Napoleon ordered him to pursue Hiller's Austrian corps, defeated the previous day at Landshut. The Marshal's forces for this mission were composed of the Bavarian Wrede division of the VII Corps, the Molitor infantry division and the Marulaz cavalry division, both belonging to the IV Corps. Bessières arrived at Neumarkt-Sankt Veit on 22 April, accompanied by the Wrede division and Marulaz's cavalry, which was sent in a reconnaissance on the banks of the Inn. A first contact between the two armies took place on 23 April: the next day, Hiller launched a counterattack and quickly put the Franco-Bavarian troops in a difficult situation, despite the resistance of the Wrede division on the hills southeast of Neumarkt. Threatened with encirclement, Bessières ordered a retreat early in the afternoon. This defeat cost him 2,600 men killed, wounded or captured, compared to only 800 Austrians casualties.

Bessières then fought at the Battle of Aspern-Essling, which took place from 21 to 22 May. His 7,000 cavalrymen, linking the troops of Masséna and Lannes, were deployed on the plain between Aspern and Essling. These villages were the scene of bloody clashes which included repeated charges of Bessières' cavalrymen. A controversy then arose between him and Lannes, under whose orders he had been placed, who accused him of not committing himself sufficiently against the Austrians; at the time, Bessières ignored this but a lively argument between the two men ensued that same evening at the bivouac. On the second day, the French, despite their resistance, were overwhelmed by superior numbers and Napoleon had to order a retreat towards the island of Lobau. In the mean time, tasked with containing the Austrian pressure with his cavalry, Bessières kept Archduke Charles' troops at a distance and allowed the army to retire in good order. He was made duc d'Istrie (Duke of Istria) on 28 May 1809. ´This was a duché grand-fief, a rare, nominal, but hereditary honor (extinct in 1856) in Napoleon's own Kingdom of Italy.

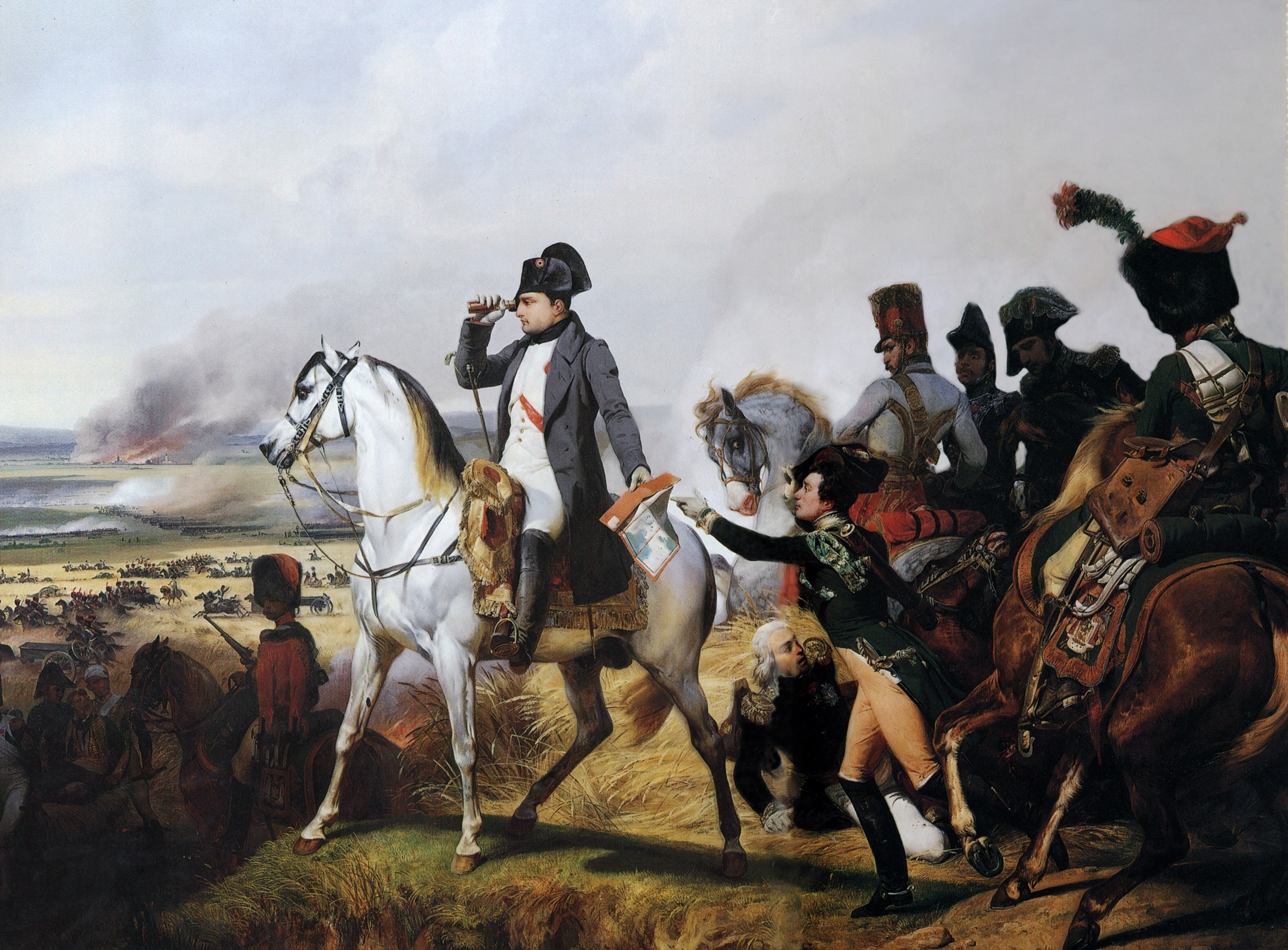
Battle of Wagram, 6 June 1809 by Horace Vernet, 1836. Behind Napoleon, Bessières is thrown to the ground by the death of his horse.

At the Battle of Wagram on 6 July, with the situation on the French left rapidly deteriorating, Napoleon ordered Marshal Bessières to charge the Austrian formations threatening his left wing. With time against him, Bessières chose not to wait for the arrival of the Guard cavalry and, with his two other heavy cavalry divisions engaged elsewhere, he decided to conduct his attack with the Nansouty division alone. The charge was carried out under a hail of cannonballs and grapeshot. Having located a weak point in the Austrian line, the French cavalrymen pierced and pushed back the enemy infantry that had formed into squares, cutting down a battalion of Grenzers in the process. However, a large part of the French cavalry was hampered by the masses of Austrian infantry and the attack lost much of its momentum. Bessières and Nansouty then turned to the right and charged the artillery of the Prince of Liechtenstein, but the Austrian cavalry intervened almost immediately and pushed the French cavalrymen back to their lines.

Bessières, whose determination had not been weakened by this first failure, was preparing to launch a new assault, this time with the support of part of the Guard cavalry, when he was knocked unconscious after his horse was struck dead by cannonball. The Imperial Guard, which adored him and believed him dead, was distressed. Napoleon later told him: "That was a fine shot, Bessières, it made my Guard cry." Without news of his commander, Nansouty decided to break off the engagement in order to preserve his already heavily battered division. Bessières' charge, although carried out in haste with a single division, had the important tactical consequence of giving Napoleon valuable time, allowing him to regain the initiative in the battle. After having filled the gap created by the advance of the Macdonald column, in the evening Bessières' cavalry launched itself against the retreating Austrian lines, but did not inflict any serious damage. Bessières was treated in Vienna and returned to France once his healing was complete.

=== Peacetime and return to Spain ===
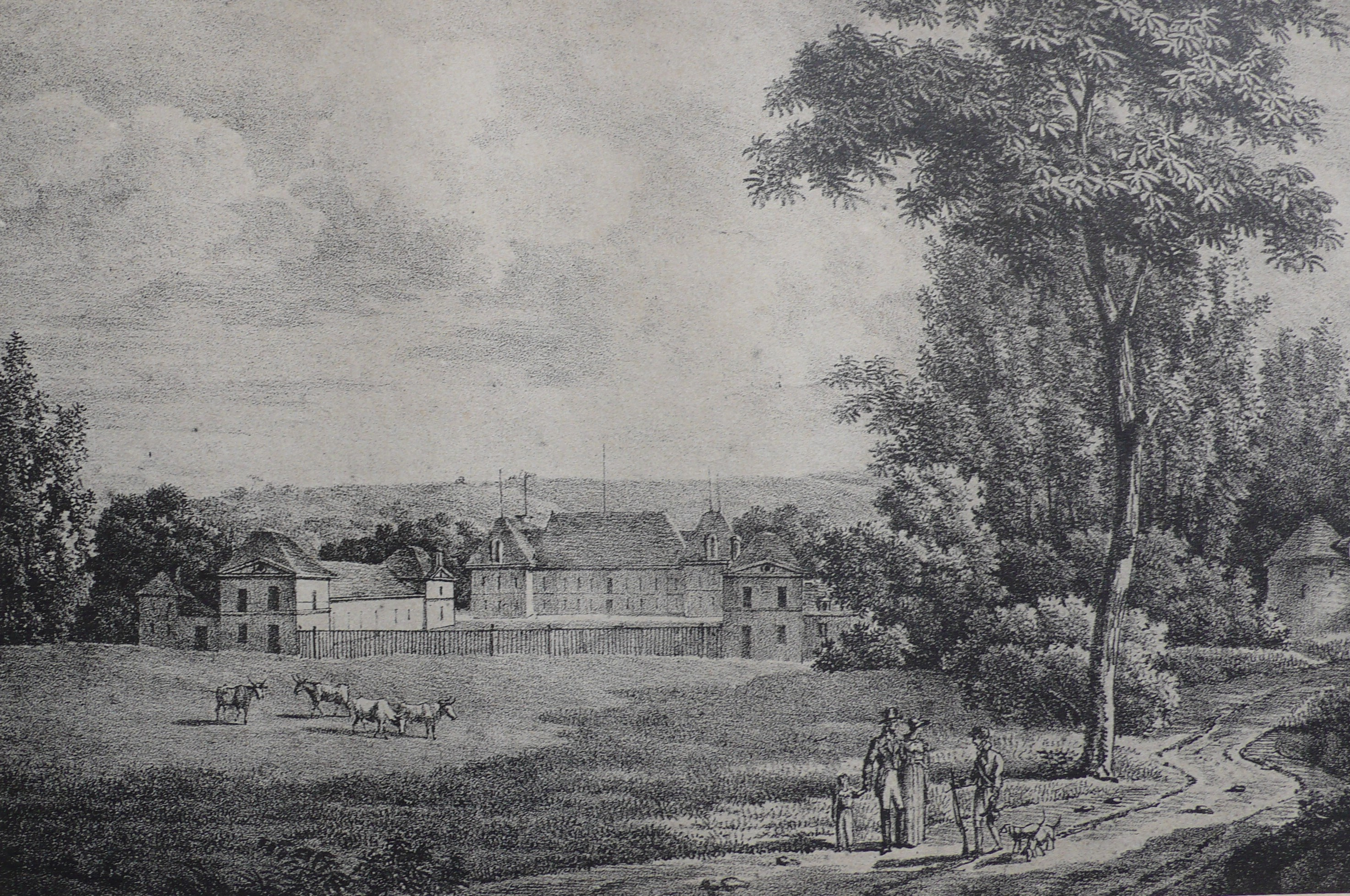
Bessières acquired the Château de Grignon (seen here c. 1808) in 1803

Shortly afterwards, on 8 August 1809, Bessières was appointed commander of the 16th military division, then of the three divisions of National Guards assembled at Ostende (then part of the department of Lys), Saint-Omer and Lille on 20 August. Around the same time, a British expeditionary force landed on the island of Walcheren and seized the town of Vlissingen, threatening Antwerp. A French army under Bernadotte's command was assembled to face the British, but the latter, plagued by fever, were repatriated at the end of August, with the exception of a garrison that remained in Vlissingen. On 11 September, Bessières replaced Bernadotte at the head of the Army of the North and reoccupied Vlissingen and Walcheren, which had been definitively evacuated by the British.

Back in Paris, Bessières coldly received Napoleon's divorce from Joséphine, which he had opposed in the past, but this did not prevent the Emperor from spending a few days at the Marshal's estate, the Château de Grignon. Bessières was named commander of the Imperial Guard in Paris on 19 January 1810; two months later, on 19 March, he was made governor of Strasbourg and in this capacity welcomed the new empress Marie Louise of Austria when she arrived on French soil. After attending the religious wedding of the imperial couple on 2 April, Bessières divided his time between Grignon and Paris and essentially occupied himself with the administration of the Guard.

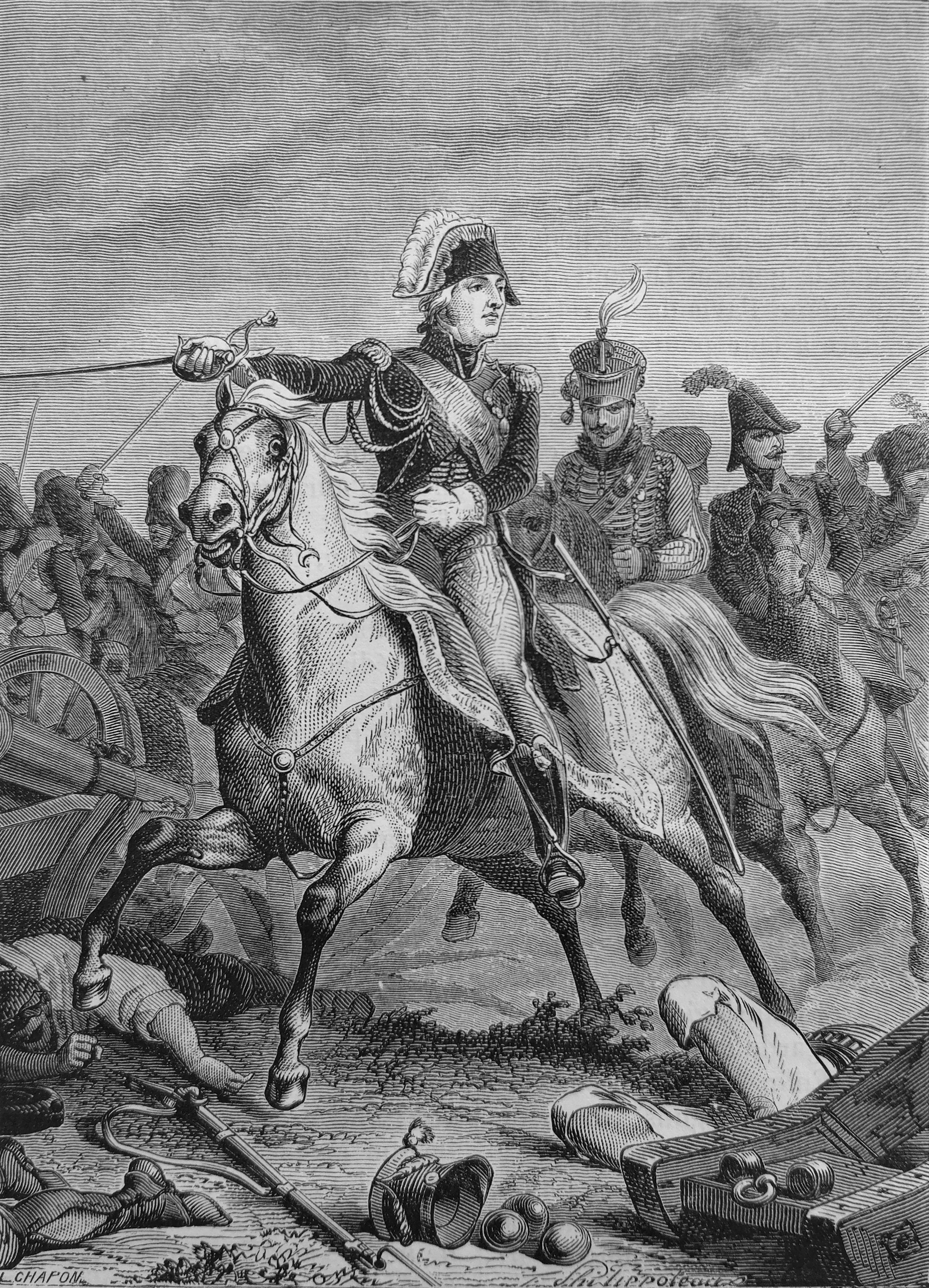
Marshal Bessières leading a cavalry charge. Illustration by Henri Félix Emmanuel Philippoteaux.

On 15 January 1811, Bessières was made commander-in-chief of the Army of the North of Spain. With around 66,000 men, it operated over a very large territory stretching from Navarre to Asturias, which led to a large dispersion of troops and significant logistical issues. Bessières' mission was to support the Army of Portugal led by Marshal Masséna. The latter, after failing to expel the Anglo-Portuguese troops of General Wellington from the peninsula, retreated to the Spanish border and requested Bessières' assistance, particularly in order to be supplied with horses and food. He also sought to regroup his forces in order to lift the Anglo-Portuguese blockade of Almeida. As the requests from the commander-in-chief of the Army of Portugal became increasingly urgent, Bessières highlighted his own difficulties, showed little inclination to cooperate and expressed his doubts about the strategy adopted by Prince of Essling. He also wrote to Major-General Berthier to inform him of the worrying material situation in which the Army of Portugal found itself. As a result, Masséna was forced to postpone his offensive twice before Bessières, realizing the need for immediate intervention to save Almeida and Ciudad Rodrigo, decided to send as reinforcements the Wathier and Lepic cavalry brigades (1,500 men) with six cannons and thirty carts. These troops, personally led by the Duke of Istria, joined Masséna on 1 May 1811.

A battle began on 3 May at Fuentes de Oñoro, in the province of Salamanca, that lasted three days. On the 5th, Wellington found himself in a delicate position in face of the French. Despite the meager reinforcements sent by Bessières, Masséna did indeed succeed in exploiting a weakness in Wellington's line, and the latter was on the verge of defeat. Masséna ordered his aide-de-camp, Charles Oudinot, to find Lepic and the Guard cavalry, with the order to charge immediately. However, Oudinot soon returned with bad news, reporting that Lepic only recognized Bessières as his commander and would not charge without his order. With Bessières nowhere to be found, the opportunity to finish off Wellington's army was lost. Later that day, Bessières opposed the use of his carts which Masséna wanted to direct to Ciudad Rodrigo in order to resupply the army with munitions. Ultimately, the battle ended in a major French strategic failure. Informed of the events, Napoleon told Bessières, through Berthier: "you have been useless to the Army of Portugal."

Following this defeat, Masséna was recalled to France and was replaced at the head of the Army of Portugal by Marshal Marmont, to whom Bessières had wheat, horses and supplies sent. Although he had initially opposed the movement conceived by Marmont to help Soult in Extremadura, by refusing to lead troops to Salamanca, he ended up giving his agreement and sending the requested troops. Bessières was replaced in his command in Spain on 8 July 1811 by General Dorsenne. Without assignment, he remained in Paris for a whole year and also took the opportunity to visit his father in his native Prayssac.

=== Russian campaign ===
Coat of arms of Jean-Baptiste Bessières as Duke of Istria (duc d'Istrie)

Bessières rejoined the Grande Armée in preparation for the Russian campaign in 1812 and once again took command of the cavalry of the Imperial Guard. At the time, this 6,000 men-strong elite formation consisted of General Walther's grenadiers à cheval, General Lefebvre-Desnouettes' horse and Mameluke chasseurs, two regiments of lancers under Generals Krasiński and Colbert, a regiment of dragoons and two squadrons of elite gendarmes. This appointment netherless seemed to be a disavowal, since Bessières was deprived of command of an army corps. Between February and March, the Guard units headed for Germany, then from mid-April, towards Poland. On 23 June, French troops reached the banks of the Niemen which was crossed the next day, marking the beginning of the invasion.

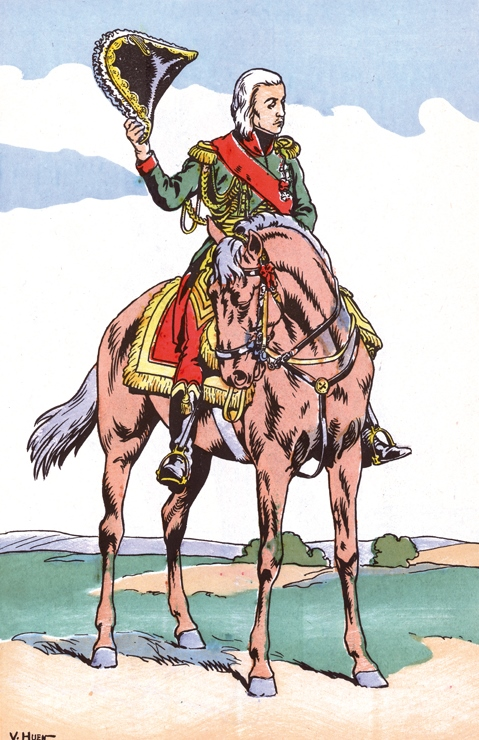
Illustration of Bessières by Victor Huen

Bessières followed the Emperor with the Guard during the first part of the campaign, entering Vilnius with him on 28 June and then Vitebsk on 28 July. The operations were challenging and the Grande Armée was greatly weakened by disease and desertion; however, the Guard cavalry was still little affected thanks to the good dispositions made by Bessières. After crossing the Dnieper and capturing Smolensk in mid-August, Napoleon hesitated to continue his march towards Moscow. Bessières was among those who encouraged him not to go further, but the Emperor finally decided to resume the offensive. The Russians, who until then had withdrawn almost without a fight before the French, accepted the confrontation at the Battle of the Moskowa, on 7 September 1812. Throughout the day, Bessières' cavalry was held in reserve along with the rest of the Imperial Guard. The French attacks had been continuing since the morning and managed, at the cost of enormous losses, to disrupt the center of the Russian position. At this moment, Murat and Ney expressly asked the Emperor to deploy the Imperial Guard, who refused to do so despite Bessières' favorable opinion. With the situation in the center having evolved, the two marshals renewed their request which was once again rejected by Napoleon, this time supported in this sense by the Duke of Istria. In the evening, the latter proposed in vain to his sovereign to deploy the Guard against the retreating Russian army.

The French entered Moscow on 15 September and Bessières set up camp with his troops near the Kremlin, where the Emperor resided. During the burning of Moscow, he managed to convince Napoleon to leave the palace. A few days later, the marshal was sent to the vanguard in support of Murat with an army corps comprising, in addition to the two lancer regiments of the Guard, light cavalry, dragoons, the Friederichs division from the I Corps and Poniatowski's Polish infantry. Crossing the Desna, he forced the Russian general Miloradovich to retreat and camped with Murat in front of Kutuzov's army at Tarutino, where the lack of fodder and supplies was sorely felt, particularly among the cavalry units. On 18 October, the two marshals were attacked by the Russians at the Battle of Vinkovo and had to retreat to Voronovo. They rejoined Napoleon shortly after when the retreat from Russia had just begun. On 25 October, the day after the Battle of Maloyaroslavets, the Emperor's staff was attacked by Cossacks at Gorodnia. Bessières, with the Guard cavalrymen that were standing nearby, restored the situation and repelled the assailants to the Luga. In the words of a biographer: "Bessières had saved the Emperor: the Bulletin of the Grande Armée made this known to all of Europe." At the war council that followed this event, the Duke of Istria advised retreating towards Smolensk via Mozhaysk; Napoleon ended up choosing the shortest route, which already been taken during the advance into Russia.

During the retreat, Bessières marched at the head of the army with the Imperial Guard, crossing successively Mozhaysk on 29 October, Viazma on 1 November, Dorogobuzh on the 5th and Smolensk on the 9th. At the Battle of Krasnoi on 15 November, the Guard attempted to contain the Russian assaults to allow the rest of the army to continue its retreat. When he reached Orsha on the 19 November, Bessières had no more than some 1,000 Guard cavalrymen under his command, half of whom were dismounted. After the crossing of the Berezina, the retreat of the French troops continued until Königsberg and, at the end of December, Bessières was recalled to France to oversee the reconstitution of the Guard and the cavalry reserve.

=== Death in combat ===
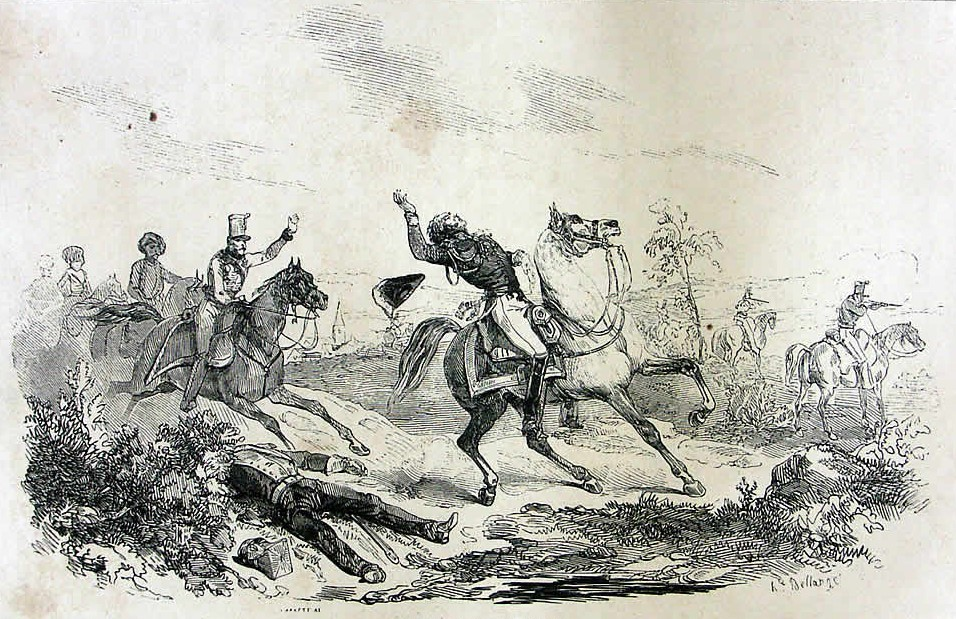
Death of Marshal Bessières at Rippach, 1 May 1813. Illustration by Hippolyte Bellangé.

In 1813, when the German campaign began, the Emperor entrusted the Duke of Istria with the command of the entire cavalry of the army, that is, in addition to the squadrons of the Guard, the I Cavalry Corps of General Latour-Maubourg, the two cavalry regiments of General Kellermann and some foreign cavalry units. On the morning of 1 May 1813, on the eve of the Battle of Lützen, the Marshal burned his wife's letters that he had until then piously preserved and, having reluctantly agreed, faced with the insistence of his officers, to take a light snack, he then said: "if a cannonball is to take me this morning, I do not want it to take me on an empty stomach." Shortly afterwards, at around 12:55 p.m., while he was leading an attack near Weißenfels, a cannonball decapitated his orderly, a Polish lancer. A second cannonball ricocheted off a wall, shattered Bessières' hand and pierced his chest, killing him instantly. Napoleon, for whom Bessières' death was an immense loss, commented: "Bessières lived like Bayard and he died like Turenne."

== Personal life ==
Jean-Baptiste Bessières was the elder brother of General of Brigade Bertrand Bessières (1773–1854), who attained this rank after Austerlitz and distinguished himself in Spain, Russia and Germany. He ended his career with the rank of lieutenant-general under the Restoration. The prefect and diplomat Julien Bessières (1777–1840) was his cousin.

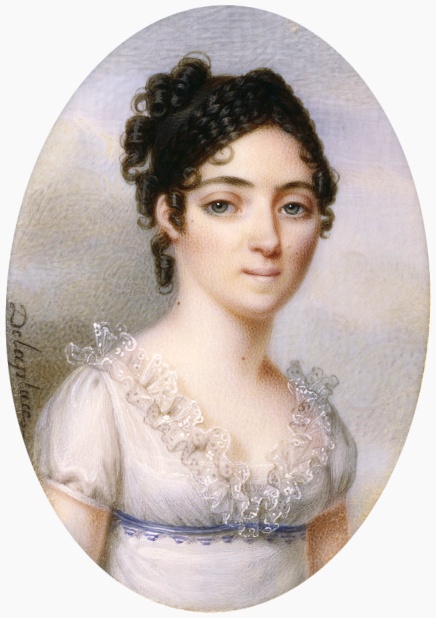
Marie-Jeanne Lapeyrière, duchesse d'Istrie

On 27 October 1801, Bessières married Marie-Jeanne Lapeyrière, the daughter of Jean-Louis Lapeyrière, a tax collector for the clergy in Cahors, and sister of art collector Augustin Lapeyrière, at the chapel of the Château de Canussel in Lacour. The couple had known each other since childhood. They had one child, Napoléon Bessières, who left no issue. Gentle, pious and reserved, Lapeyrière did not hesitate to oppose Napoleon head-on, particularly on the religious question. Bessières also had a mistress, Virginie Oreille, a young dancer at the Paris Opera.

Bessières left no fortune on his death and Napoleon took charge of settling his debts, while his widow obtained in 1815, from the Emperor of Austria, an annuity of 20,000 francs as a compensation for the loss of her endowment as Duchess of Istria, as the territory was returned to Austria at the Congress of Vienna. Their son Napoléon was made a member of the Chamber of Peers by Louis XVIII. Lapeyrière died on 4 June 1840, twenty-seven years after her husband.

== Legacy ==
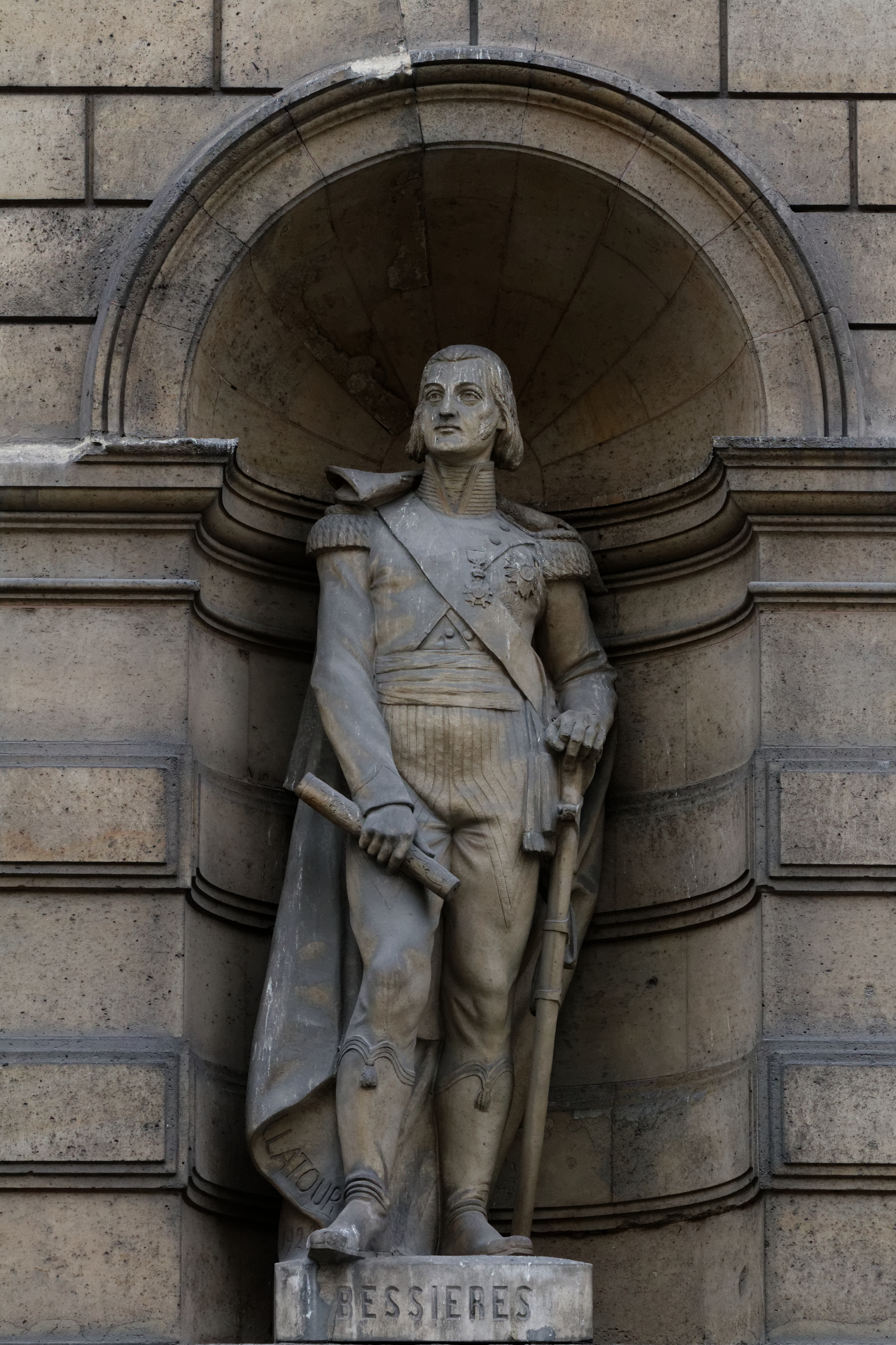
Statue of Bessières in a façade of the Louvre Palace

As a commander, Bessières proved out of his depth when leading armies. His background as the commander of Napoleon's headquarters guard, the Guides of the Army of Italy, deprived him of the wide experience his fellow marshals had earned before assuming high command. Like Murat, he was however an excellent cavalry commander and he also proved an able administrator of the Imperial Guard. His few attempts at independent command were not a success however and Napoleon thereafter preferred using Bessières as a cavalry commander.

Bessières was not of high birth but he adopted the manners and looks of a gentleman as befitting Napoleon's closest Guard commander. He typically wore the uniform of Napoleon's old guides of the Army of Italy with marshal's distinctions and wore his hair long with white powder in ancien régime style, even when the latter went out of fashion. He was known to be well mannered and kind and generous to subordinates but very touchy about his privileges and position.

== Honours ==
- France: Legion of Honour;
  - Grand Officer (14 June 1804)
  - Grand Eagle (2 February 1805)
- Italy: Commander of the Order of the Iron Crown.
- Württemberg: Grand Cross of the Order of the Golden Eagle.
- Saxony: Grand Cross of the Military Order of St. Henry.
- Portugal: Grand Cross of the Order of Christ.
- Austria: Grand Cross of the Imperial Order of Leopold.
