= Battle of Medina de Rioseco =

1808 battle of the Peninsular War

- Part of the Peninsular War
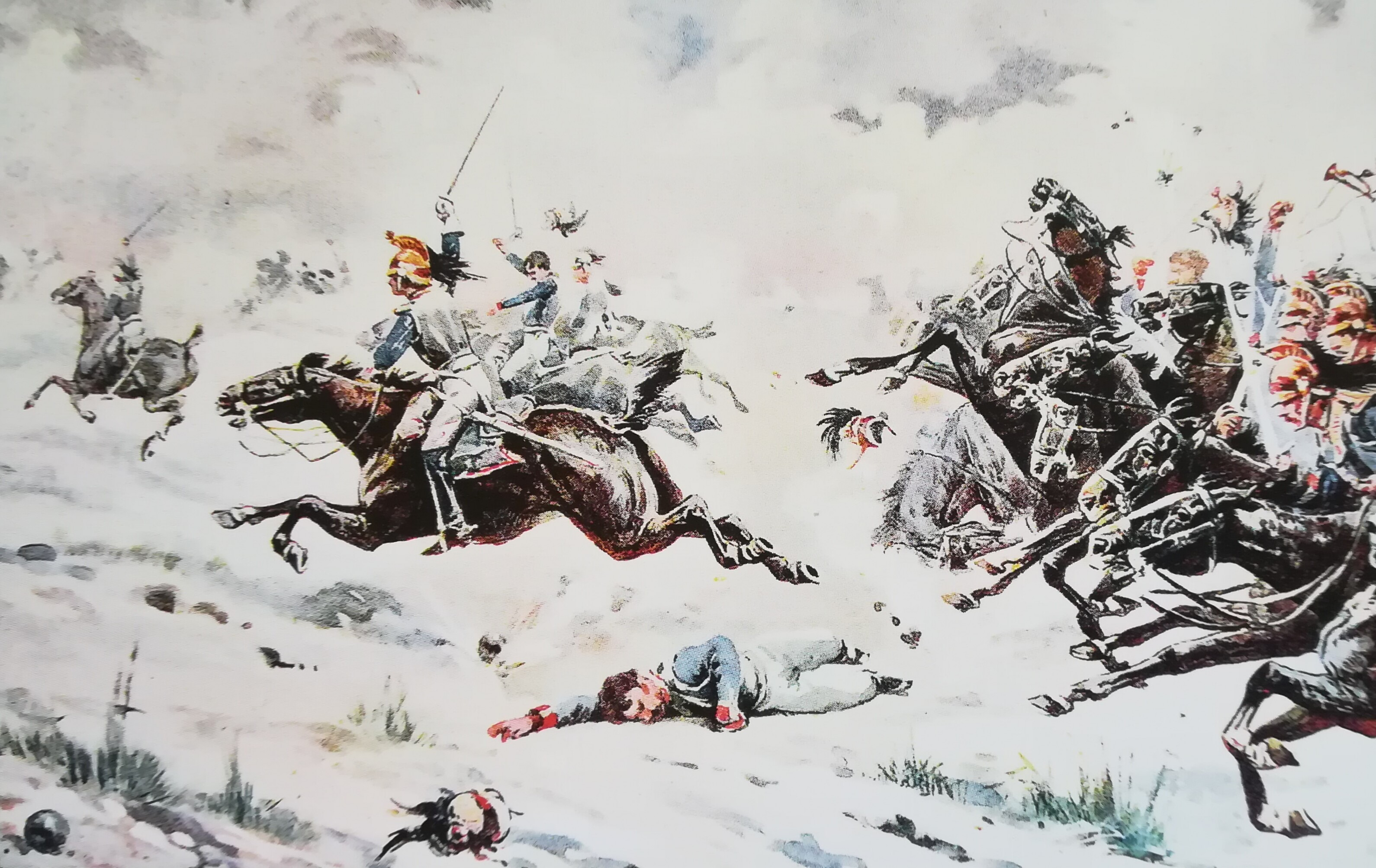
- Charge of a French cuirassier squadron at Medina de Rioseco
Date	14 July 1808
Location	Medina de Rioseco, north of Valladolid, Spain 41.8942°N 4.9936°W
Result	French victory

Belligerents
(First French Empire) France	Spain

Commanders and leaders
(First French Empire) Jean-Baptiste Bessières	(Spain) Joaquín Blake (Spain) Gregorio de la Cuesta

Strength
12,550–12,800 infantry, 950–1,200 cavalry, 32 guns	21,300–22,000 regulars and militia, 600 cavalry, 20 guns

Casualties and losses
400–500 dead or wounded	2,200–3,000+ 13 guns captured

Peninsular War: Spanish uprising 1808
current battle

The Battle of Medina de Rioseco, also known as the Battle of Moclín, was fought during the Peninsular War on 14 July 1808 when a combined body of Spanish militia and regulars moved to rupture the French line of communications to Madrid. General Joaquín Blake's Army of Galicia, under joint command with General Gregorio de la Cuesta, was routed by Marshal Bessières after a badly coordinated but stubborn fight against the French corps north of Valladolid.

Bessières exploited the poor coordination between Blake and Cuesta to defeat the Spaniards in detail, with Blake being ejected from a low ridge while Cuesta sat to the rear, and Cuesta failing to recapture the ridge with his own troops. The Army of Galicia was the only formation capable of threatening the French advance into Old Castile—Cuesta's command having been destroyed earlier at Cabezón—and its destruction marked a serious blow to Spain's national uprising.

But in the event, Medina de Rioseco proved to be the solitary French triumph in an invasion of Spain that ultimately failed to seize the country's major cities or to pacify its rebellious provinces, and which met outright disaster at Bailén, forcing French forces—Bessières' victorious corps included—to fly over the Ebro in retreat. A fresh campaign, conducted by Napoleon himself with the bulk of the Grande Armée, would be needed to redress the situation.

== Background ==
Conventional warfare in Spain started with the Battles of El Bruch.

== Situation in northern Spain ==
Recent French operations in the region had come far short of Napoleon's expectations. The Galician and Biscayan provinces were ideally suited as a base for resistance against France: remote and mountainous; out of the French Army's immediate reach yet flanking its long communications to occupied Madrid; its coastline largely secured by the allied Royal Navy, which disgorged supplies and materiel. In June, Marshal Bessières' flying column, marching on Santander in an attempt to secure French communications in Galicia and guard the coast against a possible British landing, had been forced back by popular resistance. Stung by these and other reverses, Napoleon committed more troops and formulated a new strategy. In July he ordered Bessières to renew his western offensive.

Snaking toward the French were the columns of the Army of Galicia under Blake who supplemented his force with Cuesta's motley levy of militia and regulars from isolated provincial garrisons—debris from Cuesta's destroyed Army of Old Castile.

=== Spanish preparations ===
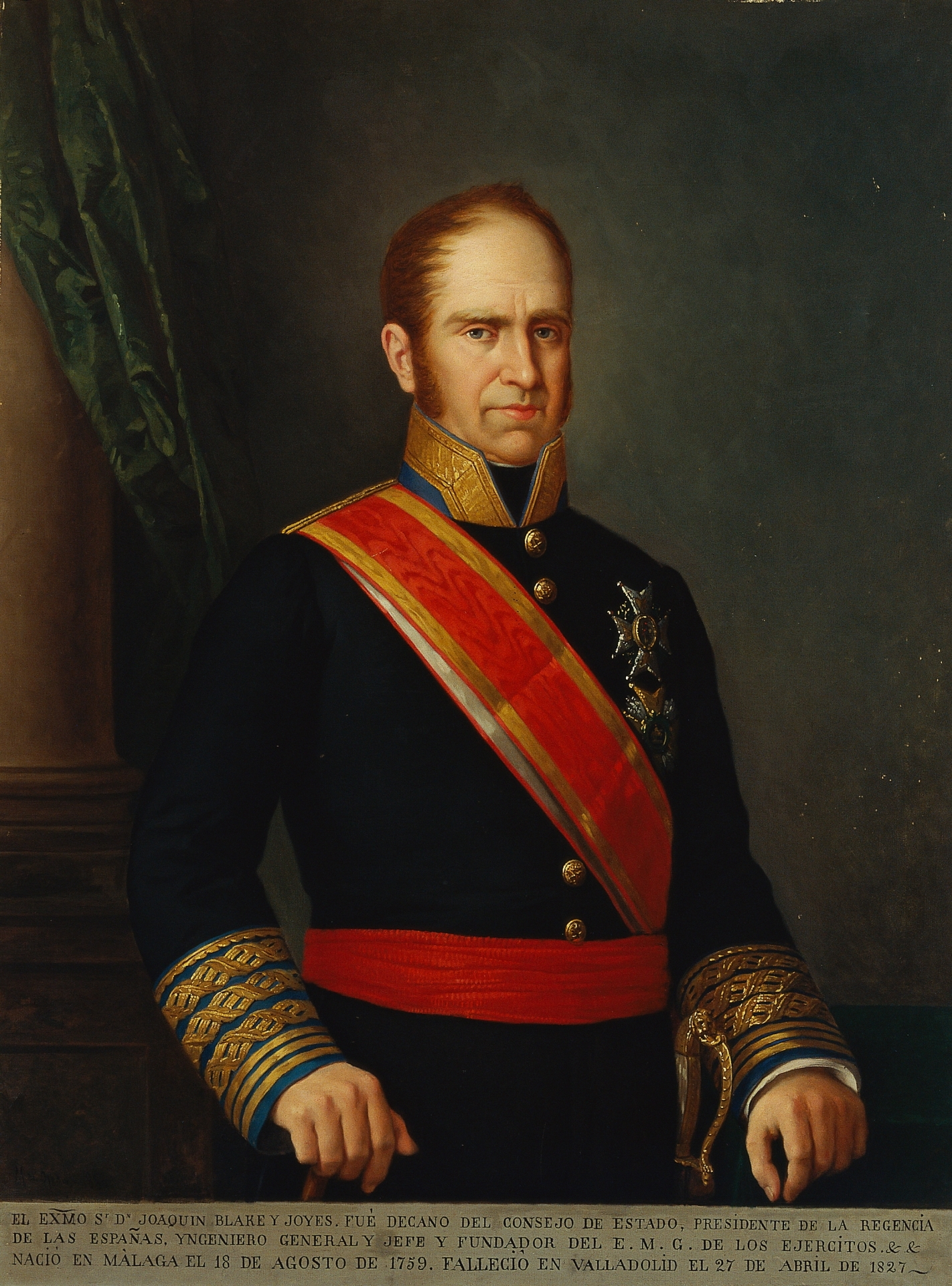
Captain-General Joaquín Blake y Joyes

Cuesta, quite undeterred by his defeat the previous month, proposed a rapid coup de main toward Valladolid, astride the French communications (and incidentally his old seat of command as Captain General of Old Castile, from which he had been ejected after his rout at Cabezón.) Cuesta mustered some 350 horse—a precious, if token, force, considering Galicia and Asturias combined could not furnish as many—and several infantry battalions, but not a single cannon. The northern Juntas received Cuesta's proposals coolly; Asturias refused to be drawn into what it considered a foolhardy scheme but committed several battalions in a show of goodwill; Galicia, however, dispatched Blake to liaison with Cuesta. A professional officer of considerable talent (albeit new to command), Blake questioned the wisdom of facing the Grande Armée in open country, preferring the broken ground and hills of the north to neutralize the superiority of French arms. Of particular concern to Blake was the dilapidated Spanish cavalry, with which a descent into the plains of Castile seemed a sorry prospect. The Galician commander advocated holding and fortifying the rugged terrain of Léon and Galicia, but deferred to Cuesta.

Between them the two Spanish generals raised about 25,000 men, many of them dispirited and in poor condition. In May British ships had disembarked some 5,000 former Spanish prisoners of war (largely captured in attacks on the Spanish colonial empire during the recent Anglo-Spanish War) with arms and munitions, notably Cuesta's 800 colonial regulars—the Colorados battalion—taken prisoner in Montevideo and, for lack of Spanish uniforms, bedecked in full redcoats. The Colorados de Buenos Aires had been taken prisoner during the unsuccessful British attacks on the Viceroyalty of the Río de la Plata. Cuesta, citing his seniority, claimed supreme command and set his columns marching on 12 July, against Blake's objections (although the Castilian was persuaded to detach a reserve at Benavente). Cuesta, for lack of cavalry, advanced blind to French movements, expecting to find Bessières concentrating near Valladolid.

By 14 July Cuesta had drawn up the Spanish force near Medina de Rio Seco, with Blake commanding the forward position on a small elevation and Cuesta hovering about a mile to the rear (near the village proper), with many of the best troops. Their meagre cavalry detachment stood by the road between the two corps.

=== French response ===
Bessières, well-informed of the Spanish plans by a spy, advanced from Burgos 9 July in the aim of preventing Blake's junction with Cuesta, resolving to concentrate his effectives en route. Receiving part of a division at Palencia on 10 July, Bessières rapidly assembled 14,000 with 40 guns and marched to meet Blake and Cuesta, approaching the Spanish positions along the cultivated plains of Medina de Rio Seco at dawn on the 14th. The French army contained elements of three divisions, decidedly mixed in quality: a reserve division (with which French commanders in Spain often had to make do), a division of veterans expedited from France, and Imperial Guard units dispatched from Madrid.

== Battle ==
Blake, separated from Cuesta by a glaring gap, faced off against the French with his flanks uncovered and his line of retreat far from secure. Bessières immediately understood his enemies' weakness and moved to seize the central position, allowing him to dispatch the two Spanish wings in detail by keeping Cuesta at bay with a screening force (Major-General Mouton) while elements of two divisions stormed the ridge under his supervision. The Imperial artillery, with twenty pieces arrayed on the Monclin Mound opposite Blake, blasted terrible holes in the Spanish ranks. Major-General Merle led the attack against Blake on the left, reaching west toward the Spanish flank, while Mouton, on the right, put up a noisy demonstration against Cuesta.

Blake reacted promptly to the menace to his position, stretching his line right to ward off encirclement and replying to the devastating French cannonades with his own batteries. Bessières' cavalry reserves then charged into the gap kept open by Mouton and tore into Blake's right flank, cracking his fragile force and driving it off the ridge in a panicked rout. Blake was saved from complete annihilation by the self-sacrifice of a lone battalion of Navarrese regulars which stood its ground against the swarming cavalry, keeping the French at bay while Blake's half of the army made good its escape over the Sequillo river.

Before Bessières could turn on Cuesta, the Spanish general, quite unwilling to follow Blake in retreat, formed his troops into columns and hurled them uphill at the Imperial army, now drawn up on the ridge. The tirailleurs screening Mouton's division were abruptly charged by 300 carabiniers and Spanish Guards and thrown into the ravine, with Spanish infantry columns advancing up the ridge behind the cavalry. The Imperial Guard horse managed temporarily to blunt the advance, flattening the weaker Spanish cavalry against its own supporting infantry columns. On the endemic weakness of the Spanish cavalry arm, see The Spanish foot, however, continued to gain ground, capturing two guns from the Artillery of the Guard and threatening the entire French position on the ridge.

Merle, however, continuing his march along its original axis, was now drawing his division upon the right flank of the second Spanish line; sensing this opportunity, Bessières ordered Merle to wheel right and plunge into the Spanish flank à la baïonnette. Mouton's chasseurs appeared on the Spanish left, and under the combined pressure the Spanish line, overlapped and plunged into disorder, ruptured. The leading Spanish grenadier battalions struck their last determined blows against the French centre before being caught in this crossfire and brusquely forced off the ridge, convincing Cuesta to sound the retreat. As with Blake's retreat, a rear guard of regular battalions held off the French while the other formations flew north to Medina.

== Aftermath ==
Spanish conventional warfare proceeded with the Capture of the Rosily Squadron.

While Cuesta and Blake both escaped the battlefield, in all other respects the rout was complete: the Army of Galicia, while numerically intact, all but ceased to exist as an army. Blake suffered most, losing 13 guns and as many as 3,000 casualties. Many veteran Spanish battalions were badly mauled in the fight for the ridge; the Colorados, for instance, were destroyed as a unit. Fearing pursuit, Cuesta channeled his infantry north to Asturias and rode off with a small cavalry corps to Salamanca, while Blake returned to Galicia.

Following Medina de Rioseco, Bessières seized Benavente, León, and Zamora, but dallied in the area while his beaten foes made good their retreat. The French were guilty of savage reprisals against both the Spanish prisoners and the populace of the neighboring cities – which, ironically, had been among the very few not carried by popular uprisings. Bessières was informed that Blake and Cuesta had separated, the former to Manzanal and the latter into Léon; both were allowed to retire unmolested when General Lasalle was uncharacteristically recalled to headquarters.

Bessières' victory greatly improved the strategic position of the French army in northern Spain, formerly the cause of much anxiety. A delighted Napoleon asserted, "if Marshal Bessières has been able to beat the Army of Galicia with few casualties and small effort, General Dupont will be able to overthrow everybody he meets." But in 16-19 July, Dupont's entire corps was broken in battle at Bailén and captured by Castaños. With 20,000 French troops erased from the map, the French command panicked and ordered a general retreat to the Ebro, undoing Bessières' hard-fought gains. News of the disaster reached Bessières 22 July, forcing him to fall back towards Madrid.

== Assessment ==
Marshal Jean-Baptiste Bessières

Medina de Rioseco was a sorely contested battle, with the Spanish infantry attack upon the ridge—conducted with "precision and audacity"—coming close to victory. The latter action especially was lauded by contemporaries; in Britain, Hamilton applauded the Spanish troops' bitter fight against the much more seasoned French Imperial Army. Cuesta's divisions (though not the commander himself) received special praise for nearly securing a dramatic victory even after Blake's rout:

The battle of Rio Seco, though unfortunate, was far from dishonourable to Spanish prowess... Under circumstances the most unfavourable and dispiriting, the second line of the Spaniards fought with a courage and pertinacity worthy of a better general... That, after the defeat of the first line, the issue of the battle should even for a time have become doubtful, is a circumstance honourable to the courage of the Spanish troops.

Another contemporary, General Maximilien Sebastien Foy, described the Spanish force at Medina de Rioseco as: "A splinter of the ancient Spanish army which demonstrated what such an army could do: for an army new to the field, facing for the first time an experienced foe, it was a lot." C'était un échantillon de l'anciènne armée espagnol, qui montra ce qu'elle aurait pu faire: c'était beaucoup pour une armée neuve qui était aux mains pour la première fois avec des troupes aguerries.

In contrast, the Blake–Cuesta partnership has been widely criticized and the tactical deployment arranged by Cuesta found wanting. One historian of Spanish military history in the Napoleonic period attributed the outcome to the fact that the Spanish generals acted at cross-purposes: "To have any hope of success, the Spaniards needed to strike fast with all their forces, but the unwilling Blake in fact moved very slowly, whilst leaving two of his four infantry divisions behind him to cover his retreat." British military historian David G. Chandler pinned the blame for the defeat squarely on Cuesta, who for reasons not quite clear to him refused to deploy his portion of the army against the enemy and planted his divisions far to the rear. Likewise, according to Foy, the Spanish deployment did not offer much prospect for success: approaching a prepared enemy frontally along the defile, with both flanks open to attack, and with such a gap between the two lines, all but guaranteed defeat. Foy, however, does not fault Blake with agreeing to a pitched battle: denuded of cavalry, the Spanish general faced the grim prospect of traversing an open countryside hounded by 1,500 French sabres under possibly the greatest cavalry commander of all time, General Lasalle.

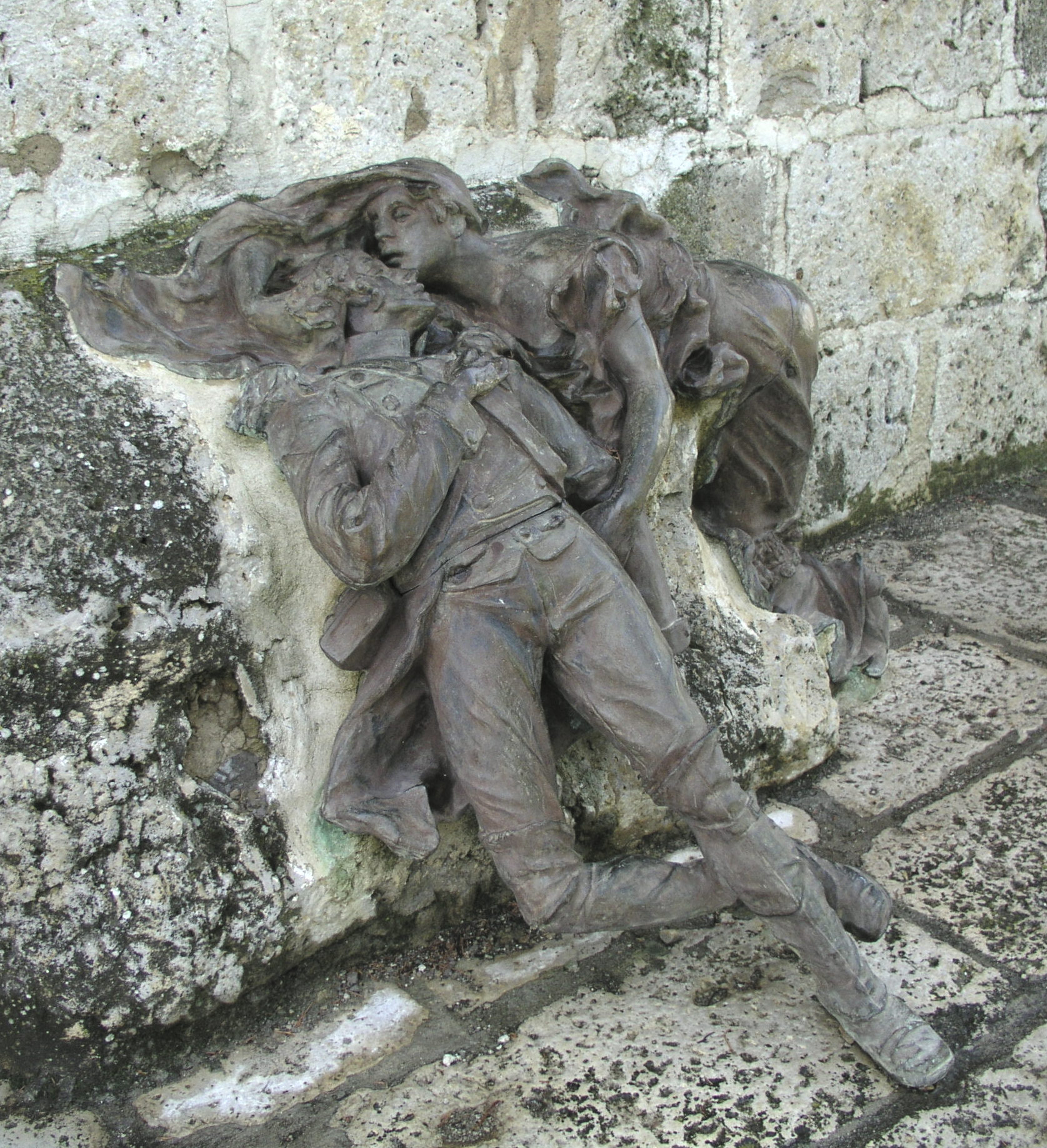
Bronze monument at Medina de Rioseco, by Aurelio Carretero (1863-1917)

== See also ==
- Timeline of the Peninsular War

== Notes ==
Preceded by Battle of Valencia (1808)	Napoleonic Wars; Battle of Medina de Rioseco	Succeeded by Battle of Bailén
