= Prayssac =

- Commune
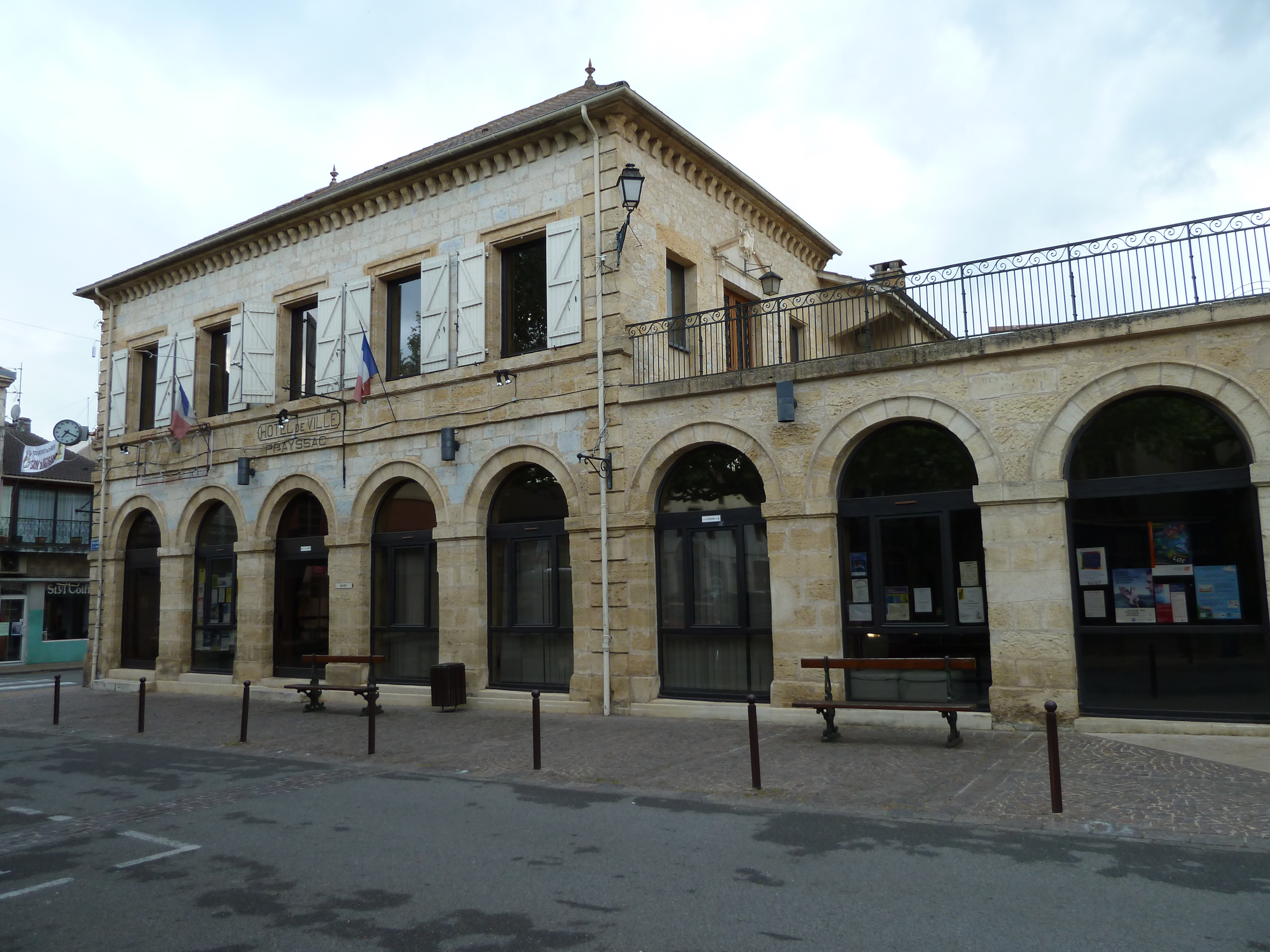
- The town hall of Prayssac

- Coat of arms
- Location of Prayssac
- Location within France Location within Occitanie
- Coordinates: 44°30′18″N 1°11′17″E
- Country: France
- Region: Occitania
- Department: Lot
- Arrondissement: Cahors
- Canton: Puy-l'Évêque
- Intercommunality: Vallée du Lot et du Vignoble

Government
  - Mayor (2020–2026): Fabienne Sigaud
- Area^{1}: 24.05 km^{2} (9.29 sq mi)
- Elevation: 107 m (351 ft)
- Highest elevation: 284 m (932 ft)
- Lowest elevation: 80 m (260 ft)
- Population (2023): 2,519
  - Density: 104.7/km^{2} (271.3/sq mi)
- Demonym: Prayssacois
- Time zone: UTC+01:00 (CET)
  - Summer (DST): UTC+02:00 (CEST)
- INSEE/Postal code: 46225 /46220
- ^{1} French Land Register data, which excludes lakes, ponds, glaciers > 1 km^{2} (0.386 sq mi or 247 acres) and river estuaries.

Prayssac (French pronunciation: [pʁɛsak]; Occitan: Praissac) is a commune in the Lot department in south-western France.

== Population ==
Historical population
Year	Pop.	±% p.a.
1968	1,975	—
1975	2,065	+0.64%
1982	2,160	+0.64%
1990	2,233	+0.42%
1999	2,300	+0.33%
2007	2,428	+0.68%
2012	2,511	+0.67%
2017	2,397	−0.92%
2023	2,519	+0.83%
Source: INSEE

== Notable people ==
- Birthplace of Jean-Baptiste Bessières, Duke of Istrie

== See also ==
- Communes of the Lot department
