= Battle of Montereau =

1814 battle during the War of the Sixth Coalition

- Part of the Campaign of France of the Sixth Coalition
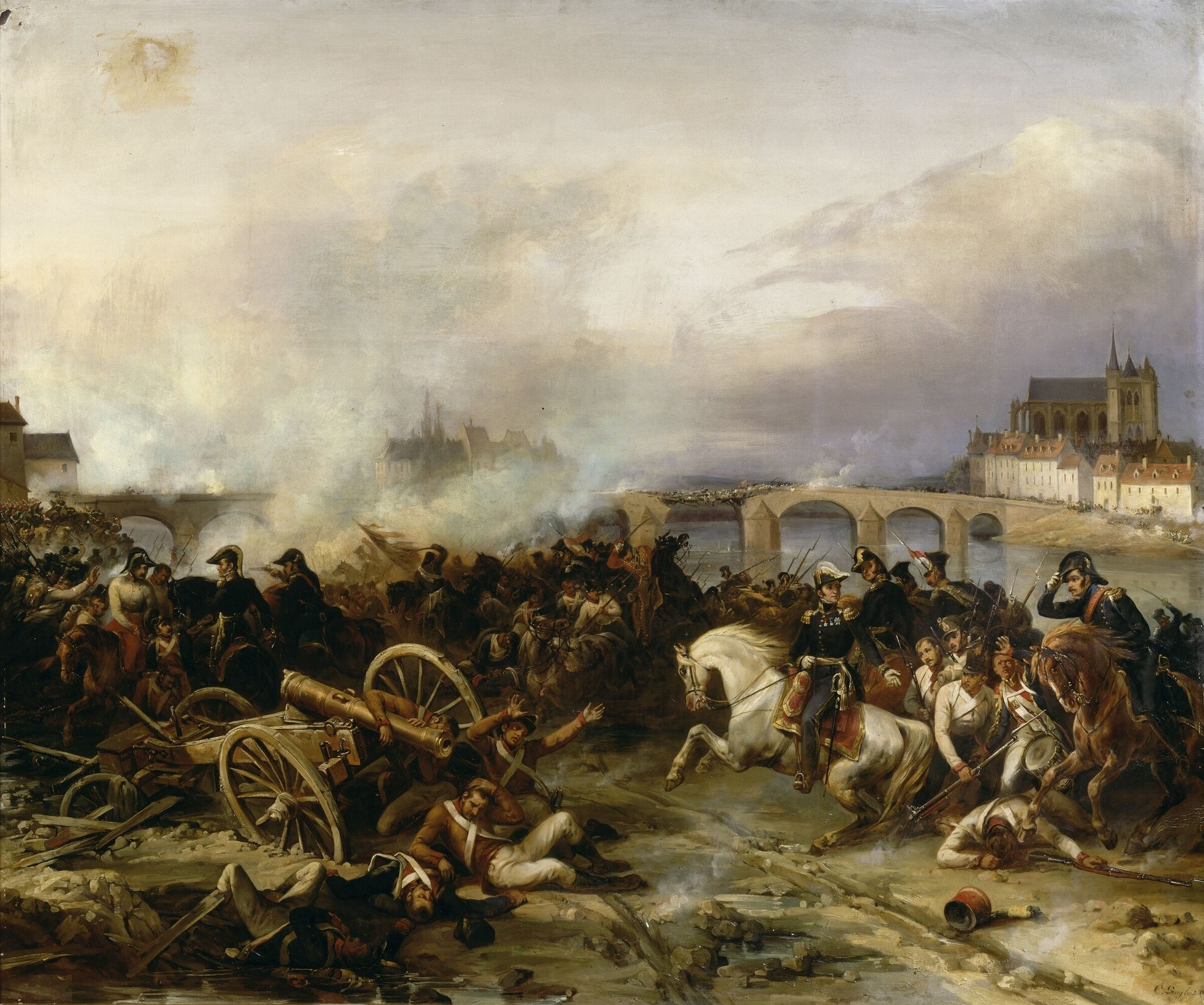
- Battle of Montereau, 18 February 1814 by Jean-Charles Langlois (1840)
Date	18 February 1814
Location	Montereau-Fault-Yonne, French Empire 48.40°N 2.95°E
Result	French victory

Belligerents
(First French Empire) France	(Austrian Empire) Austria (Kingdom of Württemberg) Württemberg

Commanders and leaders
(First French Empire) Napoleon Bonaparte	(Austrian Empire) Prince of Schwarzenberg (Kingdom of Württemberg) Prince of Württemberg

Strength
30,000; 70–80 guns	15,000–18,000; 40 guns

Casualties and losses
2,000–3,000 killed, wounded, or captured	5,000–6,000 killed, wounded, or captured 2–15 guns lost
- Location within France

War of the Sixth Coalition:
Campaign in north-east France
current battle
Napoleon in command
Napoleon not in command

The Battle of Montereau (18 February 1814) was fought during the War of the Sixth Coalition between an Imperial French army led by Emperor Napoleon and a corps of Austrians and Württembergers commanded by Crown Prince Frederick William of Württemberg. While Napoleon's army mauled an Allied army under Gebhard Leberecht von Blücher, the main Allied army commanded by Karl Philipp, Prince of Schwarzenberg, advanced to a position dangerously close to Paris. Gathering up his outnumbered forces, Napoleon rushed his soldiers south to deal with Schwarzenberg. Hearing of the approach of the French emperor, the Allied commander ordered a withdrawal, but on 17 February saw his rear guards overrun or brushed aside.

Ordered to hold Montereau until nightfall on 18 February, the Crown Prince of Württemberg posted a strong force on the north bank of the Seine River. All morning and past noon, the Allies stoutly held off a series of French attacks. However, under increasing French pressure, the Crown Prince's lines buckled in the afternoon and his troops ran for the single bridge to their rear. Brilliantly led by Pierre Claude Pajol, the French cavalry got among the fugitives, captured the spans over both the Seine and Yonne Rivers and seized Montereau. The Allied force suffered heavy losses, and the defeat confirmed Schwarzenberg's decision to continue the retreat to Troyes.

== Background ==
=== Allied advance ===
On 10 February, the Army of Bohemia under Karl Philipp, Prince of Schwarzenberg began advancing from Troyes. On the right, Peter Wittgenstein and Karl Philipp von Wrede headed for Nogent-sur-Seine and Bray-sur-Seine on the Seine River supported by the Guards and Reserves. On the left, Crown Prince Frederick William of Württemberg moved on Sens with the I Corps of Frederick Bianchi, Duke of Casalanza on his left. The left flank forces were backed by Ignác Gyulay's corps. The Allies were briefly checked at Nogent on 10 February by 1,000 French troops under Louis-Auguste-Victor, Count de Ghaisnes de Bourmont. Sens was taken on 11 February after a skirmish between the Crown Prince and Jacques Alexandre Allix de Vaux.

Tasked with the defense of the Seine, Marshal Claude-Victor Perrin held Nogent and Marshal Nicolas Oudinot defended Montereau-Fault-Yonne. On 12 February the Allies captured Bray from a weak force of French National Guards as well as the bridge at Pont-sur-Seine near Montereau-Fault-Yonne. Afraid of being surrounded, Victor evacuated Nogent and fell back. The appearance of troops under Marshal Jacques MacDonald did not stop the retreat and by 15 February the French were moving back to the Yerres River only 18 miles (29 km) from Paris. Alexander Nikitich Seslavin led a scouting force of three Russian hussar squadrons and one Cossack regiment well to the south to seize Montargis and threaten Orléans. Auxerre was stormed and its garrison wiped out. Cossacks roamed freely in the Forest and Palace of Fontainebleau. When Victor's wagon train appeared at Charenton-le-Pont the Parisians were thrown into panic. Meanwhile, fleeing peasants reported that Paris would soon be attacked by 200,000 Cossacks.

=== French counteroffensive ===
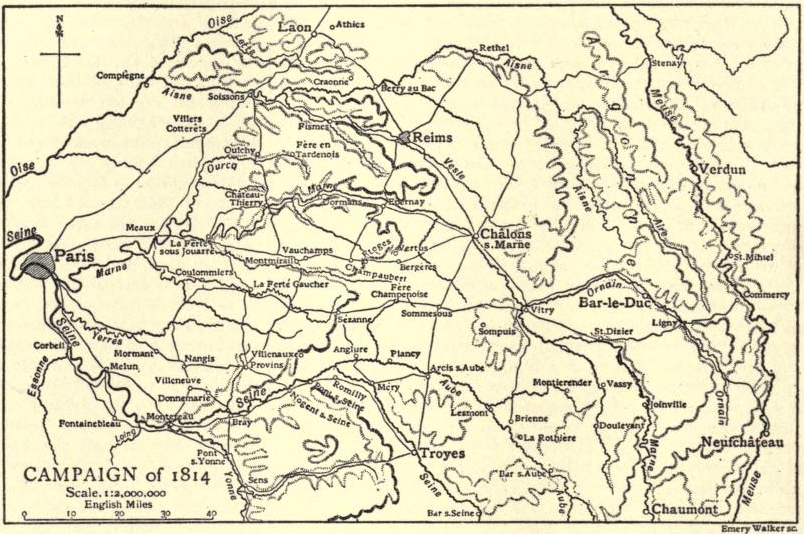
Campaign of 1814 map shows Montereau on the Seine at the lower left.

Following his successes in the Six Days' Campaign on 10–14 February 1814, Emperor Napoleon headed southward towards the Seine to stop Schwarzenberg's threat to Paris. Forces under Marshals Édouard Mortier and Auguste Marmont were left behind to keep Gebhard Leberecht von Blücher's Army of Silesia under observation. Giving up his plans to finish off Blücher, Napoleon left Montmirail on 15 February with the Imperial Guard and Emmanuel Grouchy's cavalry. In an epic march, with some infantry traveling in carts and wagons, Napoleon's leading forces reached Guignes at 3:00 pm on the 16th after moving 47 miles (76 km) in 36 hours. Another authority stated that some troops marched 60 miles (97 km) in 36 hours.

Hearing of Blücher's defeat and the approach of Napoleon, the cautious Schwarzenberg scrambled to put the Seine between his army and the French emperor. On 17 February, he ordered Wittgenstein to retreat to Provins while Michael Andreas Barclay de Tolly massed the Russian and Prussian Guards near Nogent. He instructed Wrede to fall back to Donnemarie while leaving an advanced guard at Nangis. Württemberg and Bianchi were posted near Montereau while Gyulai held Pont-sur-Yonne and the Austrian Reserve was at Sens. If the Army of Bohemia needed to retreat farther, it was important to hold the position at Montereau. Matvei Platov was to the west at Nemours where his 2,100 Cossacks captured 600 men of an Imperial Guard depot battalion on the 16th.

Early on 17 February, Napoleon's leading elements under Etienne Maurice Gérard enveloped a Russian force led by Peter Petrovich Pahlen. In the Battle of Mormant, Pahlen's 2,500 infantry and 1,250 cavalry were overwhelmed by the French, suffering 3,114 killed, wounded or captured. A nearby Austrian force led by Anton von Hardegg remained largely inert while its allies were being cut to pieces. Finally, Hardegg allowed 550 troopers from the Schwarzenberg Uhlan Regiment Nr. 2 to assist the Russians. The Reval and Selenginsk Infantry Regiments suffered such heavy losses that they were withdrawn from the campaign. Next, the French struck Wrede's advance guard at Nangis and threw it back to Villeneuve-le-Comte.

At Nangis Napoleon split his army into three columns. The right column including Victor's II Corps, Gerard's Reserve of Paris and cavalry under Samuel-François Lhéritier and Étienne Tardif de Pommeroux de Bordesoulle took the road south toward Montereau. The center column consisted of MacDonald's XI Corps, two cavalry divisions and the Imperial Guard. This force headed for Bray. The left column, made up of Oudinot's VII Corps and François Étienne de Kellermann's cavalry, pursued Wittgenstein east toward Provins. Pierre Claude Pajol's cavalry and Michel-Marie Pacthod's National Guards set out from Melun and advanced southeast toward Montereau. The divisions of Allix and Henri François Marie Charpentier moved south from Melun to Fontainebleau. MacDonald and Oudinot pressed Hardegg's rear guard back, capturing some wagons. Victor came across one of Wrede's divisions drawn up on the heights of Valjouan near Villeneuve. Victor sent Gérard to attack the Bavarians in front while Bordesoulle circled to take them from behind. Soon the Bavarians were retreating in disorder and Lhéritier missed a chance to deliver the coup de grace with his cavalry. Nevertheless, Wrede's corps sustained 2,500 casualties during the day. Victor's soldiers were exhausted, so he called a halt. Napoleon was furious that Victor disobeyed his orders to press on to Montereau during the night and asked his chief of staff Louis-Alexandre Berthier to write him a harsh reprimand.

== Battle ==
=== Forces ===
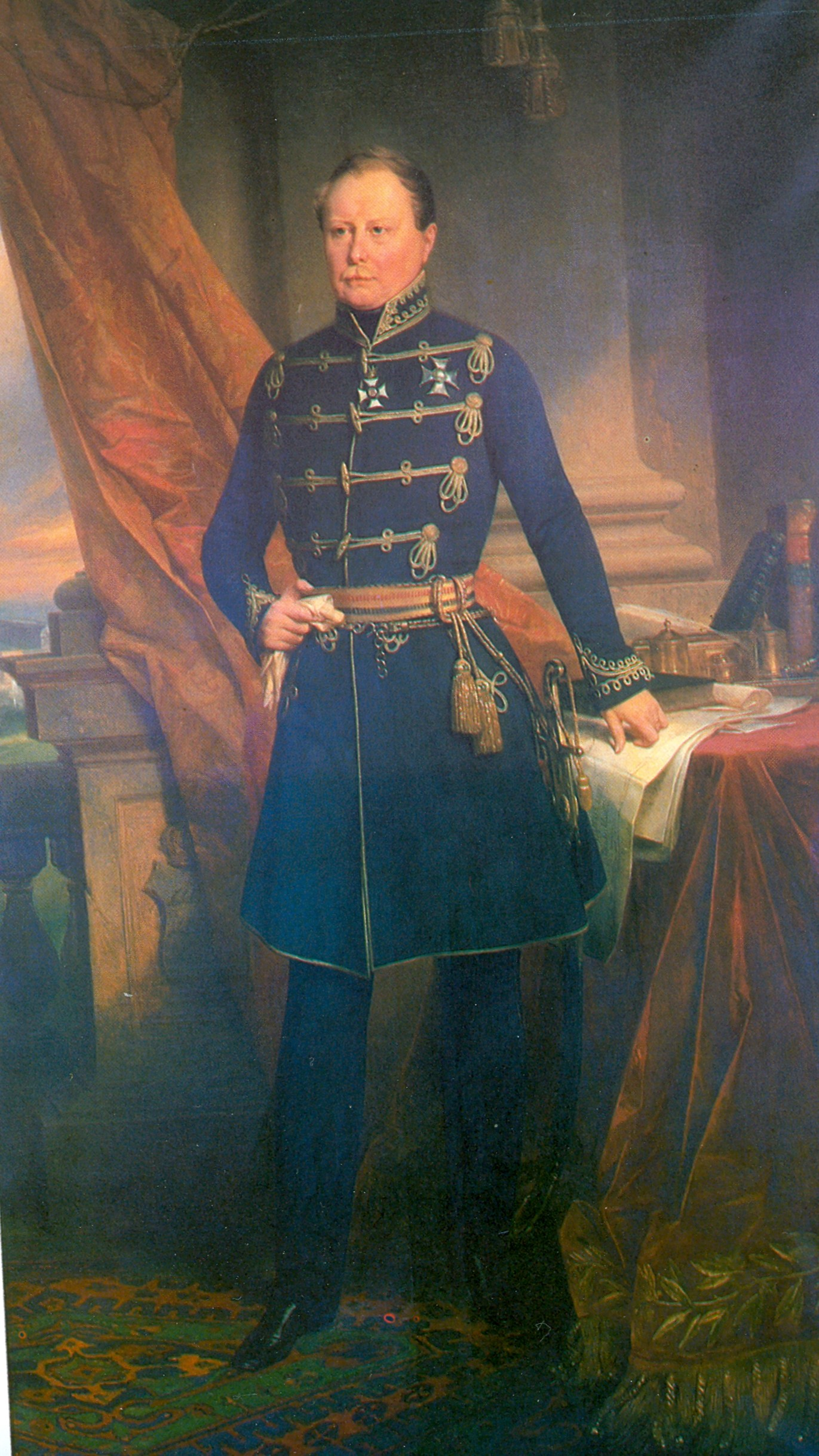
Prince Frederick William

The Crown Prince's IV Corps consisted of an infantry division led by Christian Johann Gottgetreu von Koch and a cavalry division under Prince Adam von Württemberg. Ludwig Stockmeyer's brigade consisted of two battalions of King Frederick Jäger Regiment Nr. 9 and one battalion of Light Infantry Regiment Nr. 10. Christoph Friedrich David Döring's brigade was made up of two battalions each of Infantry Regiments Duke Wilhelm Nr. 2, Nr. 3 and Nr. 7. Prince Karl von Hohenlohe-Kirchberg's brigade included two battalions each of Infantry Regiments Nr. 4 and Crown Prince Nr. 6. Walsleben's cavalry brigade comprised four squadrons each of Duke Louis Jäger zu Pferde Regiment Nr. 2 and Crown Prince Dragoon Regiment Nr. 3. Karl August Maximillian Jett's cavalry brigade had four squadrons of Prince Adam Jäger zu Pferde Regiment Nr. 4. Attached to each cavalry brigade was one horse artillery battery while Döring's and Hohenlohe's brigades each had a foot artillery battery. All four batteries were armed with four 6-pound cannons and two howitzers.

Attached to the IV Corps was Joseph Schäffer's Austrian brigade. This unit consisted of two battalions each of Infantry Regiments Gyulai Nr. 21, Esterhazy Nr. 32 and Josef Colloredo Nr. 57, three battalions of Infantry Regiment Zach Nr. 15, six squadrons of Archduke Ferdinand Hussar Regiment Nr. 3 and two-foot artillery batteries. Altogether there were 11,000 Württembergers and 4,000 Austrians present. A second source credited the Allies with 18,000 troops in Montereau.

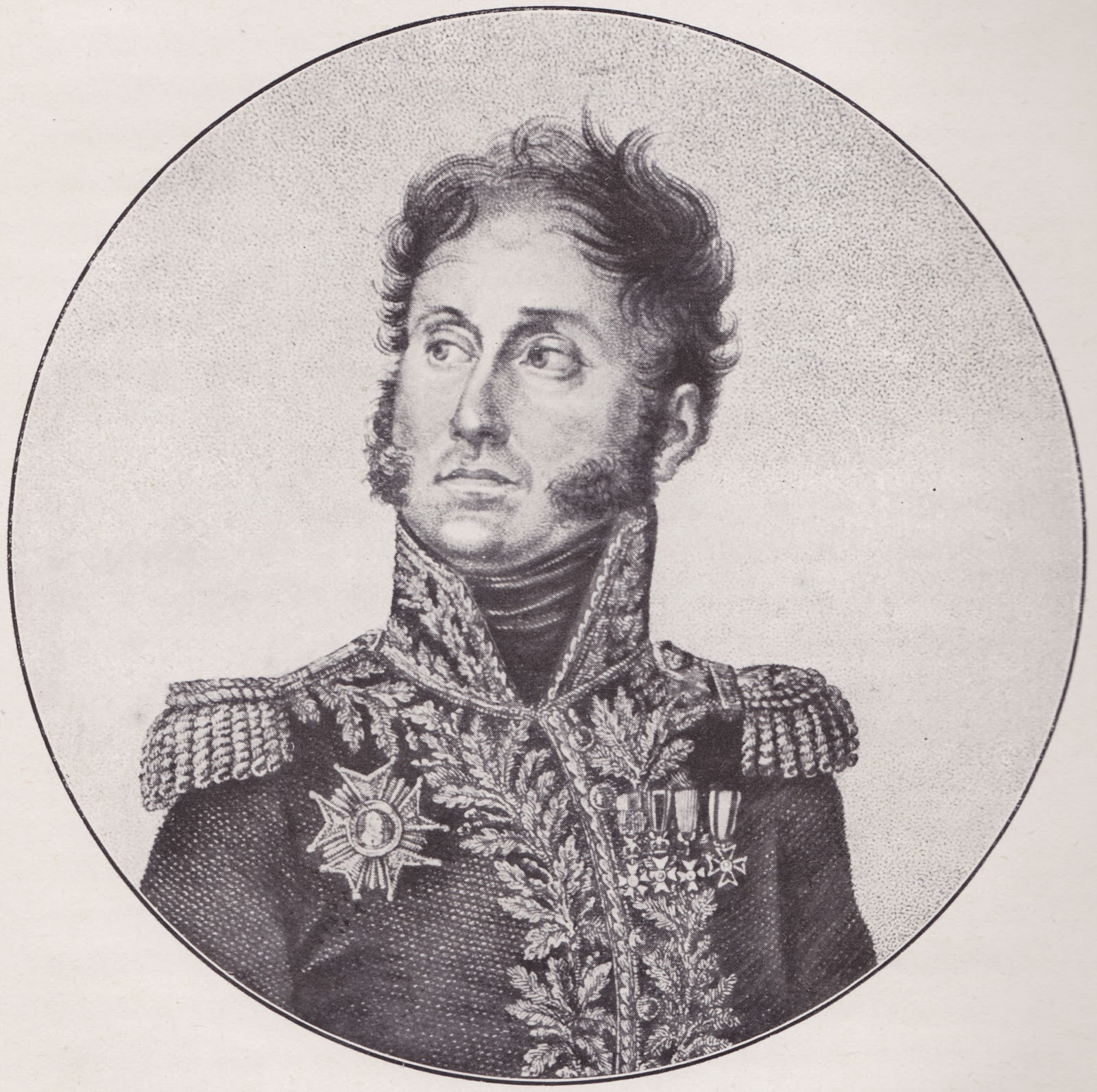
Pierre Claude Pajol

Victor's II Corps had the divisions of Louis Huguet-Chateau and Guillaume Philibert Duhesme. Chateau's 1st Division was made up of 1st Battalions of the 11th and 24th Light and the 2nd, 19th, 37th and 56th Line Infantry Regiments. Duhesme's 2nd Division included 1st and 2nd Battalions of the 4th, 18th and 46th Line and 1st Battalions of the 72nd and 93rd Line and 26th Light. Chateau's division numbered only 1,536 officers and men, since all units except the 477-strong 19th were sadly understrength, while Duhesme had 2,442 effectives. The 1st Division was supported by five 6-pound cannons and one howitzer while the 2nd Division counted eight 6-pound cannons and four howitzers. With 475 gunners and 135 sappers, Victor's total strength was 4,588 soldiers. Gérard's Reserve of Paris included the divisions of Georges Joseph Dufour and Jacques Félix Jan de La Hamelinaye. The 1st Division was made up of one battalion each of the 5th, 12th, 15th and 29th Light and the 32nd, 58th and 135th Line. The 2nd Division comprised the 26th, 82nd, 86th, 121st, 122nd and 142nd Line. Gérard's force had 214 artillerists from three companies attached.

Pajol led a provisional cavalry corps consisting of three small brigades, 460 Chasseurs à Cheval under Jacques-Antoine-Adrien Delort, 476 Dragoons under François Grouvel and 400 Hussars under Charles Yves César Du Coetlosquet. Pacthod commanded 3,000 National Guards and there were 800 gendarmes (military police) with this column. MacDonald's XI Corps counted three divisions led by Joseph Jean Baptiste Albert, François Pierre Joseph Amey and Michel Sylvestre Brayer. Lhéritier commanded the V Cavalry Corps which was formed from three mounted divisions. Hippolyte Piré's 3rd Light Cavalry Division included the 14th, 26th and 27th Chasseurs à Cheval and the 3rd Hussars, André Louis Briche's 3rd Heavy Cavalry Division the 2nd, 6th, 11th, 13th and 15th Dragoons and Lhéritier's 4th Cavalry Division the 18th, 19th, 20th, 22nd and 25th Dragoons. Bordesoulle's detachment numbered 500 horsemen from depot squadrons.

The Imperial Guard consisted of the Old Guard Division of Louis Friant, the 1st Young Guard Division of Claude Marie Meunier, the 2nd Young Guard Division of Philibert Jean-Baptiste Curial, and the 2nd and 3rd Guard Cavalry Divisions. Marshal Michel Ney led the two Young Guard divisions while Étienne Marie Antoine Champion de Nansouty led the Guard cavalry divisions. The 2nd Guard Cavalry was made up of the 1st Polish Guard Lancer, Empress Dragoon and Polish and 3rd Éclaireur Regiments. The 3rd Guard Cavalry Division had the Guard Horse Grenadier and Guard Chasseurs à Cheval Regiments. According to one authority, units that fought in the battle included most of the regiments from the corps of Victor and Gérard, the Guard artillery, Guard Chasseurs à Cheval and 2nd Guard Lancers, 3rd Hussars from Jacques Gervais, baron Subervie's brigade, 18th Dragoons of Auguste Lamotte's brigade, 25th Dragoons from Jean Antoine de Collaert's brigade, 9th Lancers and 22nd Chasseurs à Cheval from Kellermann's VI Cavalry Corps and the 7th Lancers, 9th Chasseurs à Cheval and 7th Hussars from unidentified corps. MacDonald's corps and the Guard infantry were not engaged.

=== Action ===
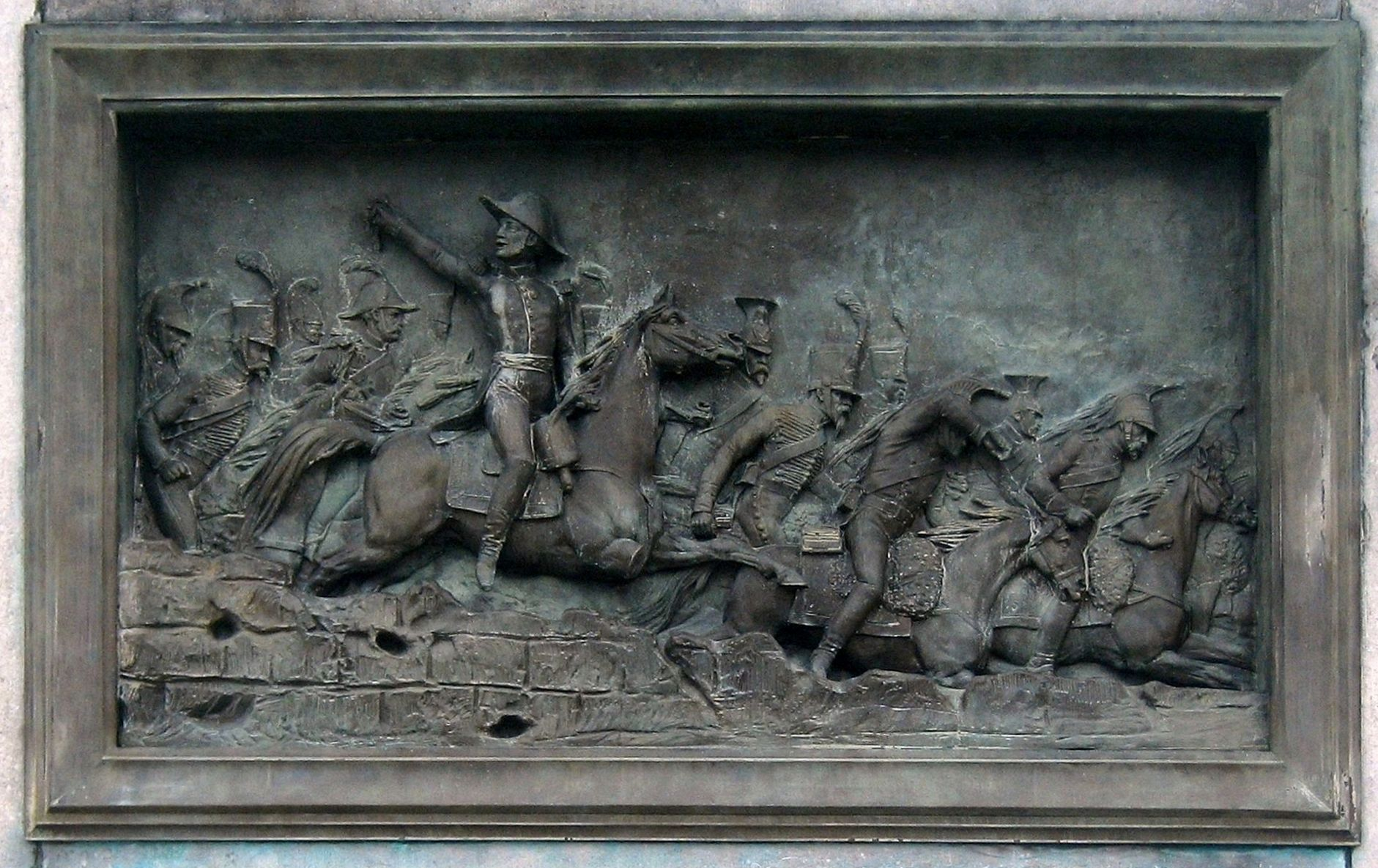
Pajol leading the charge at Montereau.

After issuing conflicting orders concerning the defense of Montereau, Schwarzenberg finally directed the Crown Prince to hold the town until the evening of 18 February. Meanwhile, Oudinot's leading troops found that Wittgenstein had withdrawn across the Seine at Nogent while Wrede was across at Bray. At both places, the Allies broke the bridges. While Montereau on the south bank is in flat terrain, the north bank is crowned by a 150–200 feet (46–61 m) height with a steep slope next to the river and a gentler slope on the north side. Atop the ridge, Surville chateau overlooks the bridges and town of Montereau, which was surrounded by vineyards and meadows to the south and east. The Paris road approached Montereau from the northwest where there was a forest. The road from Salins came from the northeast and ran alongside the river from Courbeton chateau to the bridge. The hamlet of Les Ormeaux was a short distance east of the Paris road. The roads from the north join at the bridge which crosses the Seine to the eastern suburb, then immediately crosses the Yonne into Montereau. The Seine bridge was the site of the Assassination of John the Fearless, Duke of Burgundy in 1419.

Battle of Montereau map (8am-1pm)

The Crown Prince deployed 8,500-foot soldiers, 1,000 horsemen and 26 field guns on the north bank of the Seine. A second authority counted 12,000 defenders. The left flank was anchored in Les Ormeaux, the center incorporated the Surville chateau and park while the right flank included the Courbeton chateau and blocked the road from Salins. Two Austrian batteries from Bianchi's corps were positioned on the south bank, one covering each flank. There was also a IV Corps brigade on the south bank near the eastern suburb at the Motteux Farm. Schäffer's Austrians held the Surville park in the center. The Allies were supported by a total of 40 field pieces.

Napoleon ordered Victor to be at Montereau at 6:00 am but the first French forces to arrive were Pajol's cavalry and Pacthod's National Guards at 8:00 am. Aside from numbering no more than 4,500 men, the horsemen had almost no training while the National Guards were ill-equipped and ill-trained. They made no impression on the Crown Prince's defenders. Victor leading elements arrived at 9:00 am and their initial attack was repulsed. When the divisions of Chateau and Duhesme reached the field they were thrown into an attack on Les Ormeaux. This was beaten back and Chateau, who was Victor's son-in-law, was fatally wounded. The Württemberg cavalry charged and drove the French horsemen back into the forest. Unable to make any progress by 11:00 am, Victor awaited the coming of Gérard's corps. Angry at the marshal's slowness, Napoleon replaced Victor and placed command of the II Corps in Gérard's hands.

Battle of Montereau map (2 pm - 6 pm)

Gérard led his troops up the heights but the Allied artillery was well-served and threw back assault after assault. In the afternoon, the Imperial Guard artillery arrived and 40 more guns were brought into action. At 3:00 pm, Napoleon hurled three attack columns at Les Ormeaux and Surville and another one against the Allied right flank along the Seine. While the Guard remained in reserve, the French artillery unleashed a barrage at Surville chateau. The French finally overran Les Ormeaux, causing the Crown Prince to order Schäffer's Austrians to cover the retreat. As the Württembergers began pulling back, Pajol launched a cavalry charge down the Paris highway against the Allied left flank. At this time, French infantry rushed the Surville chateau and made its garrison prisoners. There were now 30,000 French troops on the field supported by 70 or 80 field pieces.

At first the withdrawal was conducted in good order, but the Allied soldiers became more disorganized as they tried to negotiate the steep slope. They fell into complete confusion upon encountering a sunken road. Soon, every Allied soldier was running for the Seine bridge. The Crown Prince tried to rally his men and was nearly captured by the French cavalry. The French emperor ordered 60 guns onto the Surville heights where they unlimbered and fired their missiles into the fleeing mob of Allies crowding the bridges. When Napoleon personally sighted one of the cannons, his guardsmen begged him to leave. He refused saying, "Courage my friends, the bullet which is to kill me is not yet cast".

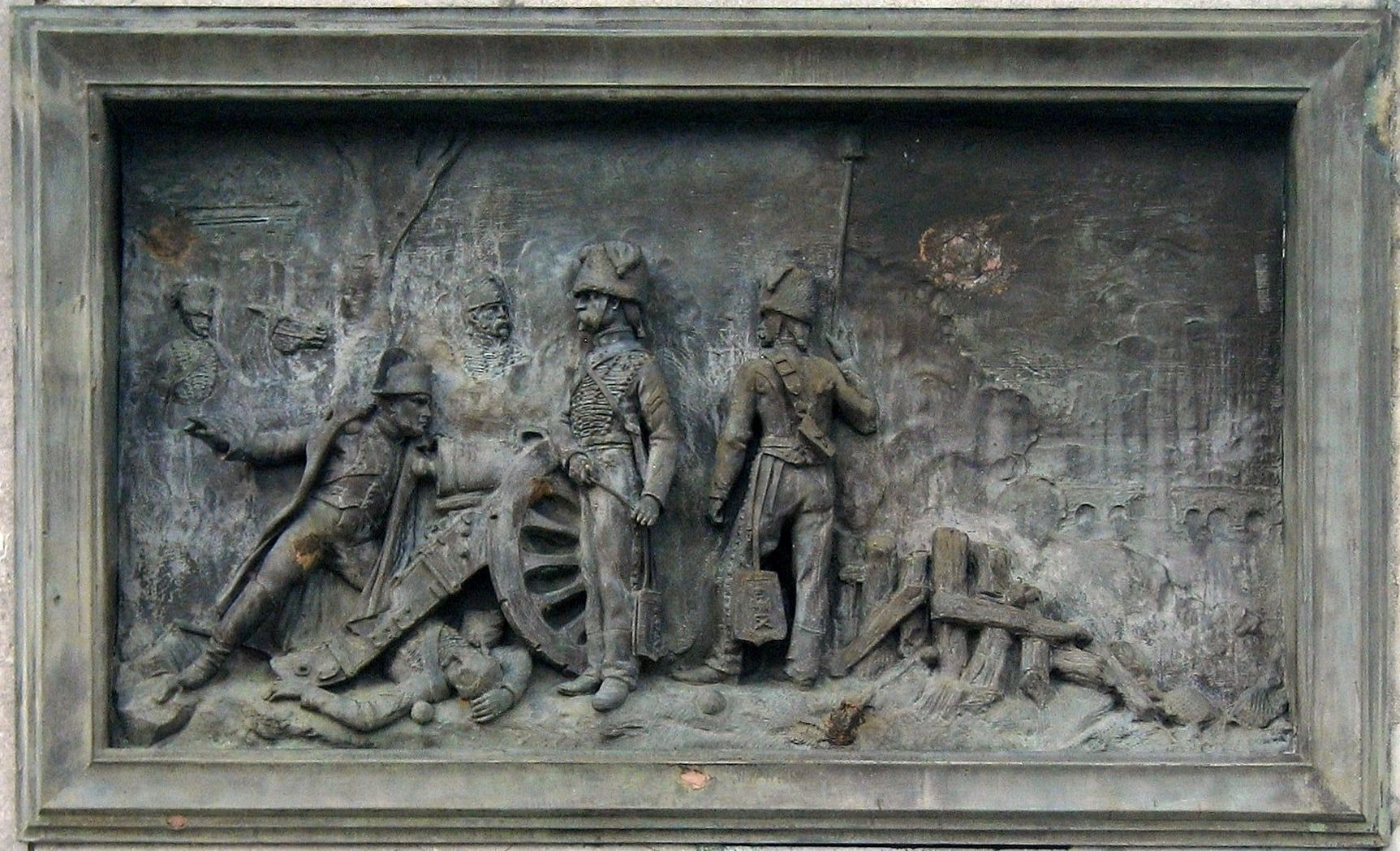
Napoleon aiming a cannon at Montereau.

Pajol's horsemen charged into the fleeing mass of soldiers and managed to seize first the Seine bridge and then the Yonne bridge before either could be blown up, though they were rigged for demolition. Duhesme's division rapidly crossed after the cavalry and helped clear Montereau of the Allies. The beaten Allies joined Hohenlohe's brigade and began a disorderly retreat toward Le Tombe, a village on the road to Bray. The movement was covered by Jett's cavalry brigade. Napoleon sent Marshal François Joseph Lefebvre and his own cavalry escort in pursuit toward Bray. An eyewitness wrote that Lefebvre foamed at the mouth and struck at Allied soldiers with his saber.

== Results ==
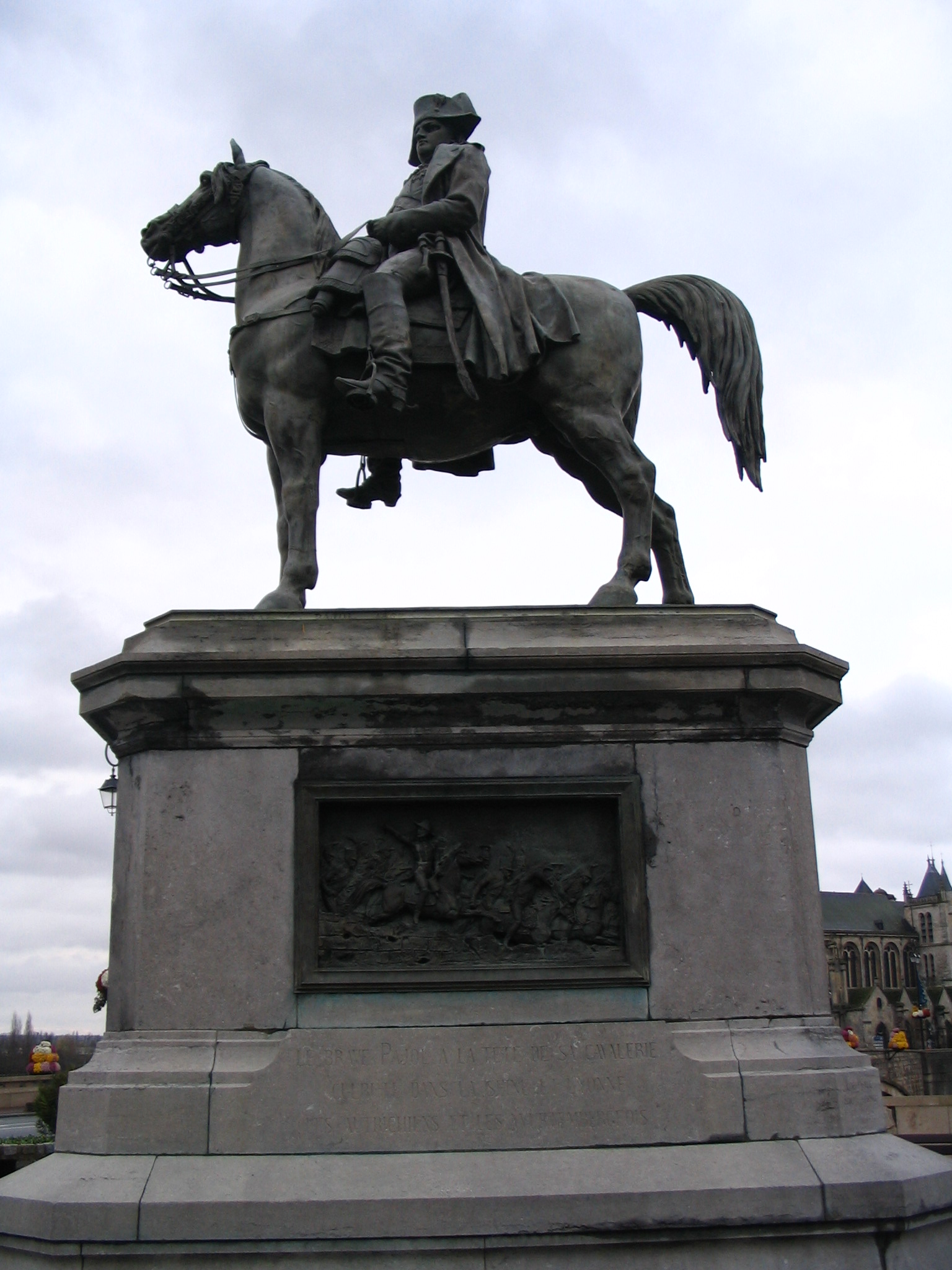
Statue of Napoleon stands between the two bridges.

According to Digby Smith, the Allies had losses of 1,400 killed and wounded, of which the Württembergers lost 92 killed and 714 wounded; Prince Hohenlohe was killed. The French captured 3,600 men, two cannons and two ammunition wagons. Of these totals, the Austrians had about 2,000 casualties and Schäffer became a French prisoner. The French lost 2,000 killed and wounded. A source quoted by Smith gave 4,895 Allied casualties and 15 guns lost. Francis Loraine Petre asserted that the Allies lost nearly 5,000 men and 15 field pieces. David G. Chandler stated that the Allies suffered 6,000 casualties and lost 15 cannons; the French lost 2,500 casualties. Another authority wrote that both the French and Allies lost 3,000 killed and wounded, while the French took 2,000 men, six guns and four colors. Chateau died from his wounds on 8 May 1814.

The victory failed to live up to Napoleon's expectations. He lamented, "The foe has enjoyed a stroke of rare good fortune, the heavy frosts permitted him to move over the fields – otherwise at least half his guns and transport would have been taken." In his disappointment he turned on his generals. After the battle when Victor complained to the emperor about losing his command, Napoleon unleashed a storm of abuse on his hapless subordinate. He also raged against Victor's wife whom he accused of snubbing Empress Marie Louise. Victor managed to blunt his sovereign's fury by recalling their military exploits in Italy and by reminding Napoleon that his son-in-law Chateau lay dying. Finally, Napoleon relented and gave him the two Young Guard divisions of Charpentier and Joseph Boyer de Rebeval. Other generals who felt Napoleon's wrath at this time were Lhéritier for failing to charge at Valjouan, Jean François Aimé Dejean for not providing enough artillery ammunition and Claude-Étienne Guyot for losing some cannons.

Even before the battle started, Schwarzenberg ordered a general withdrawal to Troyes. He ordered Wrede to hold Bray until nightfall on 19 February and sent a dispatch to Blücher asking him to support his right flank at Méry-sur-Seine on 21 February. The Prussian replied that he would be at the rendezvous with 53,000 troops and 300 guns. With Montereau in French hands, the position of the Austrians on the left flank along the Loing River became precarious. Under the guise of negotiations with Allix, they retreated to join the wreckage of Schäffer's brigade at Saint-Sérotin. Seslavin was ordered to relinquish his far left flank position and take a position on the opposite flank. Napoleon's pursuit was hampered by a lack of bridges and the Allies got a two-day head start in the march to Troyes. The next series of actions between the two armies started at Méry-sur-Seine on 22 February and led to the Battle of Bar-sur-Aube.

== Battlefield today ==
Currently, part of this historic battle site near the village of Montereau-Fault-Yonne has been proposed for development as a theme park celebrating the life of French Emperor Napoleon Bonaparte. The park, Napoleonland, was originally set for completion in 2017.

== Footnotes ==
Preceded by Battle of Mormant	Napoleonic Wars; Battle of Montereau	Succeeded by Battle of Orthez
