= Battle of Arnhem (1813) =

1813 battle during the War of the Sixth Coalition

- Part of the War of the Sixth Coalition
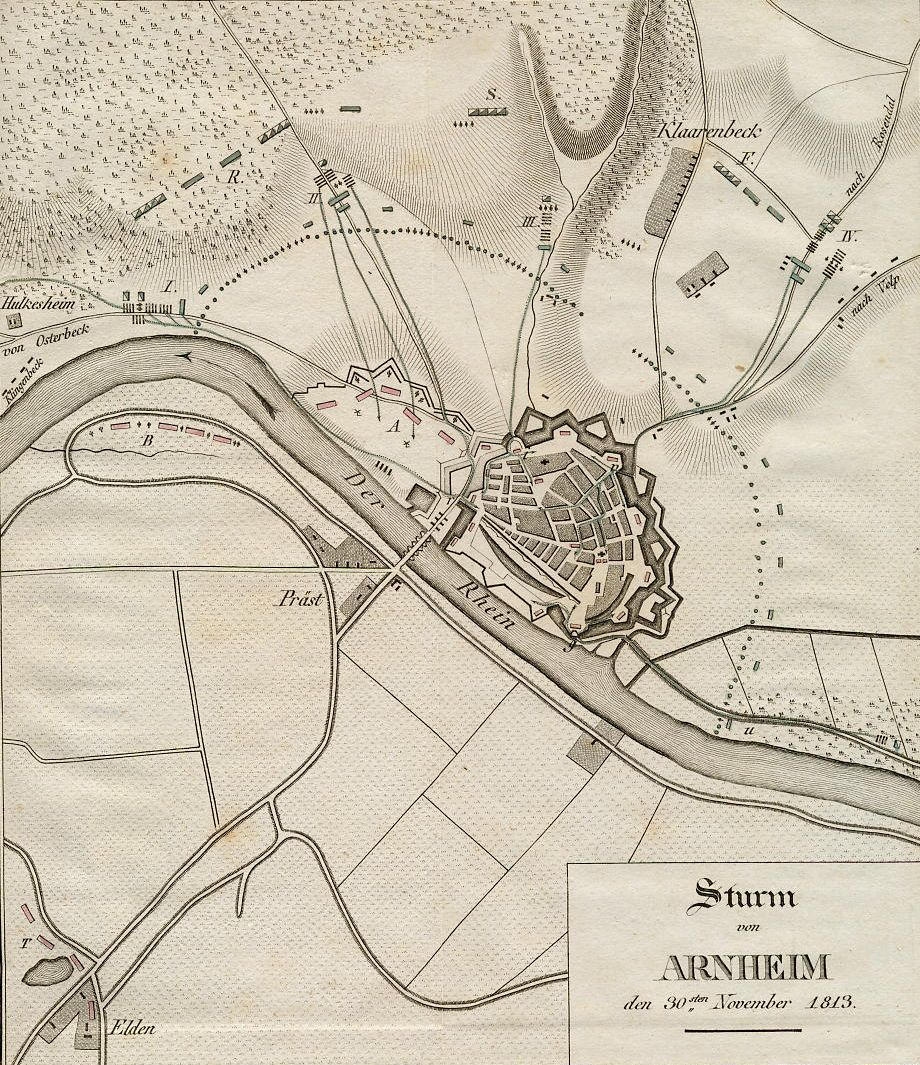
- Storm of Arnhem 30 November 1813.
Date	30 November 1813
Location	Arnhem, Yssel-Supérieur, France (present-day Netherlands) 51°59′N 5°55′E
Result	Prussian victory

Belligerents
(First French Empire) France	(Kingdom of Prussia) Prussia

Commanders and leaders
(First French Empire) Henri Charpentier	(Kingdom of Prussia) Friedrich Wilhelm von Bülow

Strength
4,000	10,000

Casualties and losses
1,500 killed, wounded, or captured 14–15 guns lost	600–700 killed, wounded, or captured
- Location within Europe

The Battle of Arnhem (30 November 1813), also known as the storming of Arnhem, saw Friedrich Wilhelm Freiherr von Bülow's Prussian corps fight an Imperial French division under Henri François Marie Charpentier at Arnhem. Attacking under the cover of fog, the Prussians broke into the city at several points and forced the French to retreat to Nijmegen after hard fighting in this War of the Sixth Coalition clash. Arnhem is a city in the Netherlands located on the Rhine River 100 kilometres (62 mi) southeast of Amsterdam.

In late November 1813, Bülow's III Prussian Corps invaded the Netherlands, sparking a Dutch rebellion against the French. Marshal Jacques MacDonald commanding the defending French XI Corps ordered Charpentier to evacuate Arnhem, but that general chose to ignore his instructions and suffered a defeat. After winning the battle, Bülow continued west in order to liberate Utrecht and support the Dutch revolt. The Prussian general's forces were soon joined by a British expedition led by Thomas Graham, 1st Baron Lynedoch. Nevertheless, friction between the Prussians and their Russian and Swedish allies resulted in a pause in the effort to liberate Holland and Belgium from the French.

== Background ==
The Coalition armies decisively defeated Emperor Napoleon at the Battle of Leipzig on 16–19 October 1813. The French emperor employed 203,133 soldiers and 738 field guns while his Coalition foes massed 361,942 men and 1,456 artillery pieces. Napoleon's forces lost 2,893 officers and 43,500 rank and file killed and wounded while 8,000 wounded, 15,000 sick and 15,000 unwounded were taken prisoner. Allied casualties numbered 1,792 officers and 51,982 men. Of Napoleon's enormous army, only 80,000 escaped west over the Saale River; the rest were dead, wounded, captured or defected to the Coalition. By the time the French emperor withdrew to the west bank of the Rhine River in November, there were only 60,000–70,000 soldiers left to defend France with approximately 100,000 more besieged in German fortresses.

The major Coalition powers were not all in agreement about what to do next. Czar Alexander I of Russia wanted to capture Paris and remove Napoleon from power though some of his generals thought they had already shed enough Russian blood. King Frederick William III of Prussia usually sided with the czar while his subjects wanted revenge against France. Emperor Francis I of Austria was wary of the overthrow of Napoleon because he feared the expansion of Russian and Prussian influence. Weary of financially supporting the Coalition, Great Britain wanted a permanent peace. The Swedish regent Jean-Baptiste Bernadotte, a former Marshal of France, was believed to be secretly plotting to secure the throne of France for himself.

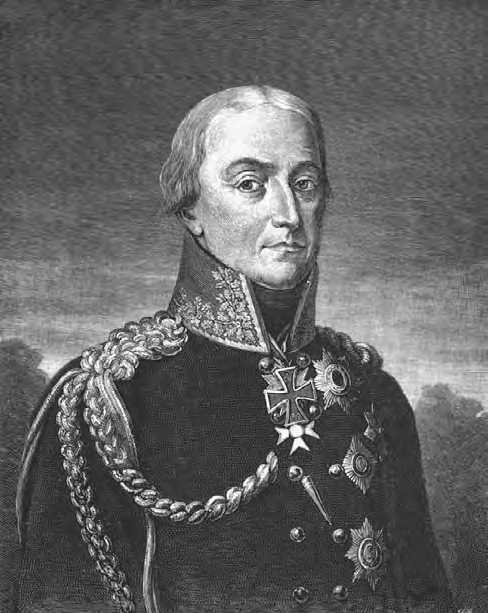
Friedrich von Bülow

Napoleon appointed his brother Louis Bonaparte to the Kingdom of Holland in May 1806. However, on 9 July 1810, the French emperor extinguished the kingdom and annexed the Netherlands to the First French Empire. The Dutch contributed only 17,300 soldiers to Napoleon's armies in 1811–1813, but their severe casualties in the French invasion of Russia shocked the population. Since their trade was badly damaged by Napoleon's Continental System, the Dutch people were ready to throw off the French yoke. In early November, Russian corps commander Ferdinand von Wintzingerode sent a 3,500-man Streifkorps led by Alexander von Benckendorff into Holland. Benckendorff's force of Don Cossacks, regular cavalry and infantry was soon joined by eight additional Cossack regiments. The Dutch rebellion first broke out in Amsterdam on 14–15 November. Depressed by the loss of his son in Russia, the French civil leader Charles-François Lebrun, duc de Plaisance responded ineffectively to the crisis. By 19 November the revolt leaders formed a provisional government until the House of Orange-Nassau could be restored to power.

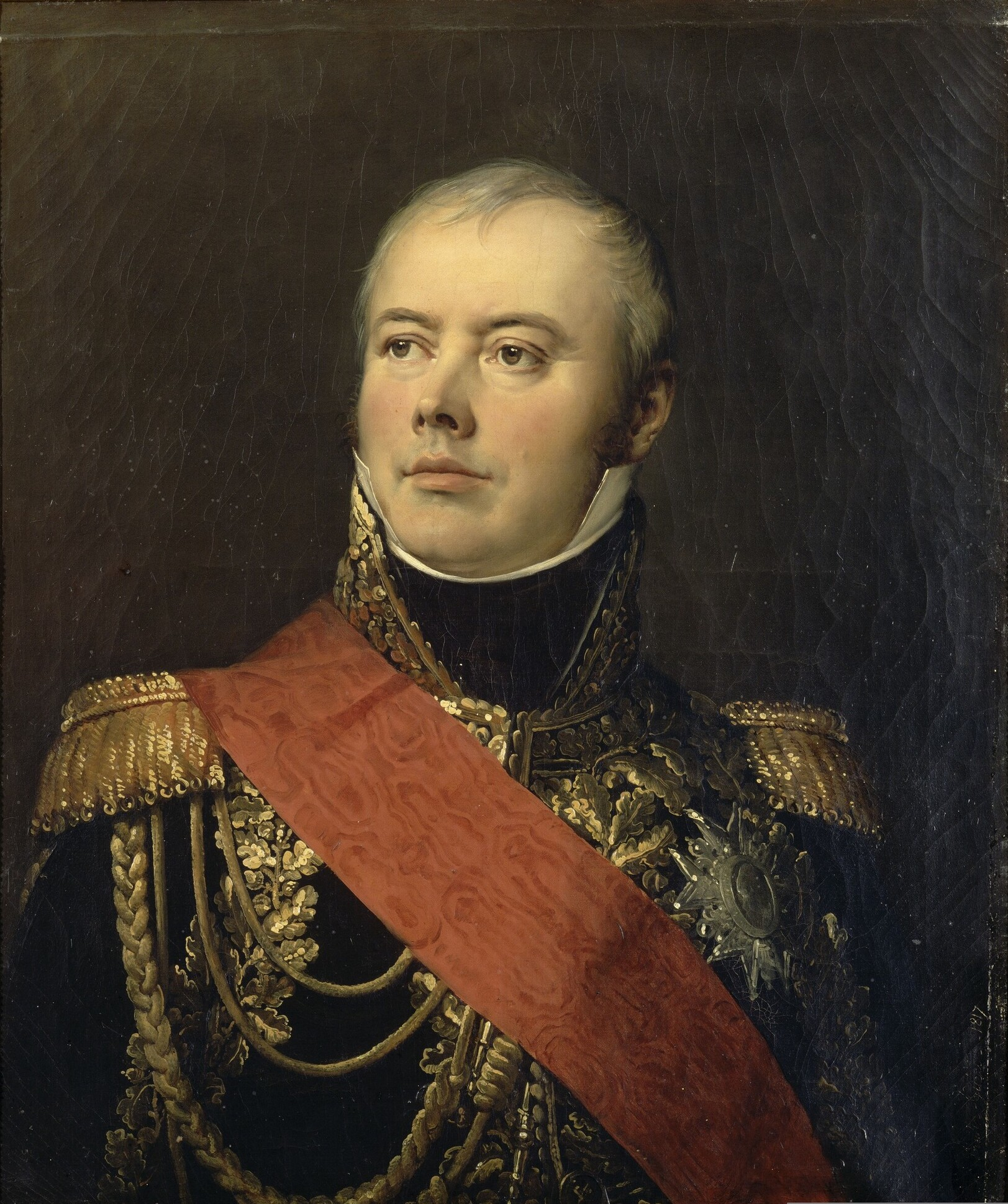
Jacques MacDonald

On 13 November Friedrich Wilhelm Freiherr von Bülow's III Prussian Corps advanced west from Minden toward the Dutch border. To defend against this threat, Marshal Jacques MacDonald deployed the XI Corps and II Cavalry Corps along the Rhine from Andernach to Wesel. To assist Gabriel Jean Joseph Molitor's weak forces in Holland, MacDonald quickly organized a 2,000-man task force under François Pierre Joseph Amey to help defend the Rhine downstream from Wesel. Macdonald began shifting his forces north to defend the lower Rhine. The French were weakened by the desertion of their foreign battalions and were compelled to form infantry and cavalry units from customs agents and mounted gendarmes. Aside from contributing the raiding forces, Wintzingerode's corps remained largely stationary in Germany.

By the end of November, MacDonald redistributed his forces into three groups. On the left wing were 10,000 troops in Henri François Marie Charpentier's 31st Division, the II Cavalry Corps and Amey's flying column. These were tasked to defend the Rhine, Meuse, Waal and IJssel Rivers. The center counted 6,000 men from Michel Sylvestre Brayer's 35th Division near Wesel while the 7,500-strong right wing consisted of the V Corps and III Cavalry Corps. Bülow's corps numbered 19,172 foot soldiers and 6,240 horsemen organized in four infantry and three cavalry brigades. The infantry contingent included the 3rd Brigade under Karl Heinrich von Zielinski, 4th Brigade led by Heinrich Ludwig August von Thümen, 5th Brigade commanded by Karl Ludwig von Borstell and 6th Brigade directed by Karl August Adolf von Krafft. Adolf Friedrich von Oppen commanded cavalry brigades led by Karl Alexander Wilhelm von Treskow, Karl Friedrich Bernhard Hellmuth von Hobe and Hans Joachim Friedrich von Sydow. Karl Friedrich von Holtzendorff directed the corps artillery, pioneers and wagon train. In round numbers, Bülow commanded 30,000 soldiers and 96 field guns.

The Army of Bohemia under Karl Philipp, Prince of Schwarzenberg did not cross the Rhine until 20 December 1813 while the Army of Silesia under Gebhard Leberecht von Blücher crossed the river on 1 January 1814 and Wintzingerode on 6 January. After Leipzig, Bernadotte took his army to north Germany intending to defeat the Kingdom of Denmark and force it to hand over Norway to Sweden. Though impatient to invade Holland, Bülow was unable to secure permission to do so until Great Britain put pressure on the Prussian government. In the meantime, Borstell's 5th Brigade was sent to blockade the fortress of Wesel. On 23 November Bülow's 3,000-man advance guard led by Oppen invaded Holland and arrived before Doesburg on the IJssel. The town had been seized by Cossacks but later recovered by Amey's task force. Oppen stormed Doesburg without much trouble, capturing 112 French soldiers. On 24 November Bülow's forces secured the surrender of Zutphen, the same day that Benckendorff's force reached Amsterdam. Also on the 24th, Oppen drove Amey's column from Velp to Arnhem in a running skirmish.

== Battle ==
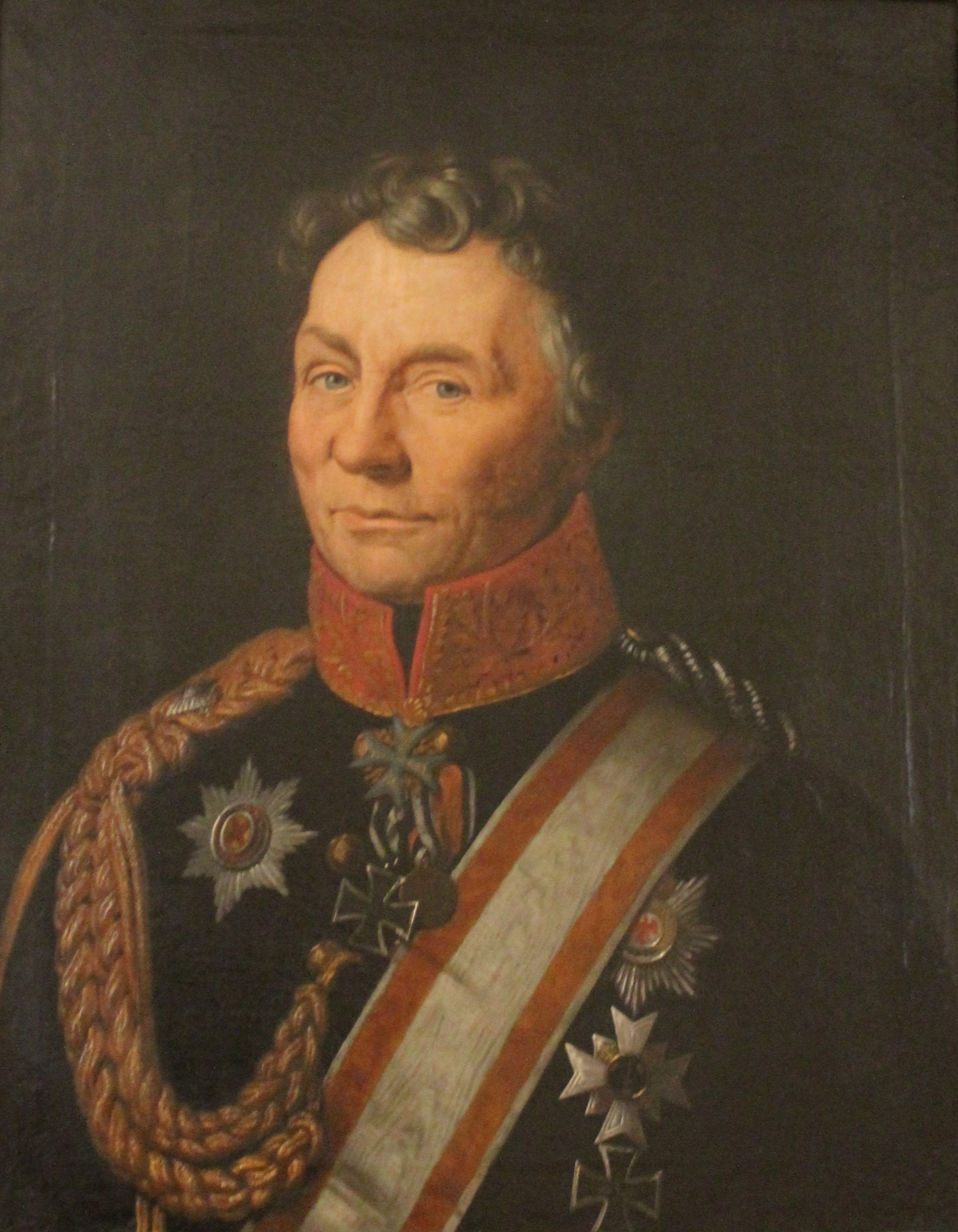
August von Thümen

After finding the French defending an entrenched camp outside Arnhem, Oppen withdrew to Velp, leaving a screen of outposts. The French attacked Oppen's pickets on 26 November, temporarily forcing them back to Velp. Later in the day, Oppen was reinforced by Sydow with three Landwehr cavalry regiments and two fusilier battalions and Friedrich August Peter von Colomb's Streifkorps. On 28 November Krafft's brigade arrived, giving Oppen 12 infantry battalions and three artillery batteries. At first the Prussian wanted to attack Arnhem, but he was dissuaded by the nearby movement of enemy troops and artillery and intelligence that 3,000–4,000 French troops defended the city. MacDonald hoped to patch together a defensive line using Molitor's troops, 3,000 French National Guards under Antoine-Guillaume Rampon at Gorinchem and the XI Corps. The French marshal and Charpentier reached Arnhem on 28 November with 2,500 men from Jean Baptiste Simon Marie's 2nd Brigade of the 31st Division plus one battalion of Auguste Julien Bigarré's 1st Brigade. MacDonald decided that Arnhem was not defensible against a numerically greater force and returned to Nijmegen, leaving Charpentier and 4,000 troops to hold the city.

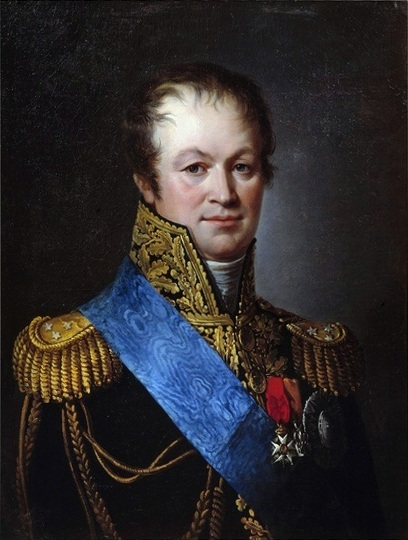
Henri Charpentier

On the morning of 29 November the French began shelling the Prussian positions from artillery pieces sited on the south bank of the Rhine. Oppen soon launched a heavy assault on the French entrenched camp, but after initial success the Prussians were driven back. Charpentier then launched a counterattack and drove Oppen's troops back to Velp. A second attack at noon overran a Prussian outpost at Lichtenbeek House, inflicting 50 casualties. Amey reinforced the French positions outside the entrenched camp. Fearing that MacDonald might launch an attack from Arnhem against his supply line, Bülow ordered Oppen to assault Arnhem the following morning. That day MacDonald returned to Arnhem and saw the size of the Prussian force. He deduced that he would soon face superior forces at Arnhem and that Charpentier was in danger of being trapped. Learning that Molitor abandoned Utrecht and realizing that holding the line of the IJssel was hopeless, MacDonald knew that there was no longer a good reason to hold Arnhem. He instructed Charpentier to withdraw his troops from the city and then returned to Nijmegen.

For unknown reasons, Charpentier defied his superior's orders and remained in Arnhem on the morning 30 November. In an even greater blunder, he failed to post sentries at the city gates. Meanwhile, Bülow arrived in the pre-dawn darkness and personally organized a five-column attack. The operation was delayed by a blanket of fog during which the Prussians heard horses and wagons crossing the Rhine bridge. Colomb's Streifkorps plus two extra battalions and two guns were to attack on the far left (east) flank. William Ernst von Zastrow led two columns on the right (west) flank under Majors Zglinitzki and Schmidt. Zglinitzki was directed to attack a large redoubt near the Rhine gate while Schmidt's command assembled at Oosterbeek and assaulted the Rhine gate. Oppen commanded the two left-center columns which were directed against the northern Jans gate and the northeastern Velp gate. After breaking through the gate, each column was ordered to divide into three sections, the first to guard the gate, the second to help outflank the adjacent gate and the third to press ahead into the city. The Leib Hussars and two Landwehr cavalry regiments were held back in order to repulse a French sortie.

As the fog lifted, Oppen gave the order for all columns to attack at 11:00 am. Shortly before this time four battalions of Thümen's brigade arrived and were used to reinforce the attacking columns. The first assault against the entrenched camp failed, but a second charge drove Marie's four battalions back into the city. Because Charpentier was unable to grasp where the Prussians were attacking, the French reaction was slow and ineffective. One Prussian column rapidly seized the Velp gate which was defended by a few soldiers. Colomb's horse artillery blew open the Sabelpoort gate while the Jans gate also fell quickly. The three Prussian eastern columns burst into the city and rushed one of the two inner gates. These easy seizures were the result of Charpentier concentrating most of his troops on the western side of the city.

Led by a battalion of the Kolberg Regiment, Zglinitzki's column stormed the redoubt while Schmidt's men scaled the city wall despite being enfiladed by canister shot from cannons sited on the south bank of the river. The Prussians prevailed in a terrific melee in which Marie was bayoneted three times and became a prisoner. Semiconscious from a wound, Charpentier barely escaped a similar fate. Amey assumed command of four battalions and led them in retreat across the river. Three French battalions became trapped within the city, and expecting no quarter, they put up a bitter fight in the city streets. Some got away but most were killed or captured. The French managed to set the bridge on fire but the Prussian pioneers put out the blaze and made repairs.

== Results ==
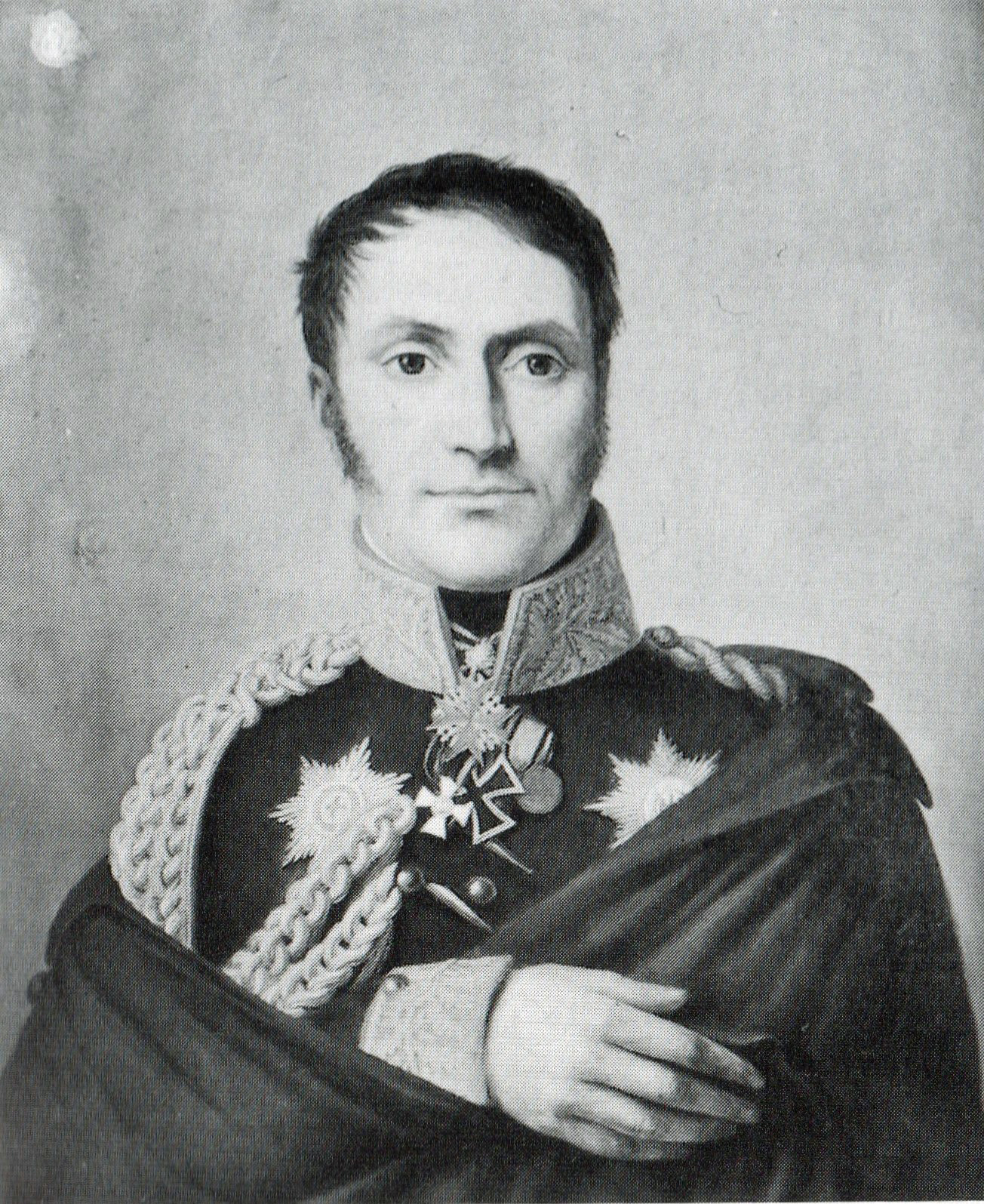
Ludwig von Borstell

Digby Smith stated that the French lost 500 killed and wounded plus 1,000 men and 14 guns captured out of a total of 4,000. The Prussians sustained losses of 600 killed and wounded out of 10,000 troops engaged. Charpentier's division included the 22nd Light and the 22nd, 51st, 55th, 102nd, 112th and 123rd Line Infantry Regiments. Michael V. Leggiere asserted that the Prussians inflicted losses of 700 killed and wounded while capturing 1,024 French soldiers and 15 guns. Two battalions of the 112th Line were virtually wiped out with only 78 men escaping. Leggiere also reported the total French loss as "almost 1,500". The Prussians were disorganized by their triumph and suffered about 700 casualties. Thümen's brigade reported losses of 245 officers and men. The badly injured Charpentier was replaced in command of the 31st Division by Brayer while Jean Raymond Charles Bourke took over the 35th Division.

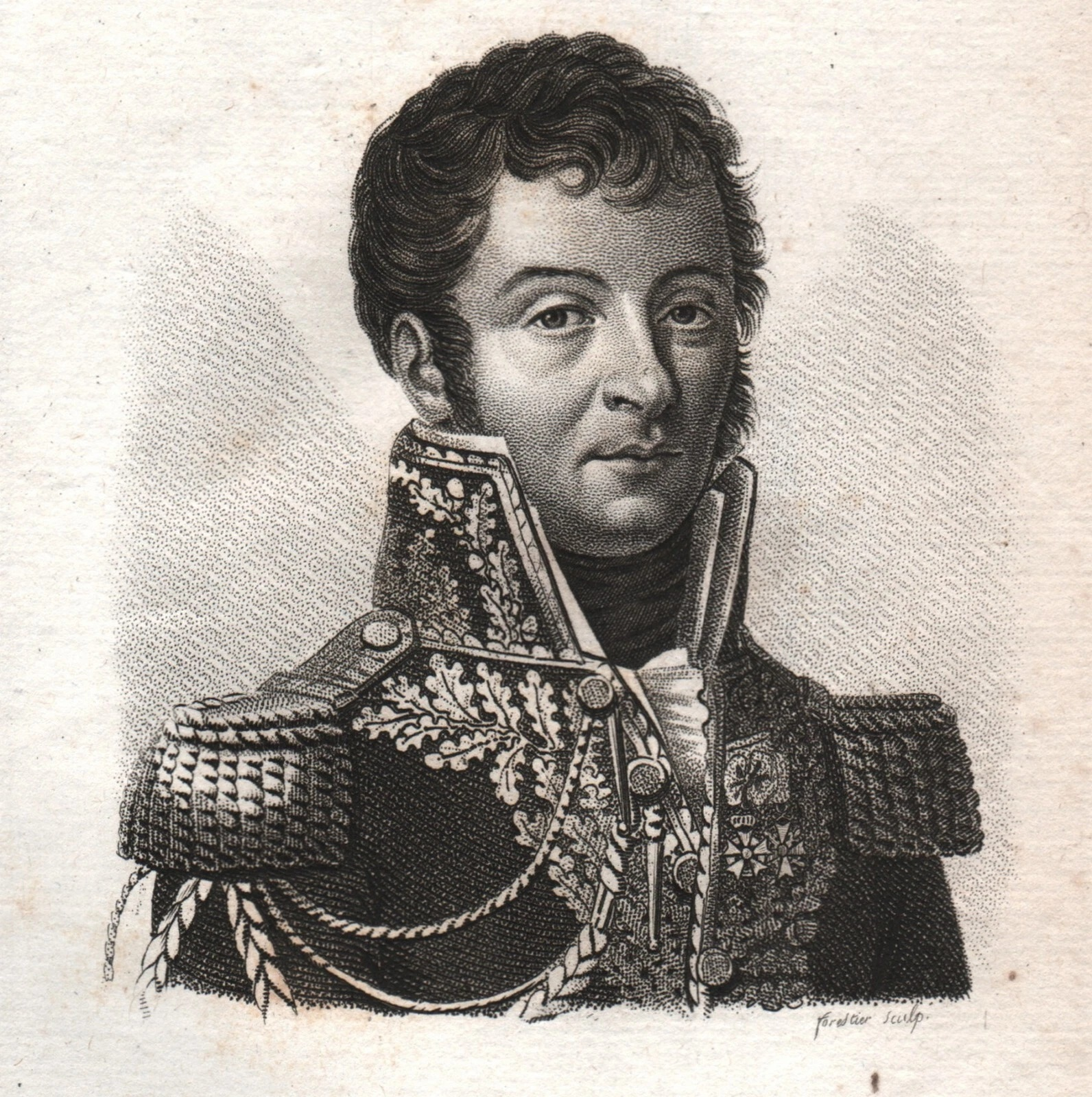
Bigarré

As soon as the bridge was usable, Bülow sent Oppen with three cavalry regiments and a horse artillery battery after the French. Amey's retreating soldiers met Bigarré's 1st Brigade at Elst where Oppen's troopers found French infantry in position behind the Linge River and the pursuit ended. MacDonald fell back and redeployed his troops to hold the line of the Waal. Bülow moved west to Utrecht which he occupied on 2 December and paused to consider his next move. Two days later an 8,000-strong British expedition under Thomas Graham, 1st Baron Lynedoch landed in the Netherlands. To his annoyance, Bülow found the newly liberated Dutch people unwilling to volunteer for military service. A cache of 25,000 British muskets intended to arm the Dutch were used to equip the Westphalian Landwehr instead.

Bülow was also disappointed with Wintzingerode whose 18,000 soldiers remained completely inert in Germany. Because Bernadotte appropriated some of his units, Wintzingerode stubbornly refused to support the invasion of Holland, even recalling some of Benckendorff's Cossacks. The duplicitous Bernadotte did not help the situation by issuing ambiguous and conflicting orders. Bülow wished to use Borstell's troops for field operations, but until Wintzingerode's Russians finally arrived at the end of December, the 5th Prussian Brigade was tied to the blockade of Wesel.

== Forces ==
=== Prussian III Corps ===
Nov. 1813–Jan. 1814 organization
Corps	Division	Brigade	Units
III Corps: Friedrich Wilhelm von Bülow; 19,172 infantry 6,240 cavalry	Division: None	3rd Brigade: Karl Heinrich von Zielinski	2nd East Prussian Grenadier Battalion
III Corps: Friedrich Wilhelm von Bülow; 19,172 infantry 6,240 cavalry	Division: None	3rd Brigade: Karl Heinrich von Zielinski	3rd East Prussian Infantry Regiment
III Corps: Friedrich Wilhelm von Bülow; 19,172 infantry 6,240 cavalry	Division: None	3rd Brigade: Karl Heinrich von Zielinski	4th Reserve Infantry Regiment
III Corps: Friedrich Wilhelm von Bülow; 19,172 infantry 6,240 cavalry	Division: None	3rd Brigade: Karl Heinrich von Zielinski	3rd East Prussian Landwehr Regiment
III Corps: Friedrich Wilhelm von Bülow; 19,172 infantry 6,240 cavalry	Division: None	3rd Brigade: Karl Heinrich von Zielinski	1st Leib Hussar Regiment
III Corps: Friedrich Wilhelm von Bülow; 19,172 infantry 6,240 cavalry	Division: None	3rd Brigade: Karl Heinrich von Zielinski	6-pounder Foot Battery Nr. 6
III Corps: Friedrich Wilhelm von Bülow; 19,172 infantry 6,240 cavalry	Division: None	4th Brigade: Heinrich Ludwig August von Thümen	East Prussian Jäger Battalion (2 companies)
III Corps: Friedrich Wilhelm von Bülow; 19,172 infantry 6,240 cavalry	Division: None	4th Brigade: Heinrich Ludwig August von Thümen	4th East Prussian Infantry Regiment
III Corps: Friedrich Wilhelm von Bülow; 19,172 infantry 6,240 cavalry	Division: None	4th Brigade: Heinrich Ludwig August von Thümen	5th Reserve Infantry Regiment
III Corps: Friedrich Wilhelm von Bülow; 19,172 infantry 6,240 cavalry	Division: None	4th Brigade: Heinrich Ludwig August von Thümen	2nd Pommeranian Landwehr Regiment
III Corps: Friedrich Wilhelm von Bülow; 19,172 infantry 6,240 cavalry	Division: None	4th Brigade: Heinrich Ludwig August von Thümen	1st Pommeranian Landwehr Cavalry Regiment
III Corps: Friedrich Wilhelm von Bülow; 19,172 infantry 6,240 cavalry	Division: None	4th Brigade: Heinrich Ludwig August von Thümen	6-pounder Foot Battery Nr. 8
III Corps: Friedrich Wilhelm von Bülow; 19,172 infantry 6,240 cavalry	Division: None	5th Brigade: Karl Heinrich Ludwig von Borstell	Pommeranian Grenadier Battalion
III Corps: Friedrich Wilhelm von Bülow; 19,172 infantry 6,240 cavalry	Division: None	5th Brigade: Karl Heinrich Ludwig von Borstell	1st Pommeranian Infantry Regiment
III Corps: Friedrich Wilhelm von Bülow; 19,172 infantry 6,240 cavalry	Division: None	5th Brigade: Karl Heinrich Ludwig von Borstell	2nd Reserve Infantry Regiment
III Corps: Friedrich Wilhelm von Bülow; 19,172 infantry 6,240 cavalry	Division: None	5th Brigade: Karl Heinrich Ludwig von Borstell	Elbe Infantry Regiment
III Corps: Friedrich Wilhelm von Bülow; 19,172 infantry 6,240 cavalry	Division: None	5th Brigade: Karl Heinrich Ludwig von Borstell	2nd Kurmärk Landwehr Regiment
III Corps: Friedrich Wilhelm von Bülow; 19,172 infantry 6,240 cavalry	Division: None	5th Brigade: Karl Heinrich Ludwig von Borstell	Pommeranian Hussar Regiment
III Corps: Friedrich Wilhelm von Bülow; 19,172 infantry 6,240 cavalry	Division: None	5th Brigade: Karl Heinrich Ludwig von Borstell	6-pounder Foot Battery Nr. 10
III Corps: Friedrich Wilhelm von Bülow; 19,172 infantry 6,240 cavalry	Division: None	6th Brigade: Karl August Adolf von Krafft	Kolberg Infantry Regiment
III Corps: Friedrich Wilhelm von Bülow; 19,172 infantry 6,240 cavalry	Division: None	6th Brigade: Karl August Adolf von Krafft	9th Reserve Infantry Regiment
III Corps: Friedrich Wilhelm von Bülow; 19,172 infantry 6,240 cavalry	Division: None	6th Brigade: Karl August Adolf von Krafft	1st Neumärk Landwehr Regiment
III Corps: Friedrich Wilhelm von Bülow; 19,172 infantry 6,240 cavalry	Division: None	6th Brigade: Karl August Adolf von Krafft	2nd Pommeranian Landwehr Cavalry Regiment
III Corps: Friedrich Wilhelm von Bülow; 19,172 infantry 6,240 cavalry	Division: None	6th Brigade: Karl August Adolf von Krafft	6-pounder Foot Battery Nr. 16
III Corps: Friedrich Wilhelm von Bülow; 19,172 infantry 6,240 cavalry	Division: Adolph Friedrich von Oppen	Cavalry Brigade: Karl Alexander Wilhelm von Treskow	Queen's Dragoon Regiment
III Corps: Friedrich Wilhelm von Bülow; 19,172 infantry 6,240 cavalry	Division: Adolph Friedrich von Oppen	Cavalry Brigade: Karl Alexander Wilhelm von Treskow	Brandenberg Dragoon Regiment
III Corps: Friedrich Wilhelm von Bülow; 19,172 infantry 6,240 cavalry	Division: Adolph Friedrich von Oppen	Cavalry Brigade: Karl Alexander Wilhelm von Treskow	2nd West Prussian Dragoon Regiment
III Corps: Friedrich Wilhelm von Bülow; 19,172 infantry 6,240 cavalry	Division: Adolph Friedrich von Oppen	Cavalry Brigade: Karl Alexander Wilhelm von Treskow	6-pounder Horse Battery Nr. 5
III Corps: Friedrich Wilhelm von Bülow; 19,172 infantry 6,240 cavalry	Division: Adolph Friedrich von Oppen	Cavalry Brigade: Karl Bernhard Hellmuth von Hobe	Westphalian Uhlan Regiment
III Corps: Friedrich Wilhelm von Bülow; 19,172 infantry 6,240 cavalry	Division: Adolph Friedrich von Oppen	Cavalry Brigade: Karl Bernhard Hellmuth von Hobe	2nd Silesian Hussar Regiment
III Corps: Friedrich Wilhelm von Bülow; 19,172 infantry 6,240 cavalry	Division: Adolph Friedrich von Oppen	Cavalry Brigade: Karl Bernhard Hellmuth von Hobe	Pommeranian National Cavalry Regiment
III Corps: Friedrich Wilhelm von Bülow; 19,172 infantry 6,240 cavalry	Division: Adolph Friedrich von Oppen	Cavalry Brigade: Karl Bernhard Hellmuth von Hobe	6-pounder Horse Battery Nr. 6
III Corps: Friedrich Wilhelm von Bülow; 19,172 infantry 6,240 cavalry	Division: Adolph Friedrich von Oppen	Cavalry Brigade: Hans Joachim Friedrich von Sydow	2nd Kurmärk Landwehr Cavalry Regiment
III Corps: Friedrich Wilhelm von Bülow; 19,172 infantry 6,240 cavalry	Division: Adolph Friedrich von Oppen	Cavalry Brigade: Hans Joachim Friedrich von Sydow	4th Kurmärk Landwehr Cavalry Regiment
III Corps: Friedrich Wilhelm von Bülow; 19,172 infantry 6,240 cavalry	Division: None	Corps Artillery: Karl Friedrich von Holtzendorff	12-pounder Foot Batteries Nrs. 4 and 5
III Corps: Friedrich Wilhelm von Bülow; 19,172 infantry 6,240 cavalry	Division: None	Corps Artillery: Karl Friedrich von Holtzendorff	6-pounder Foot Batteries Nrs. 19 and ?
III Corps: Friedrich Wilhelm von Bülow; 19,172 infantry 6,240 cavalry	Division: None	Corps Artillery: Karl Friedrich von Holtzendorff	6-pounder Horse Battery Nr. 11
III Corps: Friedrich Wilhelm von Bülow; 19,172 infantry 6,240 cavalry	Division: None	Corps Artillery: Karl Friedrich von Holtzendorff	Park Columns Nrs. 3, 4 and 6
III Corps: Friedrich Wilhelm von Bülow; 19,172 infantry 6,240 cavalry	Division: None	Corps Artillery: Karl Friedrich von Holtzendorff	Pioneer Companies Nrs. 4 and 5
