= Napoleonland =

Proposed French theme park

Napoleonland was the nickname given by news media to a French theme park, Napoleon's Bivouac, proposed by French politician Yves Jégo in 2012. The park's theme was to be Napoleon Bonaparte, the French general and emperor who rose to power in the aftermath of the French Revolution. Proposed attractions included lessons in Napoleon's life from his time as an artillery officer to his eventual defeat at the Battle of Waterloo. A watershow would depict the Battle of Trafalgar, other historical re-enactments and a ski run featuring replicated frozen bodies of French soldiers in a recreation of Napoleon's retreat from Russia. The park would be built by 2017 near Montereau-Fault-Yonne, site of the Battle of Montereau, where proposer Jégo was the local mayor, at an estimated cost of €200 million.

In 2017 Jégo made a new proposal for a Park Napoléon to be built in Marolles-sur-Seine near to Montereau where he is mayor, with an estimated completion date of 2023. By 2020 it had still failed to find an investor, and conservation groups were objecting to the location of its planned construction site.
