= VII Corps (Grande Armée) =

- Active: 1805–1807; 1812–1813; 1814
- Country: First French Empire
- Branch: French Imperial Army
- Size: Corps
- Engagements: War of the Third Coalition; War of the Fourth Coalition; War of the Fifth Coalition; War of the Sixth Coalition

Commanders
- Notable commanders: Pierre Augereau; François Joseph Lefebvre; Nicolas Oudinot; Jean Reynier; Laurent Gouvion Saint-Cyr

The VII Corps of the Grande Armée was a French military unit that existed during the Napoleonic Wars. It was formed in 1805 and assigned to Marshal Pierre Augereau. From 1805 to 1807, Augereau led the VII Corps in the War of the Third Coalition and the War of the Fourth Coalition. It was disbanded after being nearly wiped out at the Battle of Eylau in February 1807 and its surviving troops were distributed to other corps.

In 1812, a new VII Corps composed of soldiers from Saxony was created for the invasion of Russia and General Jean Reynier took command. This formation survived to fight during the War of the Sixth Coalition, but ceased to exist after the Battle of Leipzig in October 1813 due to the defection of the Saxons. The VII Corps was recreated during the 1814 campaign in France and assigned to Marshal Nicolas Oudinot. The formation consisted of one Young Guard division and two regular divisions of Peninsular War veterans.

== Order of battle ==
=== October 1806 ===
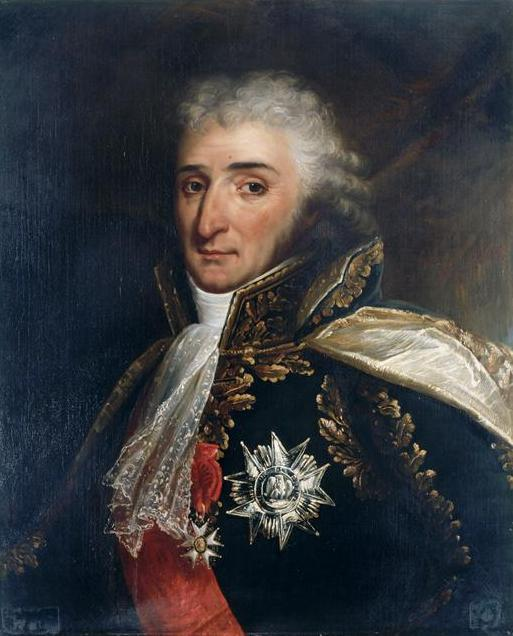
Pierre Augereau

Marshal Pierre Augereau (17,672, 36 guns)

- Chief of Staff: General of Brigade Claude Marie Joseph Pannetier
- 1st Division: General of Division Jacques Desjardin (8,242, 8 guns)
  - Brigade: General of Brigade Pierre Belon Lapisse
    - 16th Light Infantry Regiment, 1st, 2nd, 3rd, and 4th battalions
  - Brigade: General of Brigade Jacques Lefranc
    - 14th Light Infantry Regiment, 2nd battalion
    - 44th Line Infantry Regiment, 1st, 2nd, and 3rd battalions
    - 105th Line Infantry Regiment, 1st, 2nd, and 3rd battalions
  - Artillery: Two 12-pound guns, four 6-pound guns, two 6-inch howitzers
    - 3rd Foot Artillery Regiment, 4th company
    - 6th Horse Artillery Regiment, 2nd company (-)
- 2nd Division: General of Division Étienne Heudelet de Bierre
  - Brigade: General of Brigade François Pierre Joseph Amey
    - 7th Light Infantry Regiment, 1st, 2nd, and 3rd battalions
    - Hesse-Darmstadt Guard Fusilier Battalion
    - Hesse-Darmstadt 1st Life Fusilier Battalion
  - Brigade: General of Brigade Jacques Thomas Sarrut
    - 24th Line Infantry Regiment, 1st, 2nd, and 3rd battalions
    - 63rd Line Infantry Regiment, 1st and 2nd battalions
  - Brigade: unknown
    - Nassau Infantry Regiment, 3rd battalion
  - Artillery: Two 12-pound guns, four 6-pound guns, two 6-inch howitzers
    - 3rd Foot Artillery Regiment, 3rd company
    - 6th Horse Artillery Regiment, 2nd company (-)
- Cavalry Brigade: General of Brigade Antoine Jean Auguste Durosnel (1,290, 4 guns)
  - 7th Chasseurs-à-Cheval Regiment, 1st, 2nd, 3rd, and 4th squadrons
  - 20th Chasseurs-à-Cheval Regiment, 1st, 2nd, and 3rd squadrons
  - 6th Horse Artillery Regiment, 5th company, four 4-pound guns
- Corps Artillery: unknown commander (1,323 gunners and train)
  - Four 12-pound guns, 12 8-pound guns, four 4-pound guns, four 6-inch howitzers
  - 1st Foot Artillery Regiment, 9th, 10th, 11th, and 12th companies
  - 2nd Horse Artillery Regiment, 1st and 5th companies

=== April 1809 ===
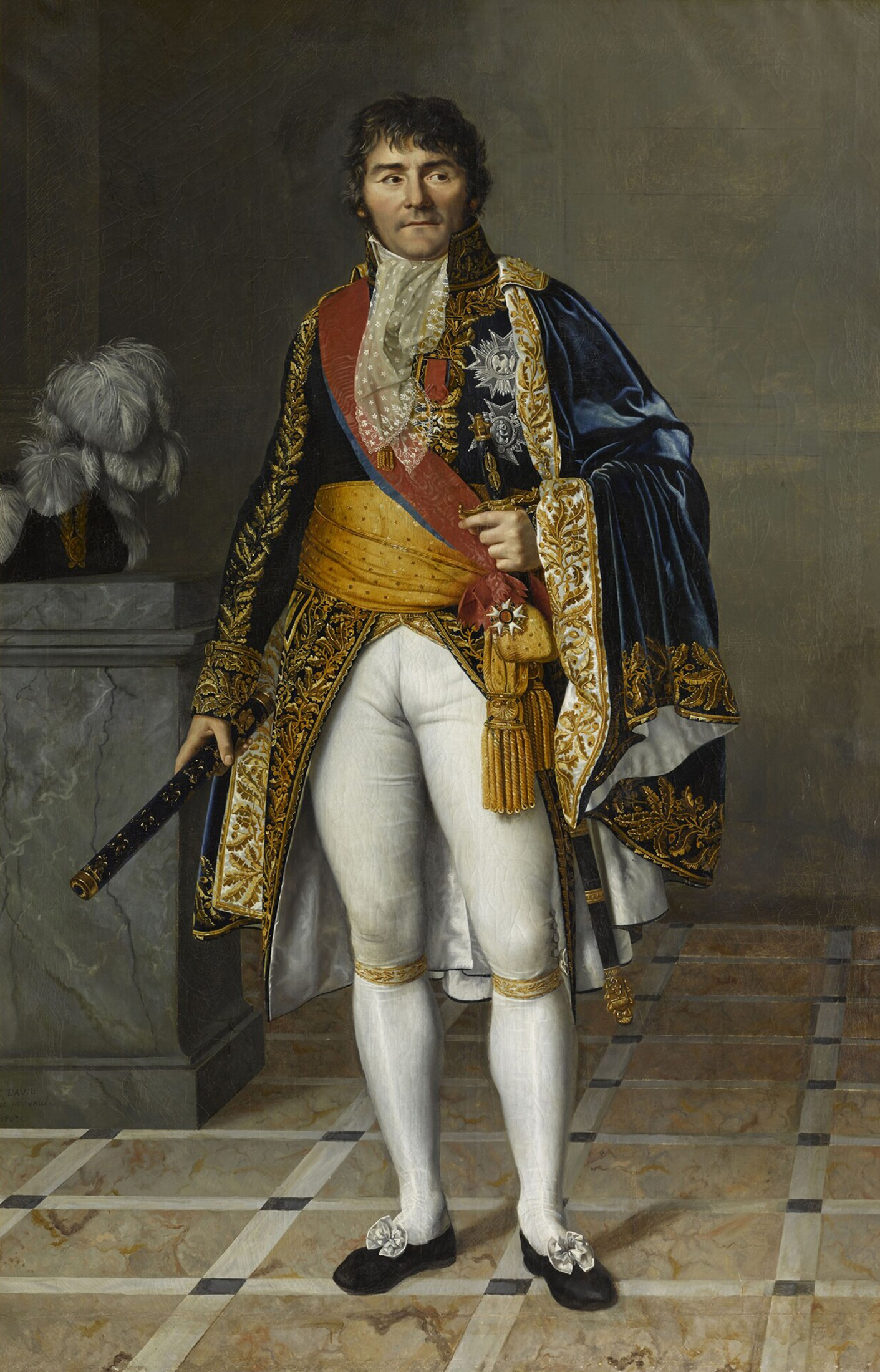
François Lefebvre

Marshal François Joseph Lefebvre

- Artillery Reserve: Colonel Calonge
  - Three 12-pound position batteries, 18 guns
- 1st Bavarian Division: General-Leutnant Crown Prince Ludwig of Bavaria
  - Brigade: General-Major Rechberg
    - 1st Habermann Light Battalion
    - Leib Regiment (2 battalions)
    - 2nd Prince Royal Regiment (2 battalions)
  - Brigade: General-Major Stengel
    - 4th Salern Regiment (2 battalions)
    - 8th Duc Pius Regiment (2 battalions)
  - Cavalry Brigade: General-Major Zandt
    - Minuzzi Dragoon Regiment (2 squadrons)
    - Prince Royal Chevau-léger Regiment (4 squadrons)
  - Artillery: Two 6-pound foot batteries, 6-pound horse battery, 18 guns
- 2nd Bavarian Division: General-Leutnant Karl Philipp von Wrede
  - Brigade: General-Major Minuzzi
    - 6th Laroche Light Battalion
    - 3rd Prince Karl Regiment (2 battalions)
    - 13th Regiment (2 battalions)
  - Brigade: General-Major Beckers
    - 6th Duc Wilhelm Regiment (2 battalions)
    - 7th Löwenstein Regiment (2 battalions)
  - Cavalry Brigade: General-Major Preysing
    - König Chevau-léger Regiment (4 squadrons)
    - Leiningen Chevau-léger Regiment (4 squadrons)
  - Artillery: Two 6-pound foot batteries, 6-pound horse battery, 18 guns
- 3rd Bavarian Division: General-Leutnant Bernhard Erasmus von Deroy
  - Brigade: General-Major Siebein
    - 5th Buttler Light Battalion
    - 9th Isenburg Regiment (2 battalions)
    - 10th Juncker Regiment (2 battalions)
  - Brigade: General-Major Vincenti
    - 7th Günter Light Battalion
    - 5th Regiment (2 battalions)
    - 14th Preysing Regiment (2 battalions)
  - Cavalry Brigade: General-Major Seydewitz
    - Taxis Dragoon Regiment (4 squadrons)
    - Bubenhoven Chevau-léger Regiment (4 squadrons)
  - Artillery: Two 6-pound foot batteries, 6-pound horse battery, 18 guns

=== August 1812 ===
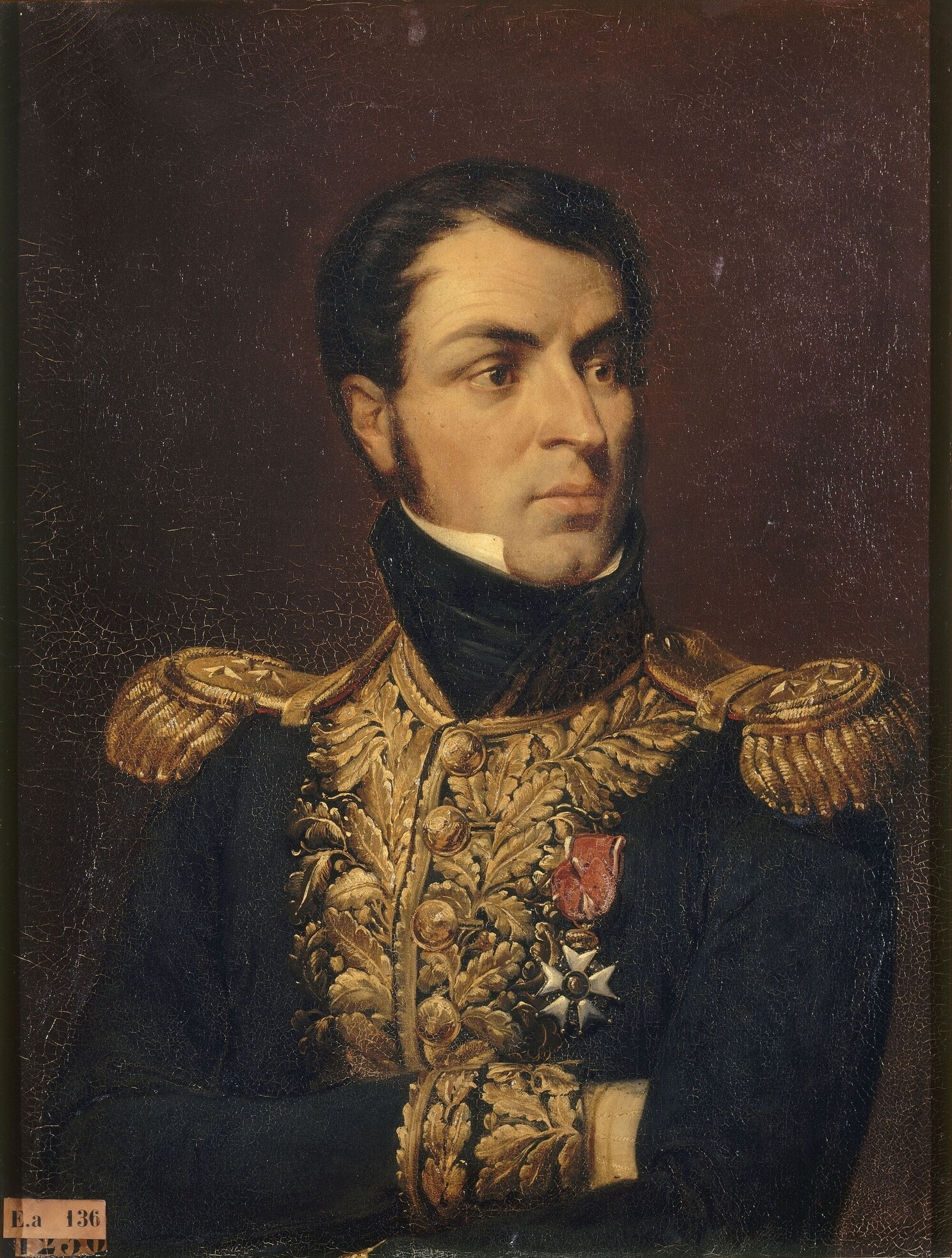
Jean Reynier

General of Division Jean Reynier (15,008 infantry in 18 battalions, 2,186 cavalry in 16 squadrons)

- Artillery: 50 guns
- 21st Division (Saxon): General-Leutnant Karl Christian Erdmann von Le Coq
  - 1st Brigade: General-Major von Steindel
    - Liebenau Grenadier Battalion (1 battalion)
    - Prinz Friedrich Infantry Regiment (2 battalions)
    - Prinz Clemens Infantry Regiment (2 battalions)
  - 2nd Brigade: General-Major von Nostitz
    - Prinz Anton Infantry Regiment (2 battalions)
    - 1st Light Infantry Regiment (2 battalions)
  - Cavalry Brigade: General-Major von Gablenz
    - Prinz Clemens Uhlan Regiment (4 squadrons)
    - Polenz Chevau-léger Regiment (4 squadrons)
- 22nd Division (Saxon): General-Leutnant von Funck
  - 2nd Brigade: General-Major von Sahr
    - Anger Grenadier Battalion (1 battalion)
    - Spiegel Grenadier Battalion (1 battalion)
    - 2nd Light Infantry Regiment (2 battalions)
  - 1st(?) Brigade: General-Major von Klengel
    - König Infantry Regiment (2 battalions)
    - Niesemeuschel Infantry Regiment (1 and a half battalions)
- 32nd Division (French): General of Division Pierre François Joseph Durutte
  - 35th Line Infantry Regiment (2 battalions)
  - 131st Line Infantry Regiment (3 battalions)
  - 132nd Line Infantry Regiment (3 battalions)
  - 133rd Line Infantry Regiment (1 battalion)
  - Belle-Isle Infantry Regiment (3 battalions)
  - Würzburg Infantry Regiment (3 battalions)

=== October 1813 ===
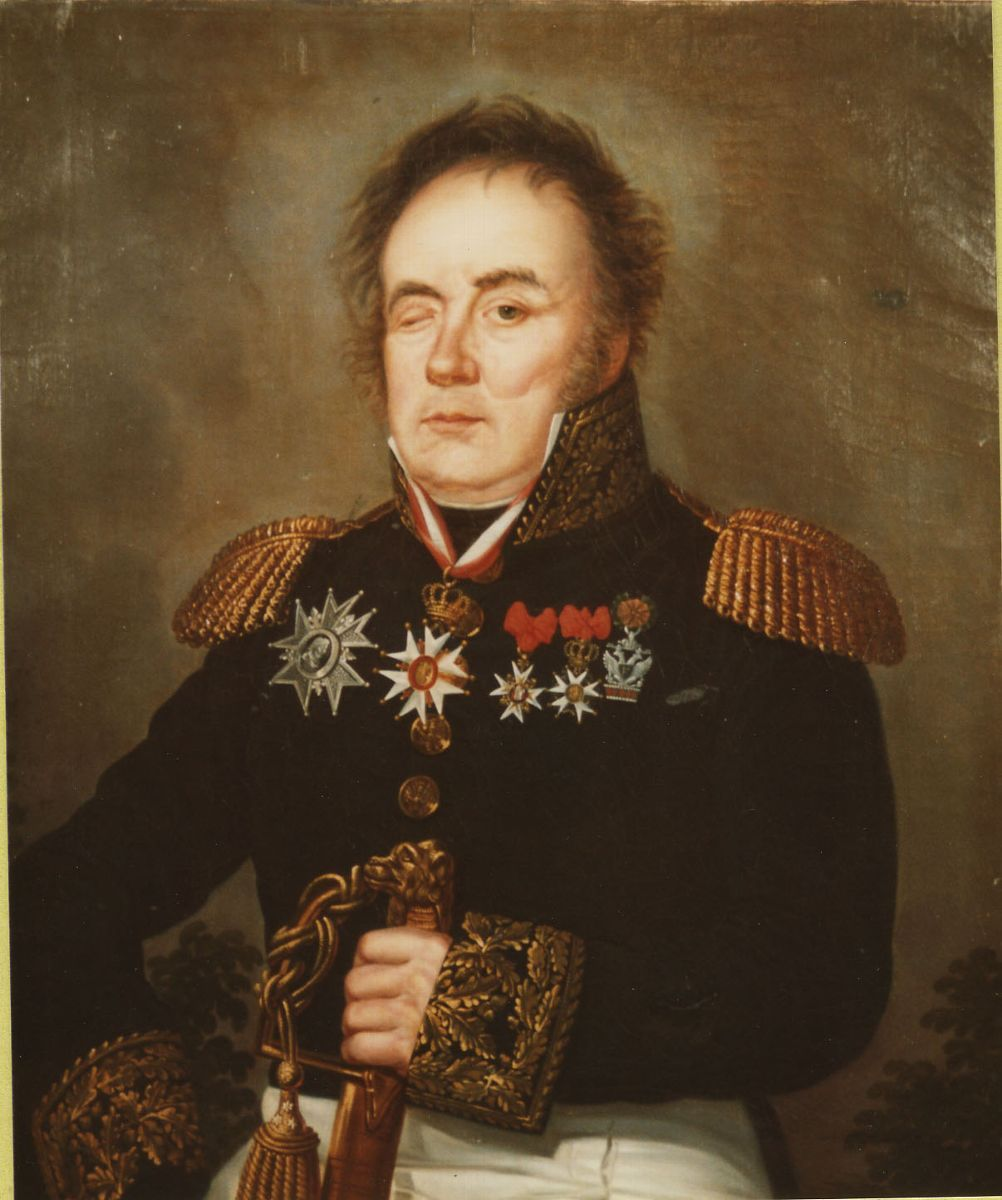
Pierre Durutte

General of Division Jean Reynier (12,837, 48 guns)

- Corps Artillery:
  - One Saxon foot artillery battery (6 12-pound guns)
  - One French foot artillery battery (6 12-pound guns)
  - One Saxon horse artillery battery (4 guns)
- 13th Division (French): General of Division Armand Charles Guilleminot
  - Brigade: General of Brigade Antoine Gruyer
    - 1st Light Infantry Regiment (4 battalions)
    - 18th Light Infantry Regiment (1st and 2nd Battalions)
    - 7th Line Infantry Regiment (3rd Battalion)
    - 156th Line Infantry Regiment (1st and 2nd Battalions)
  - Brigade: General of Brigade Louis-Francois, Baron Lejeune
    - 52nd Line Infantry Regiment (3rd Battalion)
    - 67th Line Infantry Regiment (3rd Battalion)
    - 101st Line Infantry Regiment (2nd and 3rd Battalions)
    - Illyrian Infantry Regiment (2nd Battalion)
  - Artillery: One foot artillery battery (6 guns)
- 24th (Saxon) Division: General-Leutnant von Zeschau
  - 1st Brigade: Oberst von Brause
    - Lecoq Light Infantry Regiment (1 battalion)
    - Spiegel Grenadier Battalion Nr. 1 (1 battalion)
    - Prinz Friedrich August Line Infantry Regiment (1 battalion)
    - Rechten Line Infantry Regiment (1 battalion)
    - Steindel Line Infantry Regiment (1 battalion)
  - 2nd Brigade: General-Major von Ryssel
    - Sahr Light Infantry Regiment (1 battalion)
    - Anger Grenadier Battalion Nr. 2 (1 battalion)
    - Niesemueschel Line Infantry Regiment (1 battalion)
    - Prinz Anton Line Infantry Regiment (1 battalion)
    - Feldjager company
  - Artillery: Two foot artillery batteries (16 guns)
- 32nd Division (French): General of Division Pierre François Joseph Durutte
  - Brigade: General of Brigade Marie Jean Baptiste Urbain Devaux
    - 35th Light Infantry Regiment (1st Battalion)
    - 131st Line Infantry Regiment (3rd Battalion)
    - 132nd Line Infantry Regiment (3rd Battalion)
  - Brigade: General of Brigade Antoine Anatole Gedeon Jarry
    - 36th Light Infantry Regiment (4th Battalion)
    - 133rd Line Infantry Regiment (3rd Battalion)
    - Würzburg Infantry Regiment (3rd Battalion)
  - Artillery:
    - One foot artillery battery (6 guns)
    - One horse artillery battery (6 guns)
- 27th (Saxon) Light Cavalry Brigade: Oberst von Lindenau
  - Hussar Regiment (8 squadrons)
  - Prinz Clemens Uhlan Regiment (5 squadrons)
  - One horse artillery battery (4 guns)
