= Hans Joachim Friedrich von Sydow =

Lieutenant General Hans Joachim Friedrich von Sydow (13 May 1762 in Zernikow / Nordwestuckermark – 27 April 1823) was a Prussian cavalry officer who fought in the Napoleonic Wars. He was honoured with a knighthood and the Blue Max (Pour le Mérite). He fought with distinction at Waterloo.

== Early life and military service ==
Sydow was born on 12 May 1762 in Zernikow, a town that likely has changed names or does not exist anymore, between Neustrelitz and Oranienburg, Westprignitz, a Prussian district in Brandenburg. Westprignitz also no longer exists, and was an amalgamation of the districts of Lenzen, Plattenburg, most of Perleberg, and a part of Havelberg.

Sydow's father was Georg Friedrich von Sydow, a retired officer, and lord of Zernikow. Sydow's mother was Beate Louise von Sydow née Holtzendorf.

It may have been due to his father's wishes and/or inspiration that Sydow joined the cavalry, or he may have emulated many other minor nobles, and joined to start a career. In 1775 he entered the army as a private in the 8th Hussar Regiment (von Belling), and was commissioned as an ensign (modern equivalent of a 2nd lieutenant) on 31 March 1778. He fought in the War of Bavarian Succession from 1778 to 1779 and at the battles of Zwickau and Gabel. He ranked up twice more between 1783 and 1792.

== Napoleonic Wars ==
On 20 April 1792 France declared war on Austria, which had allied with Prussia in February, thus bringing Prussia into The War of the First Coalition.

Sydow fought at the Battles of Edesheim, Deidesheim, and Kurrweiler. He participated in the Siege of Landau and the Battle of Kaiserslautern, where he was wounded and awarded his Pour le Mérite.

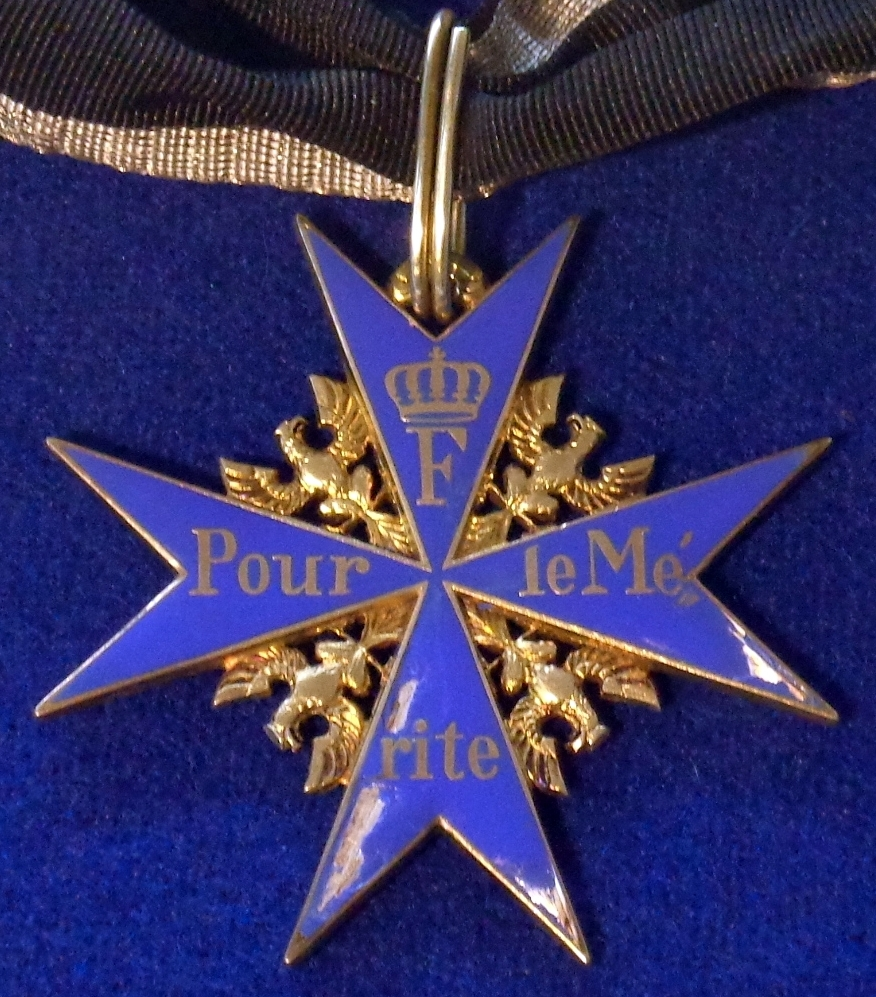
Pour le Mérite

On 29 April 1794 Sydow was promoted to Stabsmeister/Stabskapitan (Staff Captain). In 1795, Prussia signed the Peace of Basel and ended their involvement in the War of the First Coalition. Sydow continued his service in the cavalry, being promoted to Rittmeister (Cavalry Captain) on 4 January 1797. On 15 June 1800, he accepted a commission as major in the 8th Hussar Regiment, Hussars von Blücher.

In the War of the Fourth Coalition, Sydow was wounded at the Battle of Auerstedt and later fought at the Battle of Lychen. On 7 November 1806 Blücher surrendered an army of 10,000 soldiers to Napoleon at Ratekau, with Sydow being in the ranks that were given up.
