= Karl Alexander Wilhelm von Treskow =

Major-General Karl Alexander Wilhelm von Treskow (5 June 1764, Eiserwagen – 23 November 1823, Berlin) was a Prussian officer who fought in the Napoleonic Wars and was a Knight of the Order Pour le Mérite (Blue Max). (Note: Alternative spelling: von Tresckow.)

== See also ==
- Order of Battle of the Waterloo Campaign.
