= Henri François Marie Charpentier =

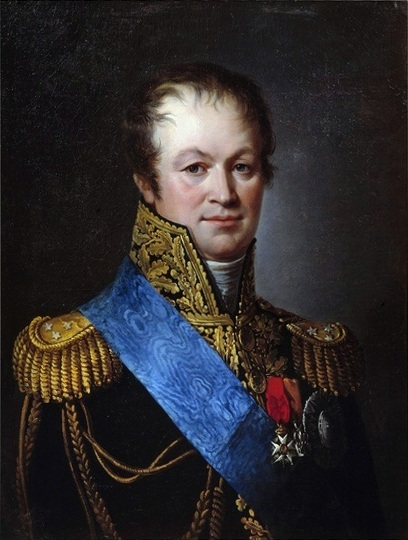
- Henri François Marie Charpentier
- Born: 23 June 1769; Soissons, Aisne, France
- Died: 14 October 1831 (aged 62) Villers-Cotterêts, Aisne, France
- Allegiance: France
- Branch: Staff, Infantry
- Service years: 1792–1815
- Rank: General of Division
- Conflicts: War of the First Coalition; Battle of Grandreng; Battle of Erquelinnes; Battle of Gosselies; Siege of Luxembourg; War of the Second Coalition; Battle of Trebbia; Battle of Novi; Battle of Montebello; Battle of Marengo; Peninsular War; Battle of Burgos; War of the Fifth Coalition; Battle of Sacile; Battle of Caldiero; Battle of Piave River; Battle of Tarvis; Battle of Raab; Battle of Wagram; War of the Sixth Coalition; Battle of Smolensk; Battle of Lützen; Battle of Bautzen; Battle of the Katzbach; Battle of Leipzig; Battle of Hanau; Battle of Arnhem; Battle of Craonne; Battle of Laon; Battle of Fère-Champenoise; Battle of Paris
- Awards: Légion d'Honneur, CC 1804; Order of Saint Louis, 1814
- Other work: Count of the Empire, 1810

Henri François Marie Charpentier (French pronunciation: [ɑ̃ʁi fʁɑ̃swa maʁi ʃaʁpɑ̃tje]; 23 June 1769 – 14 October 1831) became a French chief of staff during the French Revolutionary Wars and a division commander during the Napoleonic Wars. In 1791 he joined a volunteer battalion and later became a staff officer. He served as Jacques Desjardin's chief of staff when that general served as commander of the right wing of the Army of the North during the battles of Grandreng, Erquelinnes and Gosselies in 1794. Next year he was Jacques Maurice Hatry's chief of staff during the Siege of Luxembourg. He was promoted to general of brigade and fought at the Trebbia and Novi in 1799 and fought at Montebello and Marengo in 1800. Napoleon appointed him general of division in 1804.

In 1806 Charpentier became chief of staff to Eugène de Beauharnais in Italy but later fought at Burgos in Spain in 1808. Serving under Eugène again, in 1809 he was present at Sacile, Caldiero, the Piave, Tarvis, Raab and Wagram. During the 1812 French invasion of Russia, he fought at Smolensk. In 1813 he led an infantry division in the XI Corps at Lützen, Bautzen, Katzbach, Leipzig, Hanau and Arnhem. In 1814 he led a Young Guard division at Craonne, Laon, Fère-Champenoise and Paris. His surname is one of the names inscribed under the Arc de Triomphe, on Column 26.
