= XI Corps (Grande Armée) =

- Active: 1812–1814
- Country: First French Empire
- Branch: French Imperial Army
- Size: Corps
- Engagements: Russian campaign War of the Sixth Coalition

Commanders
- Notable commanders: Pierre Augereau; Jacques MacDonald; Auguste de Marmont

The XI Corps of the Grande Armée was a French military unit that existed during the Napoleonic Wars. In 1812, the corps was formed for the invasion of Russia and placed under Marshal Pierre Augereau. It did not fight in any battles and instead served a collection point for reserves. In spring 1813, it was reorganized and placed under the command of Marshal Jacques MacDonald. The corps fought at Lützen, Bautzen, the Katzbach, Leipzig, and Hanau in 1813. Still under MacDonald, the unit fought at Bar-sur-Aube and several minor actions in 1814.

== Order of battle ==
=== November 1812 ===
XI Corps: Marshal Pierre Augereau

- 30th Infantry Division: General of Division Étienne Heudelet de Bierre
  - 1st Provisional Demi-Brigade
    - 2nd Light Infantry Regiment, 4th Battalion
    - 4th Light Infantry Regiment, 4th Battalion
    - 17th Light Infantry Regiment, 4th Battalion
  - 6th Provisional Demi-Brigade
    - 16th Light Infantry Regiment, 4th Battalion
    - 21st Light Infantry Regiment, 4th Battalion
    - 28th Light Infantry Regiment, 4th Battalion
    - 28th Line Infantry Regiment, 1st Battalion
    - 43rd Line Infantry Regiment (2 companies)
    - 65th Line Infantry Regiment (1 company)
  - 7th Provisional Demi-Brigade
    - 8th Line Infantry Regiment, 4th Battalion
    - 14th Line Infantry Regiment, 4th Battalion
    - 94th Line Infantry Regiment, 4th Battalion
  - 8th Provisional Demi-Brigade
    - 54th Line Infantry Regiment, 4th Battalion
    - 88th Line Infantry Regiment, 4th Battalion
    - 95th Line Infantry Regiment, 4th Battalion
    - 128th Line Infantry Regiment, 3rd Battalion
  - 9th Provisional Demi-Brigade
    - 24th Line Infantry Regiment, 4th Battalion
    - 45th Line Infantry Regiment, 4th Battalion
    - 59th Line Infantry Regiment, 4th Battalion
    - 127th Line Infantry Regiment, 3rd Battalion
  - 17th Provisional Demi-Brigade
    - 6th Light Infantry Regiment, 4th Battalion
    - 25th Light Infantry Regiment, 4th Battalion
    - 39th Line Infantry Regiment, 4th Battalion
- 31st Infantry Division: General of Division Joseph Lagrange
  - 10th Provisional Demi-Brigade
    - 27th Line Infantry Regiment, 4th Battalion
    - 63rd Line Infantry Regiment, 4th Battalion
    - 76th Line Infantry Regiment, 4th Battalion
    - 96th Line Infantry Regiment, 4th Battalion
  - 11th Provisional Demi-Brigade
    - 27th Light Infantry Regiment, 4th Battalion
    - 50th Line Infantry Regiment, 4th Battalion
    - 2nd Méditerranée Regiment, 3rd Battalion
  - 12th Provisional Demi-Brigade
    - 123rd Line Infantry Regiment, 3rd Battalion
    - 124th Line Infantry Regiment, 4th Battalion
    - 125th Line Infantry Regiment, 4th Battalion
    - 129th Line Infantry Regiment, 4th Battalion
  - 13th Provisional Demi-Brigade
    - 5th Line Infantry Regiment, 4th Battalion
    - 11th Line Infantry Regiment, 4th Battalion
    - 79th Line Infantry Regiment, 4th Battalion
- 32nd Infantry Division: General of Division Pierre François Joseph Durutte
  - Brigades: unknown
    - Belle-Isle Regiment, 2nd, 3rd, and 4th Battalions
    - Isle de Ré Regiment, 2nd, 3rd, and 4th Battalions
    - Walcheren Regiment, 2nd, 3rd, and 4th Battalions
    - 1st Méditerranée Regiment, 1st and 2nd Battalions
    - 2nd Méditerranée Regiment, 1st, 2nd, and 4th Battalions
- 33rd Infantry Division: General of Brigade François Détrés
  - 1st Brigade: Neapolitans
    - Royal Calabrian Regiment
    - Naples Regiment
    - Marine Battalion
  - 2nd Brigade: Neapolitans
    - Prince Lucien Regiment
    - Garde Vélites Regiment
- 34th Infantry Division: General of Division Charles Antoine Morand
  - 1st Brigade:
    - 3rd Line Infantry Regiment, 4th Battalion
    - 29th Line Infantry Regiment, 3rd and 4th Battalions
    - 105th Line Infantry Regiment, 4th Battalion
    - 113th Line Infantry Regiment, 3rd and 4th Battalions
  - 2nd Brigade:
    - 4th Westphalian Infantry Regiment
    - Hessian Light Infantry Regiment
    - 4th Ducal Saxon Infantry Regiment, 4th Battalion

=== October 1813 ===
XI Corps: Marshal Jacques MacDonald

- 31st Infantry Division: General of Division François Roch Ledru des Essarts
  - 1st Brigade: General of Brigade Philibert Fressinet
    - 11th Provisional Line Infantry Regiment (3 battalions)
    - 13th Provisional Line Infantry Regiment (3 battalions)
  - 2nd Brigade: General of Brigade François Nizard d'Henin
    - Westphalian 8th Line Infantry Regiment (2 battalions)
    - Westphalian Light Infantry Regiment (1 battalion)
  - 3rd Brigade: General of Brigade Macdonald
    - Neapolitan 4th Light Infantry Regiment (2 battalions)
    - Neapolitan Elite Battalion
  - Divisional Artillery:
    - Westphalian Foot Battery (6 guns)
    - Westphalian Foot Battery (6 guns)
    - French Foot Battery (8 guns)
- 35th Infantry Division: General of Division Étienne Maurice Gérard
  - 1st Brigade: General of Brigade Georges-Hippolyte Le Senescal
    - 6th Line Infantry Regiment (3 battalions)
    - 112th Line Infantry Regiment (4 battalions)
  - 2nd Brigade: General of Brigade Carlo Zucchi
    - Italian 2nd Light Infantry Regiment (2 battalions)
    - Italian 5th Line Infantry Regiment (4 battalions)
  - Divisional Artillery: Captain Marullier
    - Italian Foot Battery (8 guns)
    - Italian Horse Battery (6 guns)
- 36th Infantry Division: General of Division Henri François Marie Charpentier
  - 1st Brigade: General of Brigade François Martin Valentin Simmer
    - 22nd Light Infantry Regiment (4 battalions)
    - 10th Line Infantry Regiment (2 battalions)
  - 2nd Brigade: General of Brigade Claude Marie Meunier
    - 3rd Light Infantry Regiment (2 battalions)
    - 14th Light Infantry Regiment (3 battalions)
  - Divisional Artillery: Captain Bourgon
    - French Foot Battery (8 guns)
    - French Foot Battery (8 guns)
- 39th Infantry Division: General of Division Jean Gabriel Marchand
  - 1st Brigade: General-Major von Stockhorn
    - Baden 1st Line Infantry Regiment (2 battalions)
    - Baden 3rd Line Infantry Regiment (2 battalions)
  - 2nd Brigade: General-Major Louis I, Grand Duke of Hesse
    - Hesse-Darmstadt Guard Fusilier Battalion
    - Hesse-Darmstadt Leibgarde Regiment (2 battalions)
    - Hesse-Darmstadt Leib Regiment (2 battalions)
  - Divisional Artillery: Captain Bourgon
    - Baden Foot Battery (4 guns)
    - Hesse-Darmstadt Foot Battery (3 guns)
- Attached to Corps:
  - Reserve Artillery: General of Division Joseph Marie de Pernety
    - 12-pound Foot Battery (8 guns)
    - 12-pound Foot Battery (8 guns)
    - Foot Battery (6 guns)
    - Neapolitan Foot Battery (unknown number of guns)
  - 28th Light Cavalry Brigade: General of Brigade Alexandre Montbrun
    - Italian 4th Chasseur-à-Cheval Regiment (2 squadrons)
    - Neapolitan 2nd Chasseur-à-Cheval Regiment (4 squadrons)
