= Battle of Arcis-sur-Aube =

1814 battle during the War of the Sixth Coalition

- Part of the Campaign of France of the Sixth Coalition
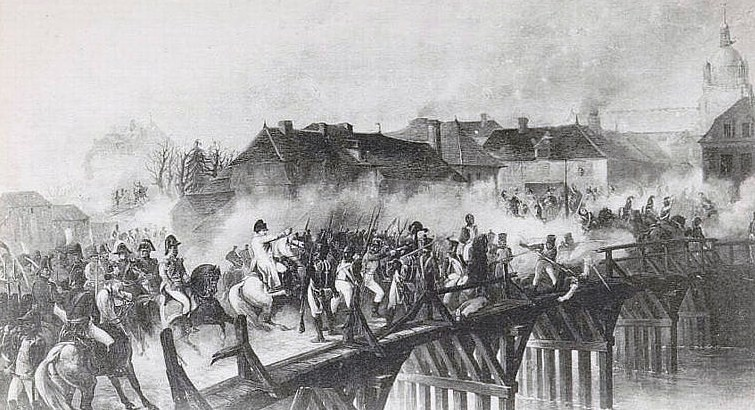
- Napoleon at the bridge of Arcis-sur-Aube by Jean-Adolphe Beaucé
Date	20–21 March 1814
Location	Arcis-sur-Aube, France 48°32′17″N 04°08′31″E
Result	Coalition victory

Belligerents
(Austrian Empire) Austria (Kingdom of Bavaria) Bavaria (Russian Empire) Russia (Kingdom of Württemberg) Württemberg (Kingdom of Prussia) Prussia	(First French Empire) France

Commanders and leaders
(Russian Empire) Alexander I (Austrian Empire) Karl von Schwarzenberg (Kingdom of Bavaria) Karl Philipp von Wrede (Kingdom of Württemberg) Crown Prince William	(First French Empire) Napoleon I (First French Empire) Nicolas Oudinot (First French Empire) Michel Ney (First French Empire) Horace Sébastiani

Strength
74,000–107,900	Day 1: 18,000; Day 2: 28,000–30,000

Casualties and losses
3,000–4,000	3,000–4,200, 3 guns
- Location within France

War of the Sixth Coalition:
Campaign in north-east France
current battle
Napoleon in command
Napoleon not in command

The Battle of Arcis-sur-Aube (20–21 March 1814) saw an Imperial French army under Napoleon face a much larger Allied army led by Karl Philipp, Prince of Schwarzenberg during the War of the Sixth Coalition. On the second day of fighting, Emperor Napoleon finally realized he had blundered into battle as he was massively outnumbered, and immediately ordered a masked retreat. By the time the Austrian Field Marshal Schwarzenberg realized Napoleon was retreating, most of the French had already disengaged and the Allied pursuit afterwards failed to prevent the remaining French army from safely withdrawing to the north. This was Napoleon's penultimate battle before his abdication and exile to Elba, the last being the Battle of Saint-Dizier.

While Napoleon fought against Prussian Field Marshal Gebhard Leberecht von Blücher's Russo-Prussian army to the north, Schwarzenberg's army pushed Marshal Jacques MacDonald's army back toward Paris. After his victory at Reims, Napoleon moved south to threaten Schwarzenberg's supply line to Germany. In response, the Austrian field marshal pulled his army back to Troyes and Arcis-sur-Aube. When Napoleon occupied Arcis, the normally cautious Schwarzenberg determined to fight it out rather than retreat. The clashes on the first day were inconclusive and Napoleon mistakenly believed he was following up a retreating enemy. On the second day, the French advanced to high ground and were appalled to see between 74,000 and 100,000 enemies in battle array south of Arcis. After bitter fighting with Napoleon personally participating, the French troops fought their way out, but it was a French setback.

== Background ==
=== Operations in the north ===
At the end of February 1814, Napoleon discovered that the Allied armies of Schwarzenberg and Blücher had separated and that Blücher's army was making a lunge at Paris with 53,000 soldiers. Only 10,000 men under Marshals Auguste de Marmont and Édouard Mortier stood in Blücher's path. The French emperor left 42,000 troops under marshals MacDonald and Nicolas Oudinot to contain Schwarzenberg's main army and headed northwest with 35,000 soldiers to deal with the Prussian field marshal. Marmont and Mortier repulsed Blücher in the Battle of Gué-à-Tresmes on 28 February. However, Napoleon failed to catch Blücher who slipped out of the trap. At this time, the French emperor adopted a plan to first drive Blücher far away to the north, then to gather up the French frontier garrisons and finally to swoop down on Schwarzenberg's supply line to Germany.

As Napoleon's 48,000-man army chased Blücher's army to the north, the Allies absorbed many reinforcements. These were led by Russian general Ferdinand von Wintzingerode and Prussian general Friedrich Wilhelm Freiherr von Bülow. The French emperor believed that his opponent had 70,000 soldiers, but in fact, Blücher's army numbered 110,000. On 7 March, Napoleon fought against Mikhail Semyonovich Vorontsov's Russians in the Battle of Craonne which one authority called a French Pyrrhic victory. On 9–10 March Blücher defeated Napoleon's much weaker army in the Battle of Laon. Marmont's corps was routed, but Napoleon bluffed the Allies into not pursuing his beaten army. On 12 March an Allied corps under Emmanuel de Saint-Priest seized Reims from its French garrison. Napoleon immediately ordered his army to march to that city where he won the Battle of Reims the next day. Saint-Priest was mortally wounded and his corps routed with a loss of 3,000 men and 23 guns.

=== Napoleon strikes south ===
Napoleon spent three days resting his troops at Reims while Marshal Michel Ney reoccupied Châlons-sur-Marne. Ney was joined by a 3,000-man division that Jan Willem Janssens brought in from the Ardennes garrisons. The French emperor desired to move east to gather up other garrisons, but Schwarzenberg's offensive to the south compelled him to march in that direction. While Napoleon operated against Blücher in the north, the main Allied army pressed MacDonald back toward Paris. On 27 February, Schwarzenberg defeated Oudinot in the Battle of Bar-sur-Aube, forcing MacDonald to withdraw to the west. The Allies overpowered MacDonald on 3–4 March at the Battle of Laubressel. Schwarzenberg occupied Troyes but halted there until 12 March in a welter of indecision. Encouraged by news of Blucher's victory at Laon, the main Allied army crossed the River Seine and drove MacDonald beyond Provins by 16 March. Schwarzenberg's offensive came to a sudden halt when tidings of Napoleon's success at Reims arrived in the Allied camp.

Napoleon decided to move against Schwarzenberg with 24,000 soldiers plus reinforcements, while Marmont and Mortier with 21,000 troops observed Blücher's army. The French emperor determined to march toward Arcis-sur-Aube, hoping to reach Troyes in the rear of the Allied main army. On 17 March Schwarzenberg withdrew his army toward the area between Troyes and Arcis. The following day, Napoleon's advance guards drove Schwarzenberg's cavalry south toward Arcis, creating alarm among the Allied leaders. The Austro-Bavarian V Corps under Karl Philipp von Wrede was ordered to hold Arcis until the remainder of Schwarzenberg's army could retreat east from Troyes to Bar-sur-Aube. In the afternoon of 19 March, the French began to cross the River Aube at Plancy-l'Abbaye. A cavalry division under Louis-Michel Letort de Lorville continued southwest to Méry-sur-Seine where it captured an Allied pontoon train. The French cavalry divisions of Remi Joseph Isidore Exelmans and Pierre David de Colbert-Chabanais moved east on the south bank of the Aube from Plancy to Pouan-les-Vallées, halfway to Arcis.

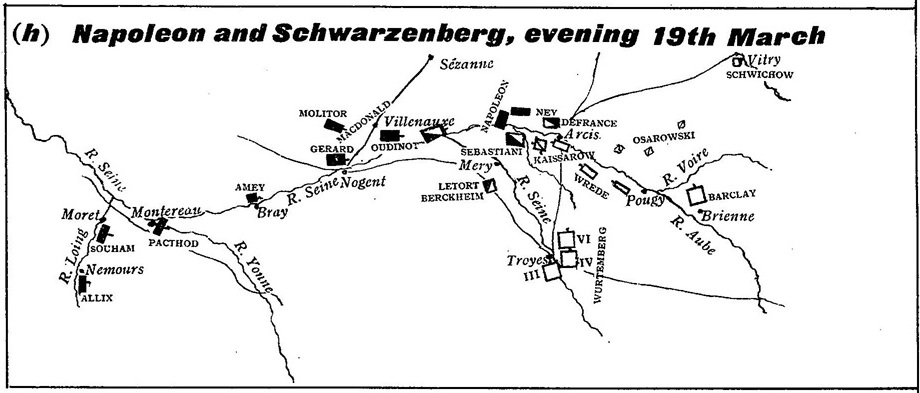
Positions, evening 19 March 1814, before the Battle of Arcis-sur-Aube.

Schwarzenberg interpreted this information as an indication that Napoleon's main thrust was along the axis Plancy-Méry-Troyes. Believing that his communications were no longer threatened, he determined in the evening of 19 March to mass his army between Troyes and Arcis with the intention of advancing against the French. The Austrian army commander ordered Crown Prince William of Württemberg to assume command of the Allied III, IV and VI Corps and move to Charmont-sous-Barbuise, midway between Arcis and Troyes. The Guards and Reserve under Michael Andreas Barclay de Tolly were directed to cross from the north to the south bank of the Aube and take a position at Mesnil-Lettre. On this day, MacDonald's army was moving east along the north bank of the Seine with its leading elements at Pont-sur-Seine.

Napoleon believed that Schwarzenberg was in full retreat east to Bar-sur-Aube. In order to hurry the main Allied army on its way, the French emperor decided to move east on both the north and south banks of the Aube to seize Arcis. Once he gave the Allies a good shove, Napoleon planned to take the French army across the Marne at Vitry-le-François, march east and add the eastern garrisons to his army. The French emperor planned to add MacDonald's 30,000 troops and Marmont's 20,000 men to his army while on the march. Napoleon's assessment of the situation was correct until Schwarzenberg decided to assume the offensive late on 19 March.

== Battle ==
=== First day ===
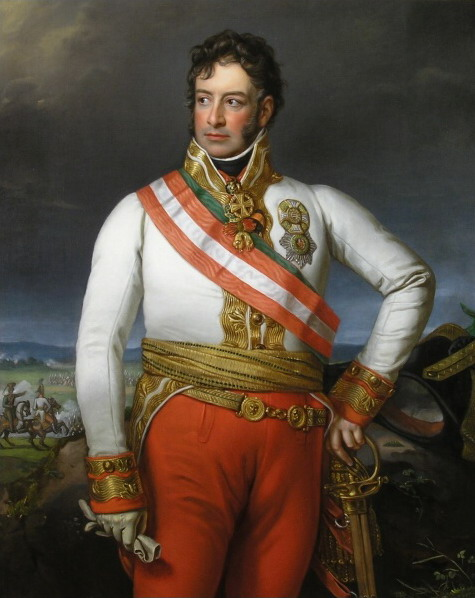
Prince Schwarzenberg

On 20 March, Schwarzenberg ordered Wrede to take position at Saint-Nabord-sur-Aube while extending the Crown Prince of Württemberg's three corps between there and Voué. The Austrian field marshal intended to begin a westward advance at 11 am. Assuming that Napoleon was marching across his front from Plancy to Méry, Schwarzenberg hoped to smash into the exposed French flank. However, Napoleon was advancing east, not south, which threw off all of the Austrian army commander's plans. In the event, the Crown Prince misunderstood his instructions and moved his troops to Prémierfait, taking them out of the day's battle. Normally a proponent of vigorous measures, Tsar Alexander disapproved of Schwarzenberg's resumption of the offensive.

Early in the morning, Ney and Horace Sebastiani's cavalry advanced east along the south bank of the Aube. At 10:00 a.m. the French-occupied Arcis-sur-Aube which was abandoned by Wrede's Bavarians. Local residents repeatedly warned that large Allied forces were within 12 miles (19 km) of Arcis. Ney and Sebastiani forwarded this information to Napoleon but the French emperor refused to believe it. The French quickly repaired the bridge over the Aube, which was only partially demolished by the Allies. Ney's original orders called for his troops to cross to the north bank in preparation for a move eastward. Ney placed Janssens' division with its left flank in Torcy-le-Grand on the south bank of the Aube. Sebastiani's cavalry took a position to Janssens' right while Pierre François Xavier Boyer's division was placed in reserve. (Boyer's division had only one brigade. Its second brigade was detached at the end of February and later became the third brigade of Jean François Leval's division.)

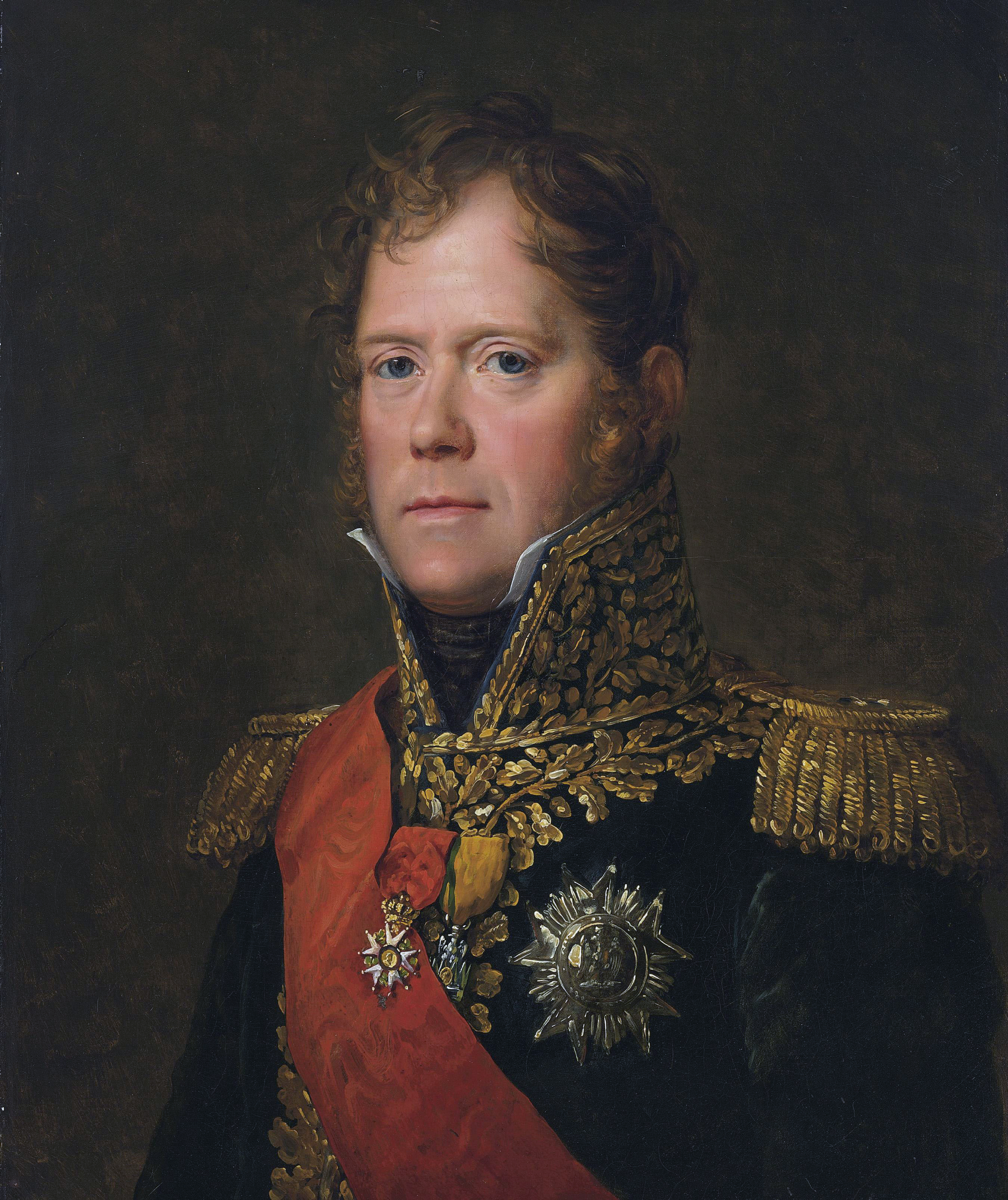
Michel Ney

At 1:00 pm. Napoleon arrived along the northern bank of the Aube river, crossed the bridge and met with Ney at Torcy-le-Grand. Convinced that the Allies were in full retreat, the French emperor accepted the report of a staff officer that only 1,000 Cossacks were nearby. Though he now knew that the Crown Prince's left wing was out of touch, Schwarzenberg finally gave the order to launch an attack at 2:00 pm. Wrede's infantry advanced on Torcy-le-Grand while a mass of Allied cavalry moved forward to challenge Sebastiani's horsemen. Paisiy Sergeevich Kaisarov ordered an artillery bombardment, followed with a cavalry charge by his Cossacks, the Archduke Joseph Hussar Nr. 2 and Szekler Hussar Nr. 11 Regiments and Leopold von Geramb's Austrian light cavalry brigade. The attack overthrew Colbert's division in the first line and soon involved the defeat of Exelmans' division in the second line.

As a mob of fleeing French cavalry galloped for the Arcis bridge, Napoleon drew his sword and rode into their path shouting, "See who will re-cross the bridge before me". At the same time, the crack troops of Louis Friant's Old Guard division began crossing the bridge and took up a position to defend Arcis. Sebastiani's badly shaken horsemen slowly began to recover from their panic and reorganize. During this crisis an Allied howitzer shell landed sputtering near the rallying troops. Seeing his soldiers flinching from the missile, Napoleon intentionally rode his horse directly over the bomb. The shell exploded and killed the horse, which went down, taking the emperor with it. Napoleon soon emerged unscathed from a cloud of smoke, mounted a fresh horse and rode off to inspect his army.

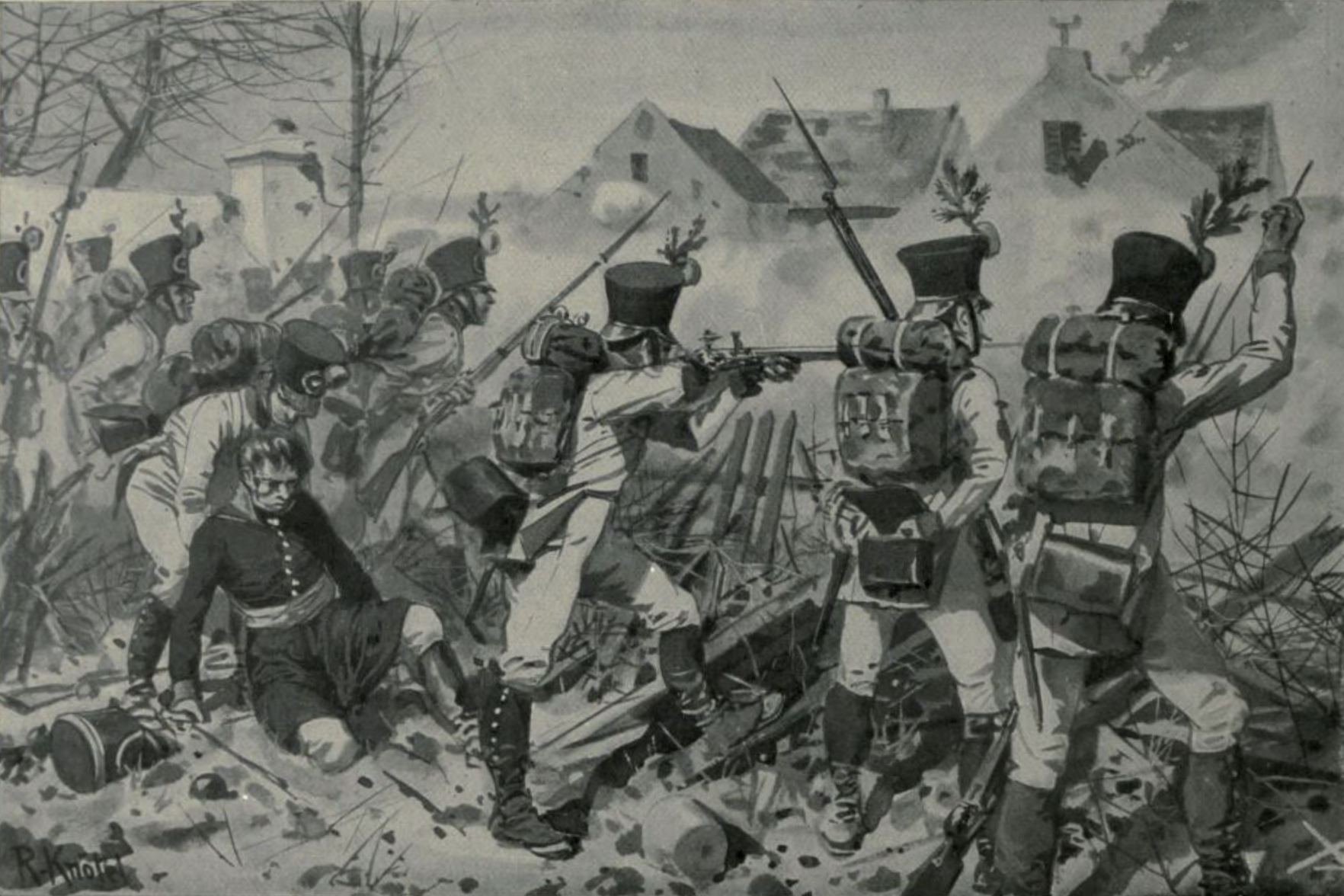
Austrian infantrymen fight in Torcy-le-Grand.

Wrede sent more cavalry to reinforce Kaisarov and ordered Anton Volkmann's Austrian brigade to capture Torcy-le-Grand. The Bavarian corps commander hoped to seize the Arcis bridge to prevent more French reinforcements from arriving. Spearheaded by the Austrian Archduke Rudolf Infantry Regiment, Volkmann's first attack broke into Torcy-le-Grand but was repelled by Guillaume Charles Rousseau's brigade. However, Volkmann's second attack drove the French from Torcy-le-Grand and it was necessary for Boyer's troops to recapture the village, supported by intense artillery fire. Wrede ordered Peter de Lamotte's Bavarian division to execute a third assault. The Allies captured Torcy-le-Grand for the third time but were ejected from the place by two Old Guard Grenadier battalions, a squadron of mounted gendarmes and a squadron of lancers. Between 5:00 and 8:00 pm, the French repulsed repeated assaults by the brigades of Volkmann, Georg Habermann and Prince Karl Theodor of Bavaria. The Allies detached the 1st Russian Grenadier Division under Pavel Nikolaevich Choglokov from the Reserve and sent it to support Wrede's corps. The Archduke Rudolf Regiment suffered 500 casualties in the bitter fighting. Janssens was wounded and replaced by Étienne Nicolas Lefol.

At 2:00 pm, Letort's guard cavalry left Méry with the newly captured pontoon train. During the afternoon, they became embroiled with the Crown Prince's cavalry under Peter Petrovich Pahlen, Prince Adam of Württemberg and Johann Nepomuk von Nostitz-Rieneck. Letort's horsemen inflicted 100 casualties on their foes while sustaining the loss of 120 men and three pontoons. Though assisted by Jean Nicolas Curely's brigade from Sigismond Frédéric de Berckheim's cavalry division, the French were driven back to Méry. Nevertheless, that evening Letort set out for Arcis via Plancy, leaving the pontoon train with Berckheim.

At dusk, a 2,000-strong cavalry division under Charles Lefebvre-Desnouettes rode into Arcis. A new 4,500-man Young Guard division led by Christophe Henrion made it as far as Plancy before stopping to rest. Sebastiani's rallied cavalry had skirmished with Kaisarov's Allied horsemen all day. Deciding upon a night attack using Lefebvre-Desnouettes' fresh cavalry, Sebastiani placed guard lancers and Éclaireurs in the front rank, supported by cuirassiers. He hoped to silence an Allied artillery battery on Wrede's left flank. Sebastiani's "magnificent" charge smashed Kaisarov's Cossacks and then veered to the left, pressing back some Austrian regiments. What was remarkable is that the attack included the jaded troopers of Colbert and Exelmans, who were routed earlier in the day. A brigade of Russian grenadiers formed a square and repelled the French horsemen. Bavarian, Russian, Austrian, and even a Prussian Guard cavalry squadron concentrated against the French, forcing their enemies to pull back, though they did it in good order. The cavalry of the two armies ended the fight with the village of Nozay between them.

=== Second day ===
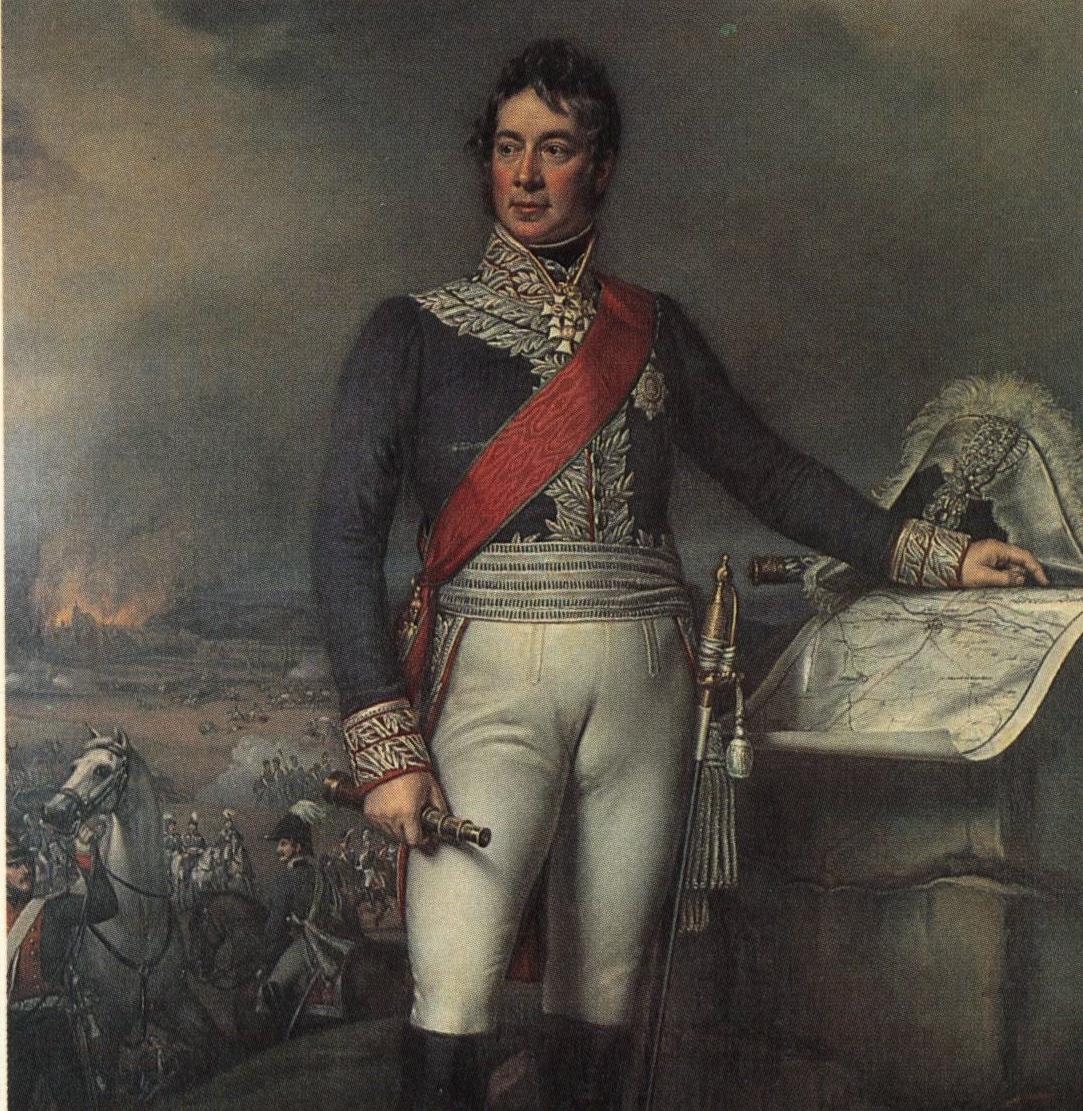
Karl Philipp von Wrede

On the first day, the Allies probably sustained 2,000 casualties and the French somewhat fewer. Despite their vastly superior numbers, the Allies did not gain an inch of ground. If Napoleon had understood that he was facing an army several times larger than his own, he probably would have retreated to the north bank of the Aube during the night. In fact, Tsar Alexander feared that Napoleon would pull back to the north bank and lunge east, seizing the bridge at Lesmont in the Allied rear. However, Napoleon still suffered from the delusion that Schwarzenberg's army was in retreat while Wrede acted as rearguard. Though Schwarzenberg sent out his orders at 11:00 pm, the Crown Prince's copy went astray and did not reach him until 5:00 a.m. on 21 March. Therefore, it took until 10:00 a.m. for the Crown Prince's three corps to deploy between Wrede's left flank and the Barbuise stream. The III Corps took post on Wrede's left, the IV Corps was next and the VI Corps was on the extreme left near Voué. Part of the III Corps had been left behind to hold Troyes.

Historian Francis Loraine Petre stated that the Allies had 74,000 soldiers in line and 14,000 more guarding Troyes and the line of the Seine. David G. Chandler asserted that Schwarzenberg brought up and deployed over 80,000 troops to face the French. On the second day, the Allied host faced 28,000 French soldiers, of whom 9,000 were cavalrymen. George Nafziger credited the Allies with 83,400 infantry and 24,500 cavalry and Napoleon with 29,800 troops. Digby Smith and Gaston Bodart counted 100,000 Allied soldiers of whom only 43,000 came into action while the French army numbered 23,000-foot soldiers and 7,000 horsemen.

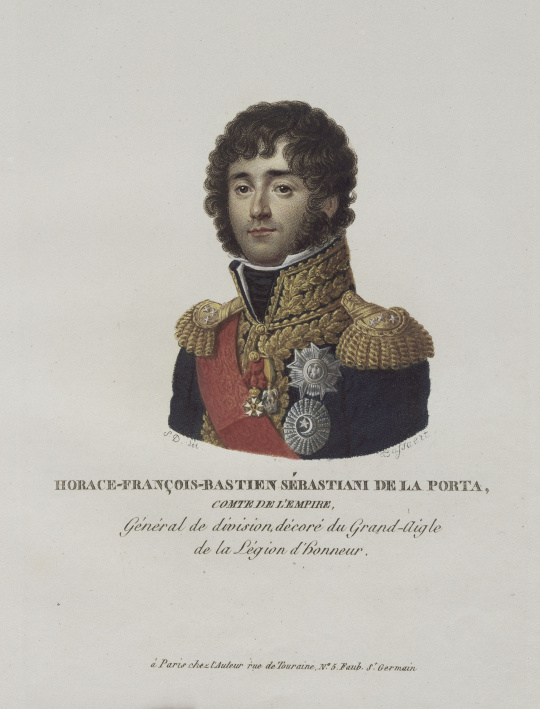
Horace Sebastiani

Napoleon, whose army numbered only 18,000 men on the first day, awaited reinforcements. Henrion's division, consisting of the depots of the Young Guard, reached Arcis. Oudinot with Leval's VII Corps infantry division and the II Cavalry Corps under Antoine Louis Decrest de Saint-Germain arrived at Arcis at 8:00 am. MacDonald's II Corps, XI Corps, V Cavalry Corps and VI Cavalry Corps were still one day's march away. However, another source stated that Édouard Jean Baptiste Milhaud's V Cavalry Corps arrived on 21 March. The cavalry divisions of Berckheim and Jean-Marie Defrance also joined the French army at Arcis. Napoleon sent patrols to the east, but these detected nothing suspicious because Wrede had pulled back. At 10:00 a.m. the French emperor gave the order to attack. Altogether, Napoleon counted a total of 28,000 troops on 21 March.

As the troops of Ney and Sebastiani reached the crest of the plateau, they found themselves facing perhaps 100,000 enemies arrayed in three lines stretching from the Aube to the Barbuise. In front of this immense host were skirmishers and at least 100 field guns. Sebastiani immediately attacked Pahlen's cavalry, opposite him, driving it back on the second line. The French position was extremely dangerous, especially since Torcy-le-Grand was left empty of troops and Arcis was lightly held. In this crisis, Ney kept his battalions in column, ready to retreat. If Schwarzenberg had launched a general attack at this time, the French army would have been shattered. Instead, the Austrian army commander called a council of war, which lasted until noon. The council decided to attack and Schwarzenberg drew up detailed instructions. However, he alone would give the signal to advance.

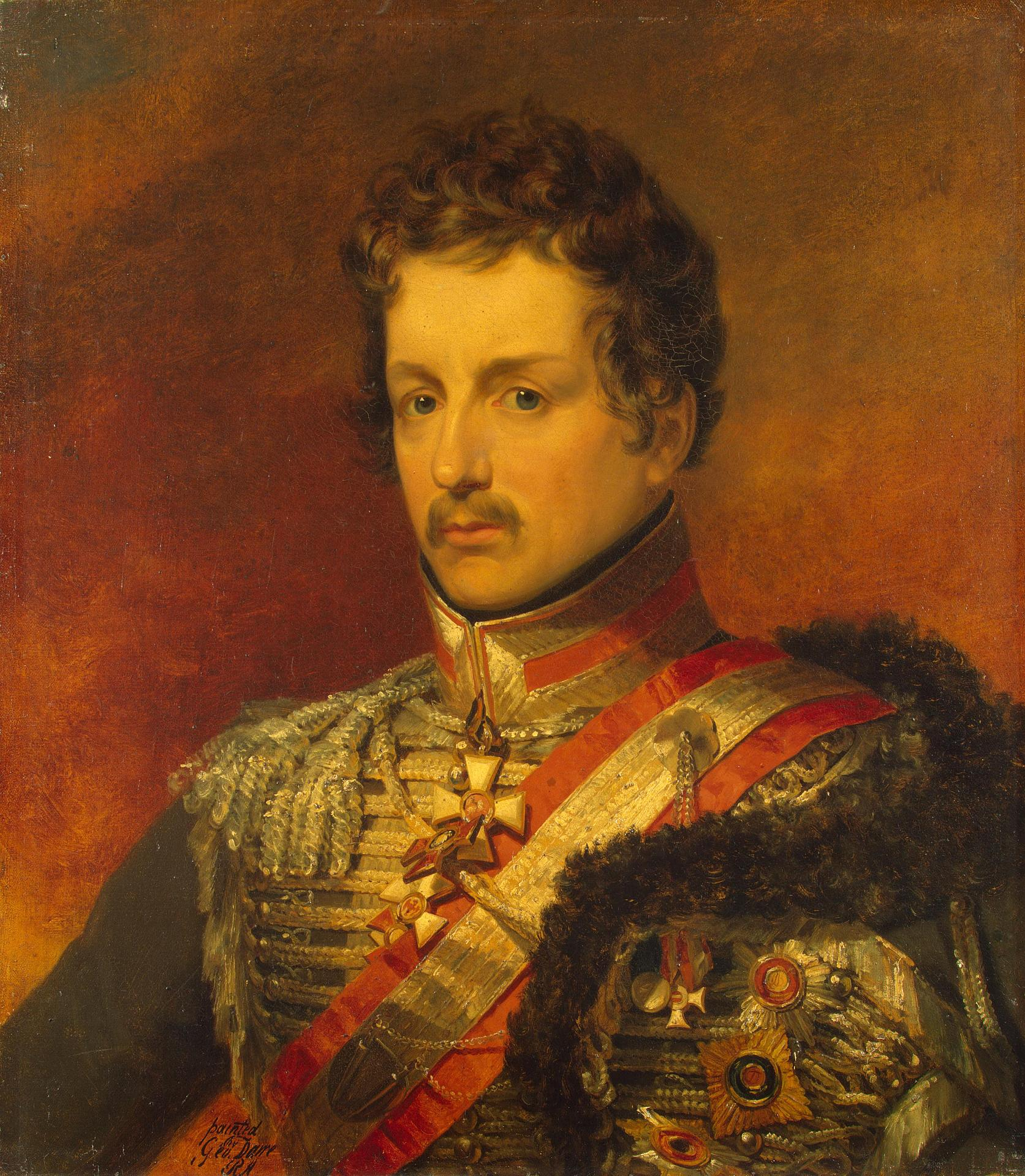
Peter Pahlen

Sebastiani's attack on Pahlen convinced Schwarzenberg that Napoleon was getting ready to advance. Actually, by 1:00 pm. Napoleon finally came to the realization that he was desperately outnumbered and needed to get his army out of danger. Ney began to pull his divisions back. A flurry of orders issued from Imperial Headquarters. By 1:30 pm, a bridge of boats was established at Villette-sur-Aube a short distance west of Arcis. Soon afterward, Antoine Drouot and the Old Guard were instructed to retreat by the Villette bridge while Lefol's division and the reserve artillery crossed the Arcis span. The cavalry corps of Saint-Germain and Milhaud soon joined the retreat. Sebastiani was ordered to cover the operation, which his cavalry did by a phased withdrawal. In desperation, General Exelman personally delivered the Sailors of the Guard to protect the Villete Bridge, which was masterfully done. To keep the Allies from interfering with the retreat, Napoleon ordered Oudinot to defend Arcis using Leval's division, consisting of three brigades of Peninsular War veterans.

At 3:00 pm, Schwarzenberg finally realized that Napoleon was retreating. Instead of unleashing his corps at once, he called another council of war. Wrede was ordered to cross to the north bank of the Aube at Chaudrey, to the east of Arcis. Only his cavalry made it across the river there and his infantry had to march upstream and cross at Lesmont. The Crown Prince (IV Corps) and Ignaz Gyulai (III Corps) were directed to attack Arcis while the Russian grenadiers attacked Torcy-le-Grand. Meanwhile, Pahlen and Nikolay Raevsky (VI Corps) also pressed forward. During this advance, the Allied cavalry claimed to have captured a French cavalry brigade, while Pahlen's horsemen captured three cannons. By 4:00 pm, the Allies arrived near Arcis which they took under fire with 80 cannons. In the face of this bombardment, Sebastiani withdrew his surviving horsemen across the Villette bridge and broke it down.

Oudinot deployed François Maulmont's brigade on the right and Jacques de Montfort's brigade on the left, with David Hendrik Chassé's brigade in reserve. At this time, Henri Rottembourg's 5th Young Guard Division took up a position covering the north end of the Arcis bridge; it had escorted Oudinot's train. The intense Allied bombardment caused Oudinot's soldiers serious losses and threw the troops withdrawing across the bridge into confusion. The 10th Light Infantry Regiment drove back an initial attack on Arcis, but the Allies soon forced their way into Arcis in great strength and Leval was wounded. With the defense at the last gasp, Chassé rallied 100 soldiers by beating the charge on a drum. This allowed the last few troops to make their way onto the bridge and safety at 6:00 pm. Maulmont's brigade destroyed the bridge after it crossed.

== Conclusion ==
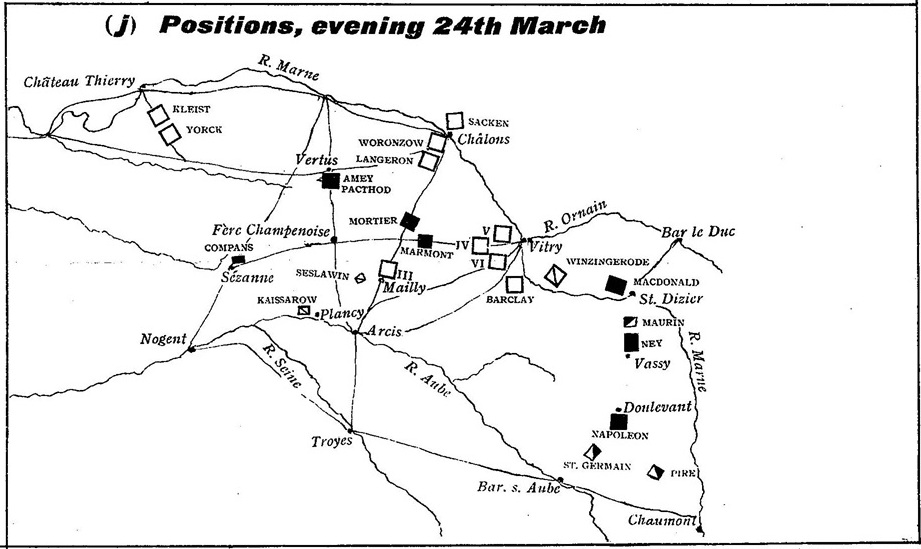
Positions, evening 24 March 1814: This was before the Battles of Fère-Champenoise and Saint-Dizier.

That evening, Oudinot blocked the causeway on the north bank of the Aube with his troops. MacDonald reached nearby Ormes with two divisions at 9:00 pm, joining François Étienne de Kellermann's cavalry corps. Étienne Maurice Gérard's corps reached Plancy while the division of François Pierre Joseph Amey was farther west at Anglure. Luckily for the French, the Allies did not try to cross to the north bank and disrupt MacDonald's strung out forces. The rest of Napoleon's army was headed north to Sompuis. From there, the French emperor planned to follow his plan to march east to Saint-Dizier and operate against the Allied supply lines. All day on 22 March, MacDonald's troops blocked the bridge at Arcis so that the Allies were completely unaware of Napoleon's movements.

Chandler wrote that the battle cost the French 3,000 casualties and the Allies 4,000 casualties. Smith and Bodart stated that the French lost 3,400 killed and wounded plus three guns and 800 men captured. Allied losses were about 3,000. Nafziger agreed that the French suffered 4,200 casualties. He added that the Bavarian corps alone lost 224 officers and 2,000 rank and file casualties. The French fought extremely well. On the first day, the divisions of Janssens and Boyer and two battalions of the Old Guard, perhaps 7,000 men, had fought Wrede's 22,000 soldiers to a standstill. On 25 March the Allies defeated Marmont and Mortier at the Battle of Fère-Champenoise. Napoleon won a useless victory at the Battle of Saint-Dizier the following day. The Battle of Paris was fought on 30 March and the Allies occupied the French capital the next day. Napoleon abdicated on 6 April 1814.

== Forces ==
=== Coalition order of battle ===
Coalition Army at Arcis-sur-Aube, March 20, 1814
Army corps	Infantry strength	Cavalry strength	Corps/division
III Corps; Feldzeugmeister; Ignaz Gyulai	10,800	3,200	Austrian Division: Feldmarschall-Leutnant Louis Charles Folliot de Crenneville
III Corps; Feldzeugmeister; Ignaz Gyulai	10,800	3,200	Austrian Division: Feldmarschall-Leutnant Jean Charles Hennequin de Fresnel
III Corps; Feldzeugmeister; Ignaz Gyulai	10,800	3,200	Austrian Cavalry Division: Feldmarschall-Leutnant Johann Nepomuk von Nostitz-Rieneck
IV Corps; Crown Prince William of Württemberg	10,200	3,600	Württemberg Division: General-Leutnant Prince Adam of Württemberg
IV Corps; Crown Prince William of Württemberg	10,200	3,600	Württemberg Division: General-Leutnant Friedrich von Franquemont
IV Corps; Crown Prince William of Württemberg	10,200	3,600	3rd Russian Cuirassier Division: General-Leutnant Ilya Mikhailovich Duka
V Corps; General der Kavallerie; Karl Philipp von Wrede	22,100	4,800	Austrian Division: Feldmarschall-Leutnant Anton Leonhard von Hardegg
V Corps; General der Kavallerie; Karl Philipp von Wrede	22,100	4,800	Austrian Division: Feldmarschall-Leutnant Ignaz Splény de Miháldi
V Corps; General der Kavallerie; Karl Philipp von Wrede	22,100	4,800	1st Bavarian Division: General-Leutnant Joseph von Rechberg
V Corps; General der Kavallerie; Karl Philipp von Wrede	22,100	4,800	3rd Bavarian Division: General-Leutnant Peter de Lamotte
V Corps; General der Kavallerie; Karl Philipp von Wrede	22,100	4,800	1st Russian Grenadier Division: Generalmajor Pavel Nikolaevich Choglokov
VI Corps; General-Leutnant; Nikolay Raevsky	16,500	3,500	I Russian Infantry Corps: General-Leutnant Andrei Ivanovich Gorchakov
VI Corps; General-Leutnant; Nikolay Raevsky	16,500	3,500	II Russian Infantry Corps: General-Leutnant Duke Eugen of Württemberg
VI Corps; General-Leutnant; Nikolay Raevsky	16,500	3,500	Russian Cavalry Corps: General-Leutnant Peter Petrovich Pahlen
Reserve; General Michael Andreas; Barclay de Tolly	3,000 (8,000) (Note: The number 3,000 appears to be a typographical error. If 8,000 is used, then the Infantry Strength column adds up to the 83,400 total given by the source.)	1,600	Austrian Grenadiers: Feldmarschall-Leutnant Nikolaus Weissenwolf
Reserve; General Michael Andreas; Barclay de Tolly	3,000 (8,000)	1,600	2nd Russian Grenadier Division: Generalmajor Ivan Paskevich
Reserve; General Michael Andreas; Barclay de Tolly	3,000 (8,000)	1,600	2nd Russian Cuirassier Division: General-Leutnant Nikolay Vasilyevich Kretov
Reserve; General Michael Andreas; Barclay de Tolly	15,800	4,800	Russian Guard Cavalry: General-Leutnant Mikhail Miloradovich
Reserve; General Michael Andreas; Barclay de Tolly	15,800	4,800	Russian Guard Infantry: General-Leutnant Aleksey Petrovich Yermolov
Reserve; General Michael Andreas; Barclay de Tolly	15,800	4,800	Prussian Guard Cavalry: Generalmajor Friedrich von LaRoche-Starkenfels
Reserve; General Michael Andreas; Barclay de Tolly	15,800	4,800	Prussian Guard Infantry: Colonel Johann Friedrich von Alvensleben
Reserve; General Michael Andreas; Barclay de Tolly	0	3,000	Cossack Corps: Generalmajor Paisiy Sergeevich Kaisarov
Reserve; General Michael Andreas; Barclay de Tolly	0	3,000	Cossack Corps: Generalmajor Alexander Nikitich Seslavin
Army totals	83,400	24,500	

=== French order of battle ===
French Army at Arcis-sur-Aube, March 20, 1814
Commands	Strength	Division
Ney's command Marshal Michel Ney	8,000	1st Old Guard Division: General of Division Louis Friant
Ney's command Marshal Michel Ney	8,000	Provisional Guard Division: General of Brigade Christophe Henrion
Ney's command Marshal Michel Ney	5,500	Infantry Division: General of Division Jan Willem Janssens
Ney's command Marshal Michel Ney	5,500	9th Infantry Division: General of Division Pierre François Xavier Boyer
Sebastiani's command General of Division; Horace Sebastiani	7,300	1st Guard Cavalry Division: General of Division Pierre David de Colbert-Chabanais
Sebastiani's command General of Division; Horace Sebastiani	7,300	2nd Guard Cavalry Division: General of Division Charles Lefebvre-Desnouettes
Sebastiani's command General of Division; Horace Sebastiani	7,300	3rd Guard Cavalry Division: General of Brigade Louis-Michel Letort de Lorville
Sebastiani's command General of Division; Horace Sebastiani	7,300	Honor Guards Cavalry Division: General of Division Jean-Marie Defrance
Sebastiani's command General of Division; Horace Sebastiani	7,300	Cavalry Division: General of Division Remi Joseph Isidore Exelmans
Sebastiani's command General of Division; Horace Sebastiani	7,300	Cavalry Division: General of Division Sigismond Frédéric de Berckheim
Oudinot's command Marshal Nicolas Oudinot	2,500	II Cavalry Corps – Division: General of Division Antoine Louis Decrest de Saint-Germain
Oudinot's command Marshal Nicolas Oudinot	2,500	II Cavalry Corps – Division: General of Division Antoine Maurin
Oudinot's command Marshal Nicolas Oudinot	6,500	VII Corps – 7th Infantry Division: General of Division Jean François Leval
Army total	29,800	

== Notes ==
Preceded by Battle of Craonne	Napoleonic Wars; Battle of Arcis-sur-Aube	Succeeded by Battle of Fère-Champenoise
