= Battle of Laubressel =

1814 battle during the War of the Sixth Coalition

- Part of the Campaign of France of the Sixth Coalition
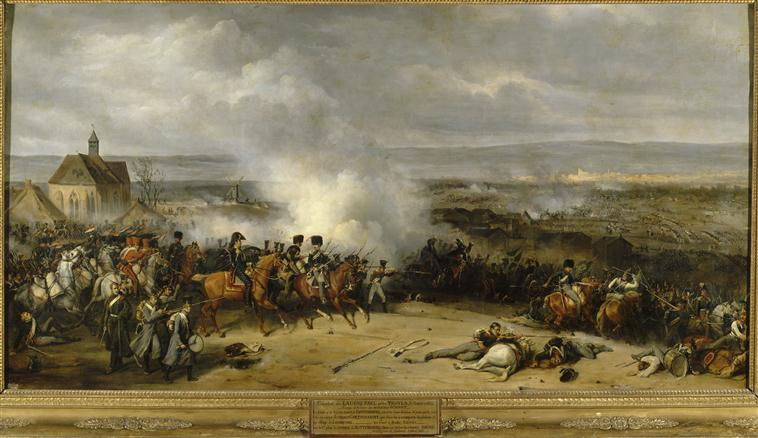
- The battle of Laubressel, near Troyes
Date	3 March 1814
Location	Laubressel, French Empire 48°17′59″N 4°12′46″E
Result	Coalition victory

Belligerents
(First French Empire) France	(Austrian Empire) Austria (Kingdom of Bavaria) Bavaria (Russian Empire) Russia (Kingdom of Württemberg) Württemberg

Commanders and leaders
(First French Empire) Jacques MacDonald (First French Empire) Nicolas Oudinot	(Austrian Empire) Karl von Schwarzenberg (Kingdom of Bavaria) Karl Philipp von Wrede (Russian Empire) Peter Wittgenstein (Kingdom of Württemberg) Prince of Württemberg

Strength
20,000	32,000 (Note: Only engaged troops.)

Casualties and losses
3,000 killed, wounded, or captured 7–11 guns lost	1,000–1,500 killed, wounded, or captured
- Location within France

War of the Sixth Coalition:
Campaign in north-east France
current battle
Napoleon in command
Napoleon not in command

The Battle of Laubressel (3 March 1814) saw the main Allied army of Field Marshal Karl Philipp, Prince of Schwarzenberg mount a three-pronged converging attack on the weaker army of Marshal Jacques MacDonald. The French forces under Marshal Nicolas Oudinot bore the brunt of the fighting, in which the Allies tried to turn their left flank. The French abandoned Troyes and retreated west as a result of the action. The village of Laubressel is located 10 kilometres (6 mi) east of Troyes.

After the French victory at the Battle of Montereau on 18 February, Schwarzenberg's army withdrew behind the river Aube. When Napoleon moved north against Gebhard Leberecht von Blücher's Army of Silesia, he left MacDonald and Oudinot to watch Schwarzenberg's army. After beating Oudinot at the Battle of Bar-sur-Aube, the Allies pressed the French back toward Troyes. At Laubressel, the Allies overpowered Oudinot's left wing. The Allies slowly pursued MacDonald's army, pressing it back to Provins before news of a victory by Napoleon brought Schwarzenberg's advance to a halt.

== Background ==
=== French advance ===
On 18 February 1814, Napoleon defeated Crown Prince Fredrick William of Württemberg in the Battle of Montereau. After this setback the Austrian general Karl Philipp, Prince of Schwarzenberg ordered the Army of Bohemia to retreat to Troyes. Schwarzenberg also asked his ally Gebhard Leberecht von Blücher to support his northern flank at Méry-sur-Seine and the Prussian general immediately complied. The Austrian intended to fight a battle on 21–22 February near Troyes. However, bad news from his commander in the south, Prince Frederick VI of Hesse-Homburg soon changed his mind. Marshal Pierre Augereau threatened to recapture Chalon-sur-Saône while Jean Gabriel Marchand menaced Geneva. Schwarzenberg ordered Vincenzo Federico Bianchi to take the Austrian I Corps and a reserve division and march to Dijon where they would join Hesse-Homburg's command.

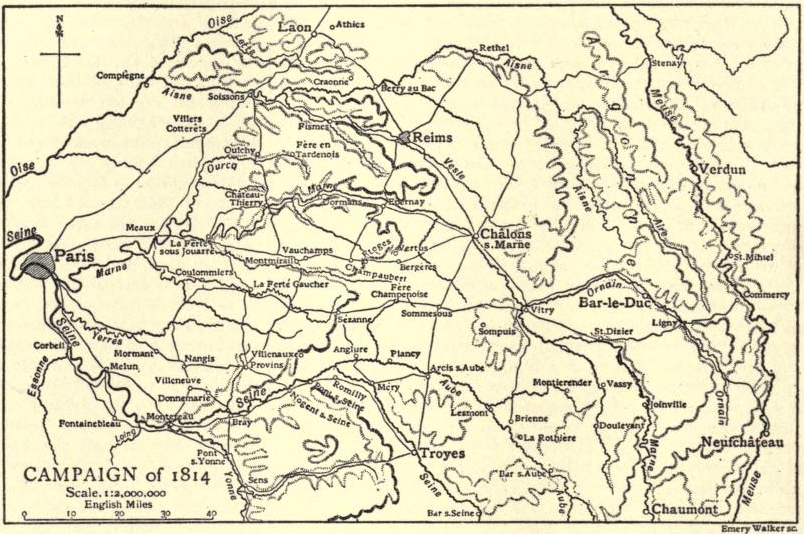
Campaign of 1814 map shows Troyes at the lower center.

At Troyes, Schwarzenberg's 90,000 troops and Blücher's 50,000 faced about 75,000 soldiers under Napoleon. Though he outnumbered the French emperor by nearly two-to-one, Schwarzenberg's intelligence services consistently overestimated enemy strength. His troops had worn-out uniforms and were short of food in an area that had been stripped of supplies by both armies. On 22 February the French probed the Allied positions from Méry to Troyes. Marshal Nicolas Oudinot's infantry cleared Méry of Allied troops and gained a foothold on the far bank, but they could not hold it against Allied counterattacks. In this clash, 3,600 men from Pierre François Joseph Boyer's division fought against 5,000 Russians from Alexei Grigorievich Scherbatov's VI Infantry Corps of Fabian Wilhelm von Osten-Sacken's command and 1,200 Prussians from Ludwig Yorck von Wartenburg's I Corps. That night Schwarzenberg directed his army to withdraw behind the river Seine, except for Ignaz Gyulai's III Corps, which would move southeast to Bar-sur-Seine.

Disappointed that his Austrian colleague refused to give battle, Blücher asked for and received permission to operate independently. He hoped to rendezvous with two corps under Ferdinand von Wintzingerode and Friedrich Wilhelm Freiherr von Bülow, and thus reinforced, advance on Paris by a more northerly route. Meanwhile, on 23 February Schwarzenberg's army fell back eastward covered by a rearguard under the Bavarian general Karl Philipp von Wrede. The Allies sent an emissary to Napoleon to propose a truce, but nothing came of this effort when the emperor's conditions proved unacceptable. Near Troyes, the 1,290 horsemen of Auguste Jean Ameil's 12th Light Cavalry Brigade and the 21st and 26th Dragoons clashed with Moritz von Liechtenstein's Austrian 2nd Light Division. The Austrian cavalry lost 311 men and three of their jäger companies were captured.

In its withdrawal, Schwarzenberg's main body passed through Vendœuvres while other columns went via Piney on the north and Bar-sur-Seine on the south. In pursuit, Napoleon sent Étienne Maurice Gérard and the II Corps toward Vendœuvres and Marshal Jacques MacDonald and the XI Corps to Bar-sur-Seine. The French emperor held his reserves near Troyes so that he might react to Blücher's moves. On 26 February, Oudinot's troops occupied Bar-sur-Aube while MacDonald moved southeast to seize Mussy-sur-Seine. The next morning, Napoleon finally received reports that Blücher's army was advancing on Paris and had gained a 3-day head start.

=== Allied counteroffensive ===
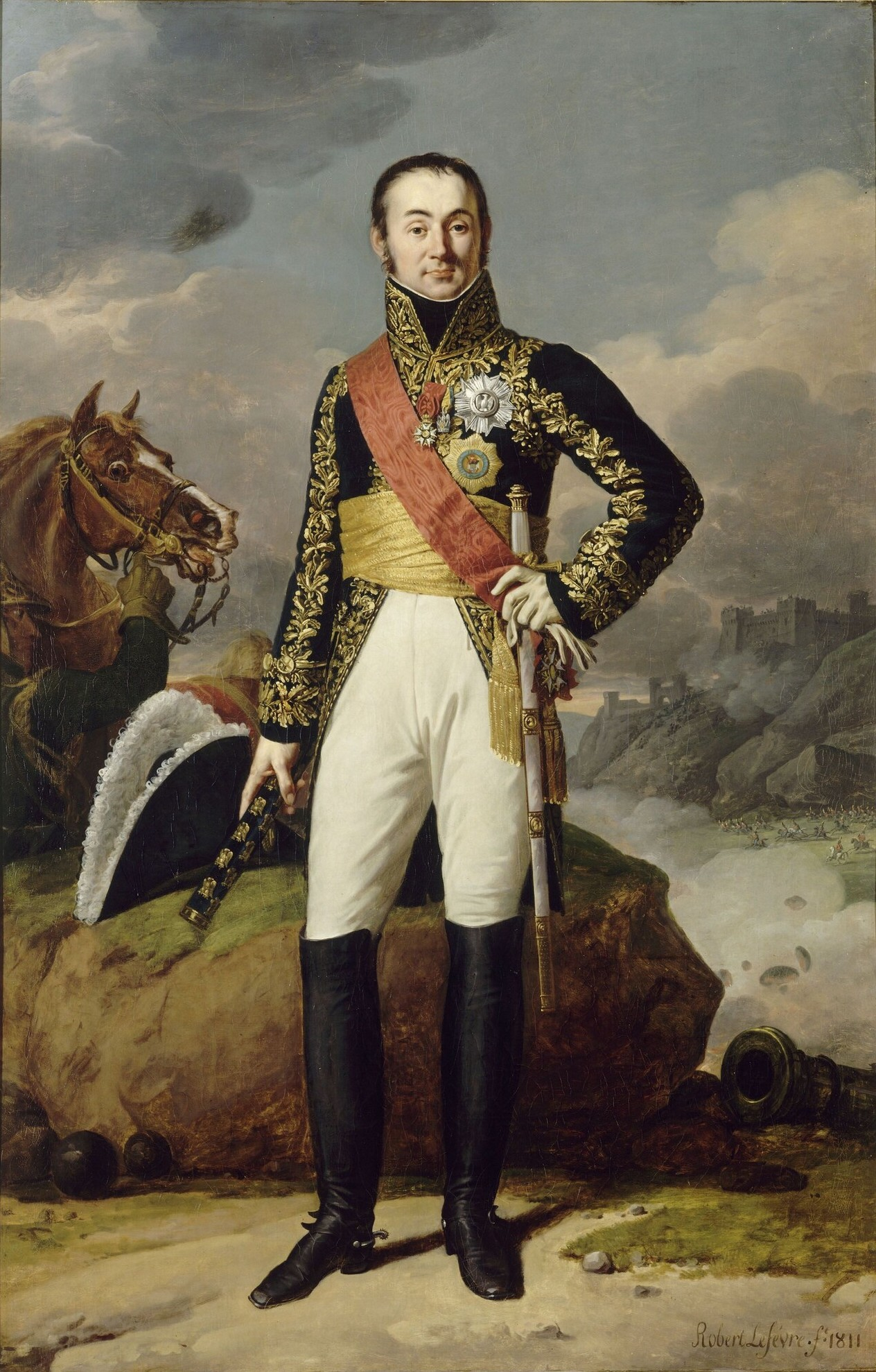
Nicolas Oudinot

Napoleon ordered MacDonald to take command of 42,000 troops opposing Schwarzenberg by defending behind the Aube. MacDonald would have the II, XI and VII Corps and the II Cavalry, V Cavalry and VI Cavalry Corps. Marshals Auguste de Marmont and Édouard Mortier had 10,000 men facing Blücher near Meaux. Napoleon took 35,000 troops and began marching northeast against Blücher's rear. Measures were taken to hide the fact that Napoleon was no longer facing Schwarzenberg's army.

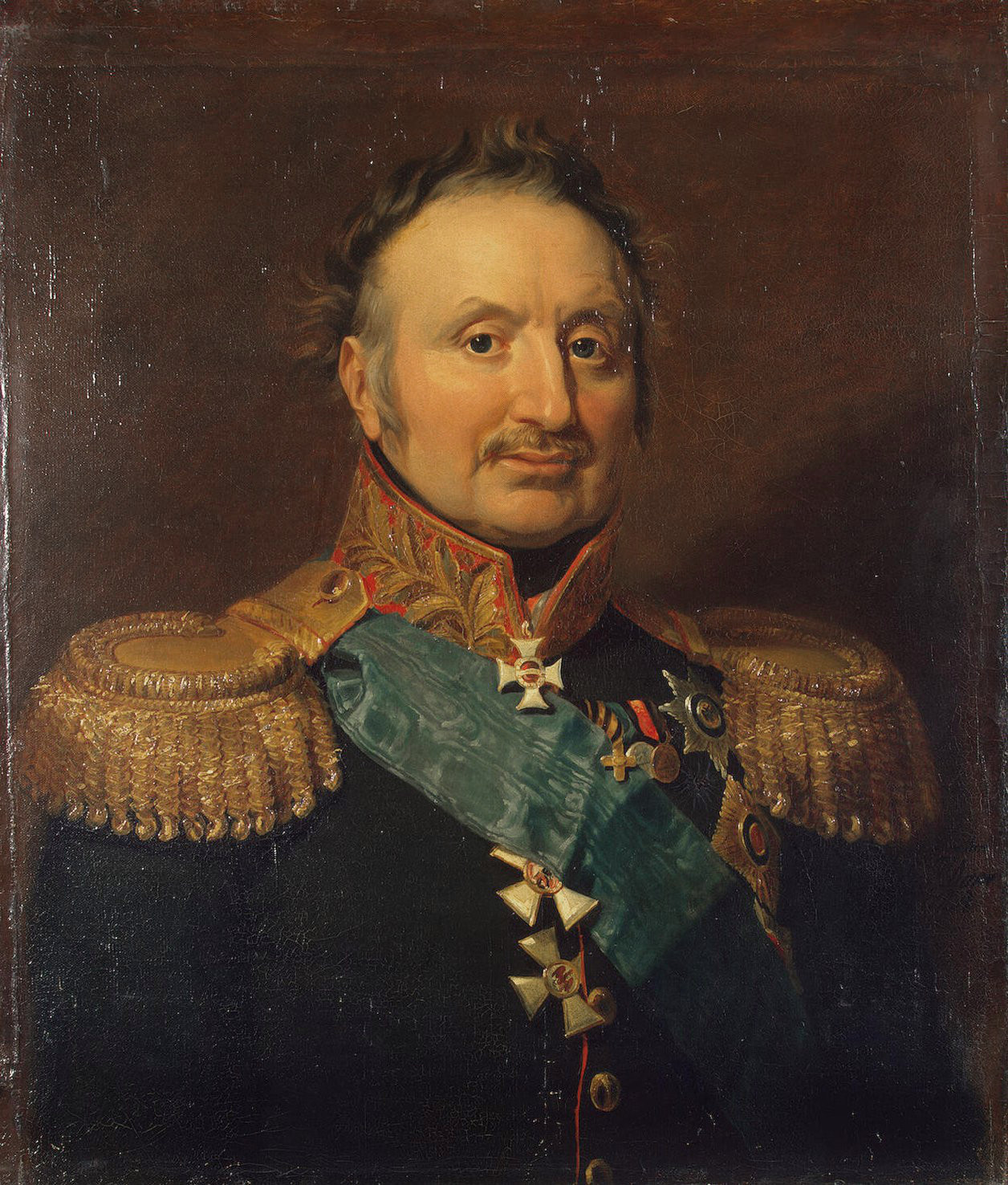
Peter Wittgenstein

The Austrian commander quickly guessed that Napoleon was not in front of him. On 27 February, Schwarzenberg defeated Oudinot in the Battle of Bar-sur-Aube when the French marshal deployed his troops in an exposed position on the east bank of the Aube. Though Oudinot was slightly superior in numbers, he was caught with most of his artillery and half his cavalry on the west bank of the river and brought only 18,000 troops into action, suffering 3,500 casualties. Another authority stated that the French lost 2,600 killed and wounded and 500 men and two guns captured. The Allies sustained 1,250 Russian, 400 Bavarian and 250 Austrian casualties.

The day after his defeat, Oudinot withdrew his troops to Vendœuvres, weakly pursued by the Allies. Unaware of Oudinot's setback, MacDonald advanced to Laferté-sur-Aube where the Allies had destroyed the bridge. On 28 February soldiers from Gyulai's corps attacked Michel Sylvestre Brayer's division at Silvarouvres, seizing the bridge there. MacDonald abandoned Laferté-sur-Aube and began pulling back to Bar-sur-Seine. Casualties were about 600 men on each side. On 1 March the Allies sent out two reconnaissance forces under Johann Maria Philipp Frimont and Peter Petrovich Pahlen. Frimont occupied Vendœuvres after some skirmishing with Gérard, while Pahlen operated on Frimont's right.

Feeling less anxious about his enemies, Schwarzenberg ordered an advance on Troyes for 2 March. That day, finding Gérard's troops holding the Guillotière Bridge, Pahlen moved north through the villages of Mesnil-Saint-Père and Géraudot to reach Dosches. His probes in the direction of Laubressel were chased off by French forces. Peter von Wittgenstein's Russian corps occupied Piney while Wrede's Bavarian-Austrian corps spent the night near Vendœuvres. On the southern flank the corps of Crown Prince of Württemberg and Gyulai pursued MacDonald's forces. They drove Brayer's division from Bar-sur-Seine at a cost of 500 Allied and 100 French casualties. Brayer fell back to join XI Corps.

== Battle ==
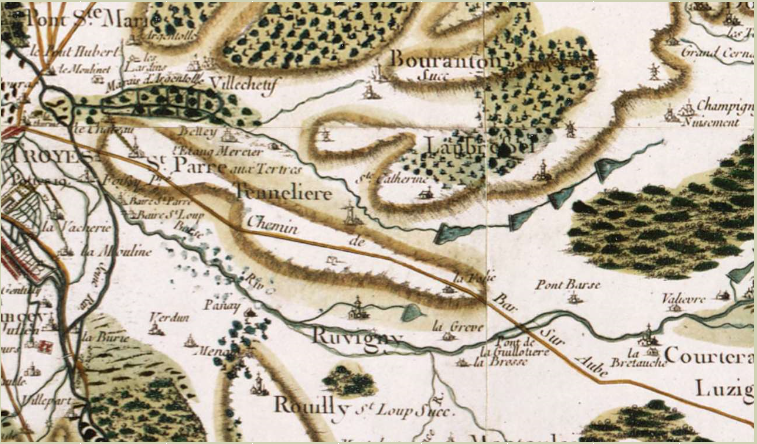
Cassini map shows the city of Troyes at the left, the village of Laubressel on a wooded height at right center and the Pont de la Guillotière where the road crosses the river Barce.

On 3 March at 1:00 pm, Schwarzenberg planned to launch a major attack on his adversaries from three sides. He ordered Wrede's corps to attack west down the highway from Vendœuvres to Troyes and to occupy the Courteranges Woods. Wittgenstein was directed to move southwest from Piney and to meet Wrede's forces near Laubressel. The Crown Prince and Gyulai were instructed to press to the northwest from Bar-sur-Seine. To oppose the Allies, Oudinot ordered Guillaume Philibert Duhesme's division to defend the Guillotière Bridge. Henri Rottembourg's division was posted on the Laubressel plateau. The 2nd Division of II Corps linked the positions of Duhesme and Rottembourg, with Antoine Anatole Jarry's brigade on Duhesme's left. Oudinot's VII Corps and François Etienne de Kellermann's VI Cavalry Corps were to the northwest guarding the Saint-Hubert Bridge on the Seine. Closer at hand, Antoine-Louis Decrest de Saint-Germain's II Cavalry Corps was positioned at Saint-Parres-aux-Tertres. The XI Corps under Gabriel Jean Joseph Molitor was near Saint-Parres-lès-Vaudes on the west bank of the Seine southeast of Troyes. Also to the south was Édouard Jean Baptiste Milhaud's V Cavalry Corps with outposts in Rumilly-lès-Vaudes and Fouchères

In the morning, Wrede's corps was led by Anton von Rechberg's Bavarian division and Anton Leonhard von Hardegg's Austrian division. The rest of his troops were at Vendœuvres with orders to move through Montiéramey. Wittgenstein's infantry began marching from Piney toward Laubressel, via the villages of Rouilly-Sacey and Mesnil-Sellières. They were preceded by Pahlen's advanced guard which quickly bumped into Rottembourg's French troops. Pahlen's infantry, supported by one cuirassier, one uhlan and one hussar regiment plus four field guns, began skirmishing with Rottembourg's troops. The rest of his cavalry circled to the north through Bouranton in an attempt to envelop the French left flank. Pahlen's cavalry reached the unguarded village of Thennelières in the French rear where it attacked a weakly escorted artillery park. Saint-Germain's cavalry appeared and recaptured most of the park but not before the Russian horsemen carried off 200 prisoners. Saint-Germain pushed Pahlen's cavalry back beyond Bouranton. Kellermann's corps moved up to Saint-Parres-aux-Tertres to replace the II Cavalry Corps.

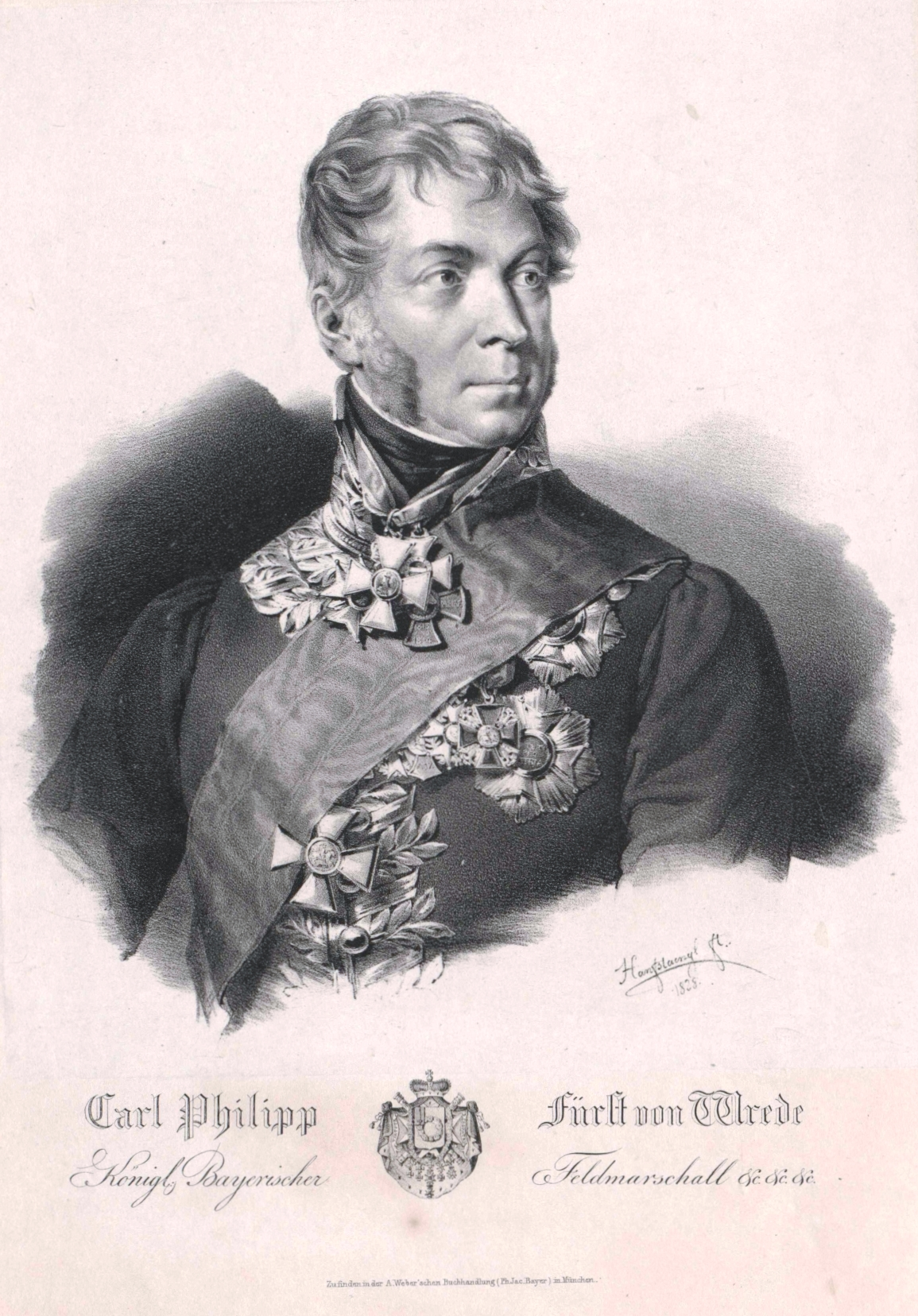
Karl Philipp von Wrede

At 3:00 pm Wittgenstein launched a two-pronged attack after he heard Wrede's guns begin bombarding the French positions. On the right, Duke Eugen of Württemberg led the Russian II Infantry Corps against Bouranton while on the left Andrei Ivanovich Gorchakov led the I Infantry Corps against Laubressel. The attack consisted of battalion columns led by skirmishers and well-supported by artillery. Eugen's 3rd Division easily took Bouranton and moved toward Thennelière, only to be counterattacked by Kellermann's cavalry, which had joined the fighting. Eugen's 4th Division had difficulty fighting its way up the vineyard-covered Laubressel slopes. After reaching the crest, the 4th Division had to withstand attacks by Saint-Germain's cavalry. Rottembourg's infantry were only supported by six artillery pieces and suffered losses from the 32 Russian field guns deployed against them.

Wrede sent four or five Bavarian battalions across the Barce near Courteranges. They moved through the woods to link up with Wittgenstein's Russians. With the Russians pushing Rottembourg off the Laubressel plateau, Oudinot issued orders to retreat. Gorchakov's advance had been slowed by the presence of 20 French cavalry squadrons, but now the Russian Kaluga Regiment launched an assault without orders. With King Frederick William III of Prussia watching, they took the heights in a rush. At the same time Antoine Alexandre de Bélair's brigade of the II Corps 2nd Division was hit by two Russian regiments in front and two more from the flank. Bélair's brigade dissolved and fled to the rear.

Seeing his flank turned, Gérard gave instructions for a retreat. Apparently Jarry was acting commander of the II Corps 2nd Division, because he and Rottembourg joined their divisions and made an orderly withdrawal after abandoning Laubressel. Their movement was supported by cavalry and artillery. Wrede chose this moment to directly assault the Guillotière Bridge with four Bavarian battalions while shifting other troops to his left. In the confusion, Duhesme missed the first orders to pull back and was nearly surrounded by enemies when Gérard sent them a second time. Hounded by the Austrian Knesevich Dragoons Nr. 3 and the Szekler Hussars Nr. 11, Duhesme's troops nevertheless fought their way back to Saint-Parres-aux-Tertres after suffering 400 casualties and losing two guns. The Crown Prince remained inactive on the left, allowing Molitor's XI Corps and Milhaud's cavalry to fall back without interference.

== Results ==
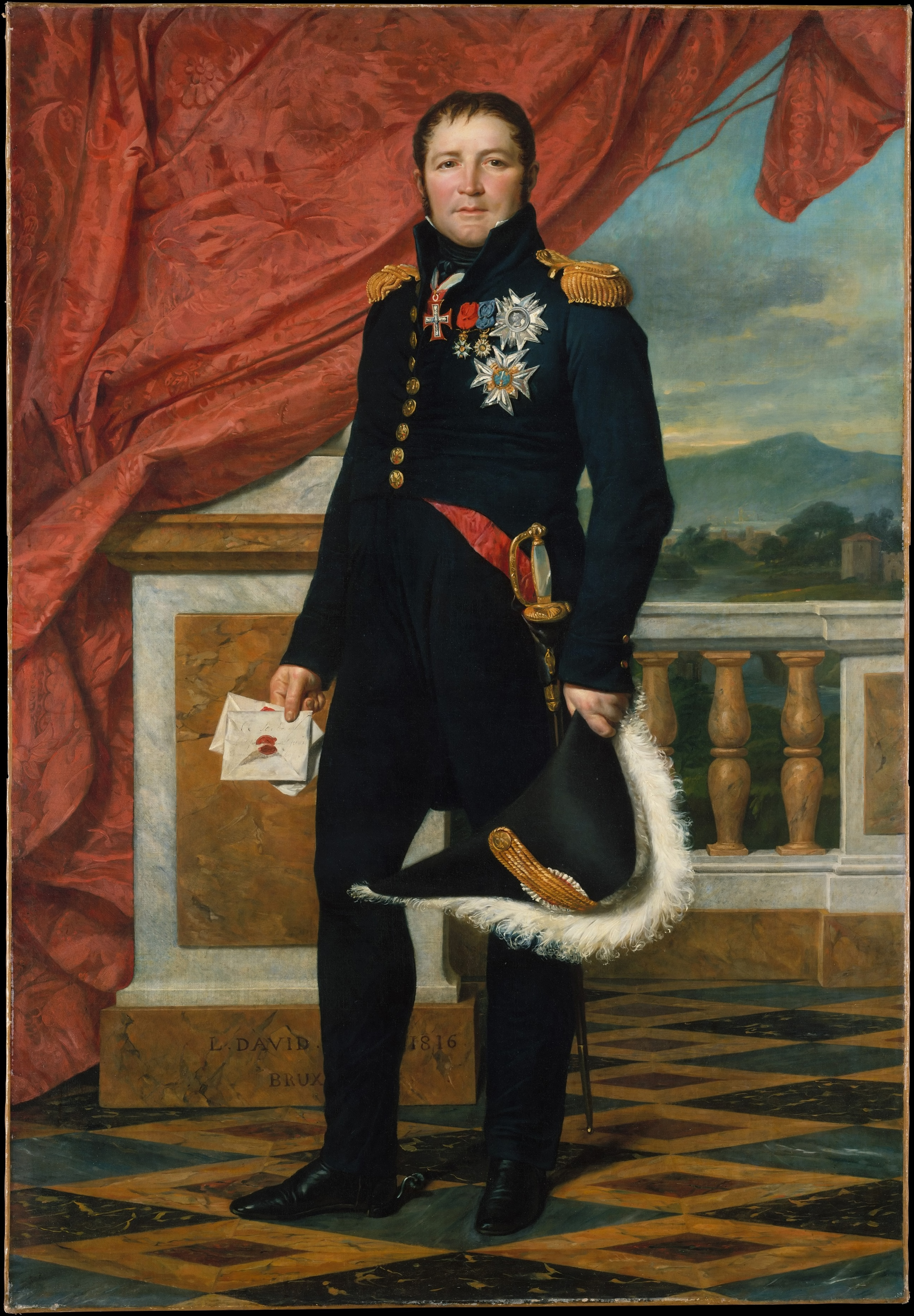
Portrait of Étienne Maurice Gérard by Jacques-Louis David, 1816

One source gave French losses as 2,600 killed and wounded and 460 captured while the Russians lost 1,200 and the Bavarians 300. Another source stated the Allies captured 1,500 French soldiers and seven guns, while sustaining about 1,000 casualties. A third source estimated that the French lost 1,000 killed and wounded plus 2,000 soldiers and 11 guns captured out of 20,000 troops engaged. The Allies lost 1,000 killed and wounded out of 32,000 troops engaged. MacDonald, who was sick, had only 21,000 infantry and 4,000 cavalry to face the much larger Allied army. He determined to retreat in a deliberate manner so that his wagon trains could keep up.

Anxious that Napoleon might suddenly show up, Schwarzenberg ordered Wittgenstein and Wrede to attack the city at once. Gérard held out on the east bank of the Seine until 11:00 am when he withdrew into Troyes. The Allies fought their way into the suburbs but were stopped at the city walls. They brought up howitzers and began shelling Troyes. During a lull in the bombardment the French garrison slipped out and joined MacDonald's retreating army. Oudinot did not think a strong rearguard was needed in La Chapelle-Saint-Luc. Consequently, the Bavarian cavalry suddenly appeared behind Kellermann's cavalry, throwing it into panic. Luckily for the French, when VI Cavalry Corps stampeded their infantry held steady, but 400 prisoners were swept up by the Allies.

In Troyes, the Allies went on a 2-day orgy of pillage and violence. After they recovered from this, Wittgenstein and Wrede headed out after the French while the Crown Prince and Gyulai advanced toward Sens. Schwarzenberg himself stayed in Troyes until 12 March. By 16 March the Allies had pushed MacDonald's army back to Provins. That day Schwarzenberg found out about Napoleon's victory at the Battle of Reims and the French capture of Châlons-sur-Marne and his advance stopped.

== Forces ==
=== French order of battle ===
MacDonald's Army before Troyes
Corps	Division	Inf/Cav (Sporschil)	Inf/Cav (Fr. Archives)	Gunners (Fr. Arch.)	Guns (Fr. Arch.)
II Corps: Étienne Maurice Gérard	Guillaume Philibert Duhesme	1,970	1,883	128	6
II Corps: Étienne Maurice Gérard	Jacques Félix de La Hamelinaye	1,800	1,027	134	6
II Corps: Étienne Maurice Gérard	Corps Artillery	-	-	476	11
VII Corps: Nicolas Oudinot	Henri Rottembourg	2,628	2,496	129	8
VII Corps: Nicolas Oudinot	Jean François Leval	4,365	4,021	249	?
VII Corps: Nicolas Oudinot	David Hendrik Chassé	2,515	2,215	265	12
VII Corps: Nicolas Oudinot	Michel-Marie Pacthod	4,027	4,027	177	6
VII Corps: Nicolas Oudinot	Corps Artillery	-	-	304	18
XI Corps: Gabriel Jean Joseph Molitor	Joseph Jean Baptiste Albert	1,520	3,357	321	-
XI Corps: Gabriel Jean Joseph Molitor	Michel Sylvestre Brayer	1,370	2,134	264	-
XI Corps: Gabriel Jean Joseph Molitor	François Pierre Joseph Amey	2,681	772	70	-
XI Corps: Gabriel Jean Joseph Molitor	Corps Cavalry: 13th Hussars	-	301	-	-
XI Corps: Gabriel Jean Joseph Molitor	Corps Artillery	-	-	1,305 (Note: This total may include gunners attached to the divisions.)	48
II Cavalry Corps: Antoine-Louis de Saint-Germain	Antoine Maurin	1,325	1,082	106	4
II Cavalry Corps: Antoine-Louis de Saint-Germain	Jacques-Antoine-Adrien Delort	1,270	704	143	6
V Cavalry Corps: Édouard Jean Baptiste Milhaud	Hippolyte Piré	1,421	1,421	-	-
V Cavalry Corps: Édouard Jean Baptiste Milhaud	André Briche	1,700	1,700	-	-
V Cavalry Corps: Édouard Jean Baptiste Milhaud	Samuel-François Lhéritier	1,269	1,269	-	-
V Cavalry Corps: Édouard Jean Baptiste Milhaud	Corps Artillery	-	-	265	14
VI Cavalry Corps: François Etienne de Kellermann	Charles Claude Jacquinot	1,258	1,665	-	-
VI Cavalry Corps: François Etienne de Kellermann	Anne-François-Charles Trelliard	1,747	2,028	195	6

=== Coalition order of battle ===
Schwarzenberg's Army
Corps	Division	Guns
III Corps: Ignaz Gyulai; 10,000	1st Division: Louis Charles Folliot de Crenneville	6
III Corps: Ignaz Gyulai; 10,000	2nd Division: Johann Karl Hennequin de Fresnel	16
III Corps: Ignaz Gyulai; 10,000	3rd Division: Prince Louis of Hohenlohe-Bartenstein	16
III Corps: Ignaz Gyulai; 10,000	Corps Artillery	18
IV Corps: Crown Prince of Württemberg; 15,000	Cavalry Division: Prince Adam of Württemberg	12
IV Corps: Crown Prince of Württemberg; 15,000	1st Division: Christian Gottgetreu von Koch	12
IV Corps: Crown Prince of Württemberg; 15,000	2nd Division: Christoph Friedrich von Döring	12
IV Corps: Crown Prince of Württemberg; 15,000	Corps Artillery	6
V Corps: Karl Philipp von Wrede; 20,000	1st Bavarian Division: Anton von Rechberg	14
V Corps: Karl Philipp von Wrede; 20,000	2nd Bavarian Division: Karl von Becker	14
V Corps: Karl Philipp von Wrede; 20,000	3rd Bavarian Division: Peter de Lamotte	14
V Corps: Karl Philipp von Wrede; 20,000	1st Austrian Division: Anton Leonhard von Hardegg	6
V Corps: Karl Philipp von Wrede; 20,000	2nd Austrian Division: Ignaz Splény de Miháldi	18
V Corps: Karl Philipp von Wrede; 20,000	Corps Artillery	38
VI Corps: Peter Wittgenstein; 14,000	I Infantry Corps: Andrei Ivanovich Gorchakov	36
VI Corps: Peter Wittgenstein; 14,000	II Infantry Corps: Duke Eugen of Württemberg	36
VI Corps: Peter Wittgenstein; 14,000	Cavalry Corps: Peter Petrovich Pahlen	-
VI Corps: Peter Wittgenstein; 14,000	Corps Artillery	24

== Notes ==
Footnotes

Citations
