= Henri Rottembourg =

French general (1768-1857)

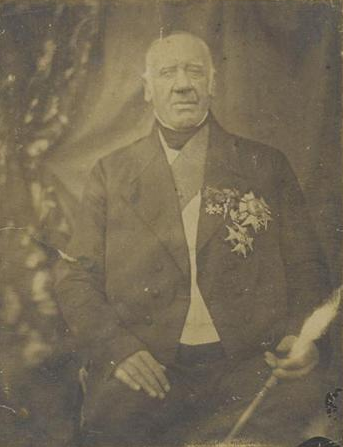
- General Henri Rottembourg pictured in 1855
- Born: 6 July 1769; Phalsbourg, Lorraine, France
- Died: 8 February 1857 (aged 87); Montgeron, Essonne, France
- Military career
- Allegiance: France
- Branch: Infantry
- Service years: (Kingdom of France) 1784–1792, 1815–1830 (France) 1792–1815, 1830–1834
- Rank: General of Division
- Conflicts: War of the First Coalition; War of the Second Coalition; Battle of Verona; Battle of Pozzolo; War of the Fourth Coalition; Battle of Jena; War of the Fifth Coalition; Battle of Eckmühl; Battle of Wagram; War of the Sixth Coalition; French invasion of Russia; Battle of Bautzen; Battle of Leipzig; Battle of La Rothière; Battle of Mormant; Battle of Bar-sur-Aube; Battle of Laubressel; Hundred Days; Battle of La Suffel
- Awards: Légion d'Honneur, GC 1828; Order of Saint Louis, CC 1825
- Other work: Baron of the Empire, 1809

Baron Henri Rottembourg (English: /ˈrɒtɑːmbʊər/ ROT-ahm-boor, French: [ɑ̃ʁi ʁɔtɑ̃buʁ]; 6 July 1769 – 8 February 1857) was a French army general who was a division commander late in the Napoleonic Wars. He enlisted in an infantry regiment of the French Royal Army in 1784 and was promoted to first lieutenant by 1792. During the War of the First Coalition from 1793 to 1797 he fought mostly in the Army of Sambre-et-Meuse. He was wounded at Verona in 1799 and fought on the Var and at the Mincio in 1800. He transferred to the Imperial Guard in 1806 before fighting at Jena and being named to command an infantry regiment. In 1809 he was wounded at Wagram.

In 1811, Rottembourg was promoted to general of brigade and fought in the French invasion of Russia in 1812 before being sent home to organize units of the Imperial Guard. In 1813, he led a Young Guard brigade at Bautzen and an Old Guard brigade at Leipzig. Late that year he became a general of division. In 1814, he led a Young Guard division at La Rothière, Mormant, Second Bar-sur-Aube and Laubressel. During the Hundred Days he led troops at La Suffel. During the Bourbon Restoration he held several interior posts and was awarded the Grand Cross of the Legion of Honor. He retired from the army in 1834. His surname is one of the names inscribed under the Arc de Triomphe, on Column 10.

== Early career ==
Rottembourg was born on 6 July 1769 in Phalsbourg in what later became the Meurthe department and is currently in the Moselle department. On 16 September 1784 he enlisted in the 84th Infantry Regiment as a private. He became a corporal on 1 January 1791. In the year 1792 he was promoted sergeant on 1 May, adjutant-sous-officer on 26 August, sous-lieutenant on 1 September and lieutenant on 15 October. In 1792–94 he fought with the Army of the Centre, Army of the North and Army of the Ardennes. On 21 November 1794 he was elevated to the rank of captain adjutant-major in the 172nd Demi-brigade. This unit later became the 99th and finally the 62nd Demi-brigade.

From 1794 to 1801 Rottembourg served with the Armies of Sambre-et-Meuse, Mayence, England and Italy. On 26 March 1799 he was hit by a musket ball in the right thigh while leading skirmishers at the Battle of Verona. He distinguished himself under Louis-Gabriel Suchet in the retreat to the Var River in April and May 1800, winning promotion to major (chef de bataillon) on 28 August 1800. The 62nd Demi-brigade fought at Mount Settepani on 10–11 April 1800. There were a number of clashes on the Var on 22–27 May between Suchet's corps and the Austrians. On 25 December 1800, he led his troops in a successful bayonet charge during the Battle of Pozzolo. The next day he took a prominent part in the capture of Borghetto, near Valeggio sul Mincio.

== Empire ==
=== Early empire ===
On 22 December 1803, Rottembourg transferred to the 56th Line Infantry Regiment as a major and on 25 March 1804 became a member of the Legion of Honor. On 1 May 1806 he transferred to the Foot Chasseurs of the Imperial Guard. For his actions at the Battle of Jena, he was promoted colonel of the 108th Line Infantry Regiment on 20 October 1806. The regiment fought at the Battle of Eylau on 7–8 February 1807. Rottembourg was awarded the officer's cross of the Legion of Honor on 7 July 1807.

During the War of the Fifth Coalition Rottembourg led the 108th Line in Louis Friant's 2nd Division in Marshal Louis-Nicolas Davout's III Corps. The regiment started the campaign with 2,189 men in three battalions. Friant's division took part in the Battle of Eckmühl on 21–22 April 1809. The 108th Line also fought at the Battle of Wagram on 5–6 July. By that time the regiment's strength was reduced to 1,724 men. On the second day, while some of Davout's divisions assaulted Markgrafneusiedl, Friant's division and its supporting cavalry advanced to the north of the village. After bitter fighting the Austrians were compelled to retreat. Rottembourg was wounded on 6 July. He became a Baron of the Empire on 20 August 1809 and received promotion to general of brigade on 21 July 1811.

=== War of the Sixth Coalition ===
Rottembourg served as an adjutant general in the Imperial Guard during the French invasion of Russia in 1812, but was sent back to France to organize part of the Imperial Guard. He performed this task with such success that he was awarded the Commander's Cross of the Legion of Honor on 13 May 1813. At the Battle of Bautzen on 20–21 May 1813, Rottembourg commanded a brigade in Pierre Barrois' 2nd Young Guard Division. The brigade included two battalions each of the 1st and 2nd Tirailleur Regiments. The 1st Tirailleurs numbered 27 officers and 1,031 rank and file. During the early fighting on 21 May, Barrois' division was ordered to support the attack of Marshal Auguste de Marmont's corps in the center. Late in the afternoon, the massed divisions of the Imperial Guard were used to break the Allies' resistance.

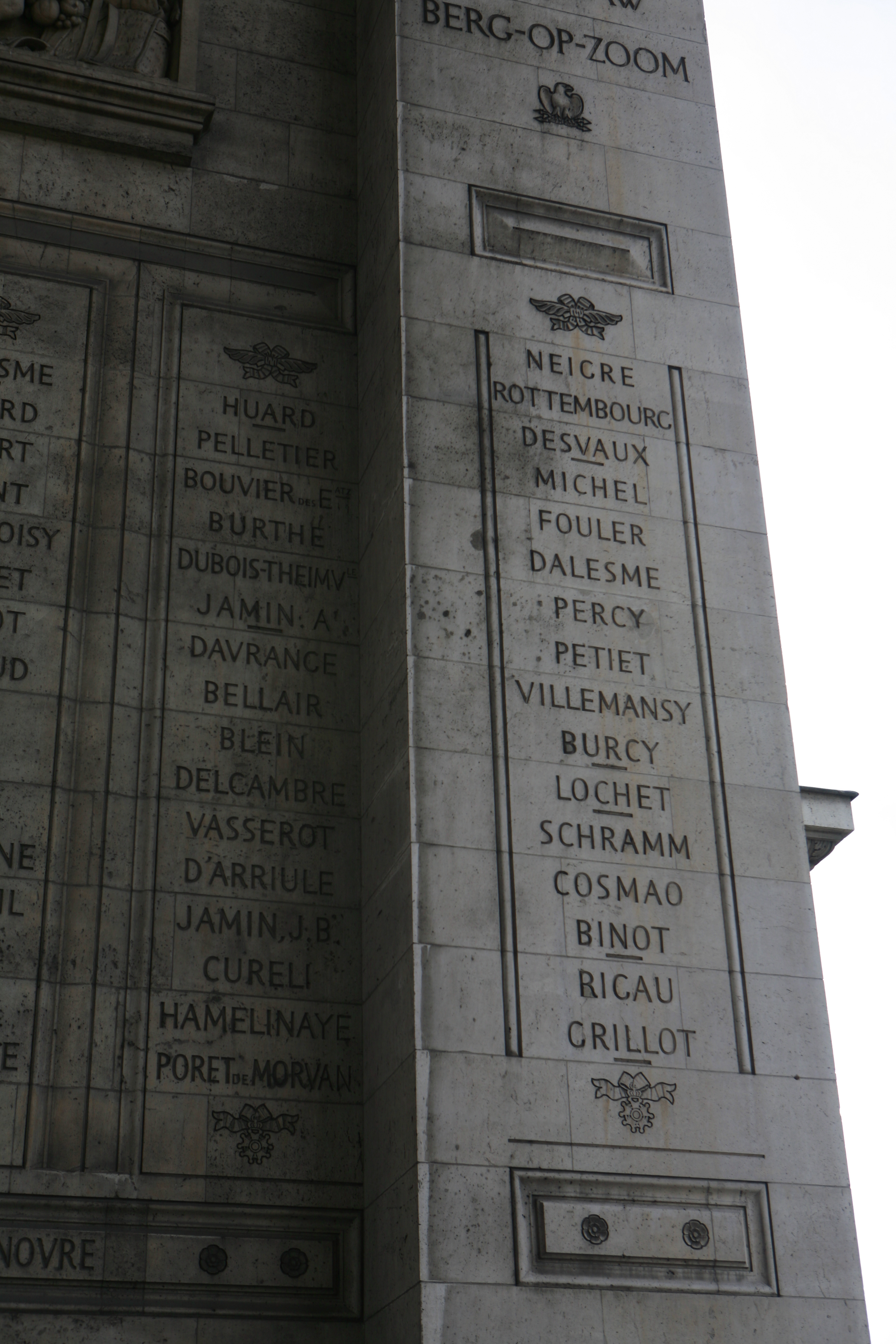
Rottembourg is the second name under Column 10 of the Arc de Triomphe.

At the Battle of Leipzig on 16–19 October 1813, Rottembourg led a brigade in Philibert Jean-Baptiste Curial's 4,664-strong 2nd Old Guard Division. The brigade was made up of the 1st Battalion of the Saxon Guard Regiment, the Polish Guard Battalion and the 2nd Battalion of the Westphalian Guard Fusilier Regiment. The Westphalians were detached to escort the Guard artillery park. On the 16 October, the French launched a counterattack against the Allied Army of Bohemia. It drove back the Allies but failed to secure a decisive victory. Late in the afternoon, one division of the Old Guard was committed to action to drive the Austrians out of Dölitz. The Old Guard saw action on 18 October in heavy fighting to the northeast of Leipzig near Paunsdorf. Rottembourg was promoted general of division on 20 November 1813.

At the beginning of January 1814, Rottembourg's division was organized into two brigades under Jean-Joseph Marguet and Jean-Louis Charrière. On 26 January, Marshal Michel Ney was in command of the Young Guard infantry divisions of Rottembourg, Claude Marie Meunier and Pierre Decouz, plus Charles Lefebvre-Desnouettes' Guard cavalry division. In all, Ney led 14,505 soldiers. On 25 January, Rottembourg's 5th Young Guard (or 2nd Tirailleur) Division included the 1st and 2nd Battalions of the 1st, 5th, 6th, 7th and 8th Tirailleur Regiments. Each regiment was 800–1,000 men strong while the Flanker-Chasseur Regiment only counted 312 men. The two attached artillery companies had 342 gunners.

At the Battle of La Rothière on 1 February 1814, the Allies had 113,000 troops available, but only 85,000 and 200 guns were engaged thanks to Austrian Field Marshal Karl Philipp, Prince of Schwarzenberg's hesitancy. To oppose the Allies, Napoleon had only 45,100 men and 128 guns, but he sent away Ney's three infantry divisions that morning. Rottembourg's division was the only one immediately available for battle. In the evening, Napoleon ordered Marshal Nicolas Oudinot to recapture La Rothière using Rottembourg's division. Despite intense fire, the 1st Brigade drove Fabian Gottlieb von Osten-Sacken's Russians from the village, but the place was recaptured by Zakhar Dmitrievich Olsufiev's Russians. The 2nd Brigade stormed the village again, flushing out its defenders. However, on the other side, it encountered an Austrian brigade and a Russian grenadier division which recaptured the village again. At 8:00 pm, the division's survivors reformed 500 paces north of La Rothière, the scene lit only by burning houses. Rottembourg's 5,000 troops fought "spendidly" according to one author. Brigadier Marguet was killed in the battle.

Before embarking on the Six Days' Campaign against Gebhard Leberecht von Blücher's Allied army, Napoleon left Marshals Claude Perrin Victor, Jacques MacDonald and Oudinot to contain Schwarzenberg's army. Oudinot took command of the VII Corps, consisting of two infantry divisions of Peninsular War veterans and Rottembourg's division. At that time, Rottembourg was guarding the army's wagon train and artillery park. On 8 February, the division numbered 3,101 men while 1,020 of its men guarded the wagon train. At the Battle of Mormant on 17 February 1814, the front line consisted of Victor's corps and Étienne Maurice Gérard's Paris Reserve. In second line was Pierre François Xavier Boyer's division of VII Corps and 200 metres (219 yd) behind Boyer was Rottembourg's division. After a successful action, Oudinot's corps pursued to the east while other units moved southeast.

In the Battle of Bar-sur-Aube on 27 February 1814, Rottembourg's division was initially deployed in the second line and later fought on the left flank. A report of 1 March showed the division to have shrunken to 2,496 men. The 1st Brigade of Charrière (5th and 6th regiments) numbered 682 men while the 2nd Brigade (7th and 8th regiments) of Pierre François Bauduin counted 1,814. The 11th Young Guard Artillery Company with 75 gunners, six 6-pound cannons and two howitzers and the 9th Guard Train Company with 54 drivers were attached. At the Battle of Laubressel on 3 March, Rottembourg's division held the key village and plateau of Laubressel with 2,628 men. After a struggle against superior numbers, Rottembourg's division withdrew from Laubressel in good order.

== Later career ==
After the Bourbon Restoration, King Louis XVIII named Rottembourg a chevalier of the Order of Saint Louis and inspector general of infantry on 27 June 1814. He was made a Grand Officer of the Legion of Honor on 14 February 1815. After the return of Napoleon, he was appointed to command the 6th Division of the 2nd Corps of Observation on 30 April 1815. His command became part of the Army of the Rhine on 18 May. On 28 June he fought the Battle of La Suffel (Suffelweyersheim) against 7,700 Austrians, Württembergers and Hessians. His 15th Division consisted of two battalions each of the 36th, 39th, 40th and 103rd Line Infantry Regiments, the 2nd and 7th Horse Chasseurs and the 11th Dragoon Regiments and 12 artillery pieces. His 5,600 troops suffered about 700 killed and wounded and lost six guns and two colors. During the action, the Württemberg Duke Louis Mounted Jägers routed the 2nd Horse Chasseurs. Subsequently, the division, which was part of Jean Rapp's V Corps, retreated through Haguenau into Strasbourg.

Rottembourg was retired on 9 September 1815 but restored to his rank on 29 March 1816. He was appointed inspector general of infantry on 25 October 1817 and included in the active army general staff on 30 October 1818. He was named president of the committee of infantry on 7 November 1821 and assumed command of the Eastern Pyrenees Division on 12 February 1823. He was awarded the commander's cross of the Order of Saint Louis on 23 May 1825. King Charles X appointed Rottembourg head of the 16th Military Division at Lille and awarded him the Grand Cross of the Legion of Honor. He returned to the army general staff on 10 February 1831. He was assigned inspector general of infantry to the 11th and 20th Military Divisions on 5 July 1832 and commander of the 18th Military Division at Dijon on 1 December 1832. He retired from the service on 1 July 1834. He died on 8 February 1857 at Montgeron, France. ROTTEMBOURG is engraved on the north pillar of the Arc de Triomphe. He was the only Jewish general officer to serve in Napoleon's armies. These armies were made up of officers and men who often harbored anti-Semitic views.

== See also ==
- PB (2015). "Napoleon and the Jews: The Curate's Egg" (PDF). Westminster Quarterly. London: Westminster Synagogue.
