= Battle of Heilsberg =

1807 Battle during the War of the Fourth Coalition

- Part of the War of the Fourth Coalition
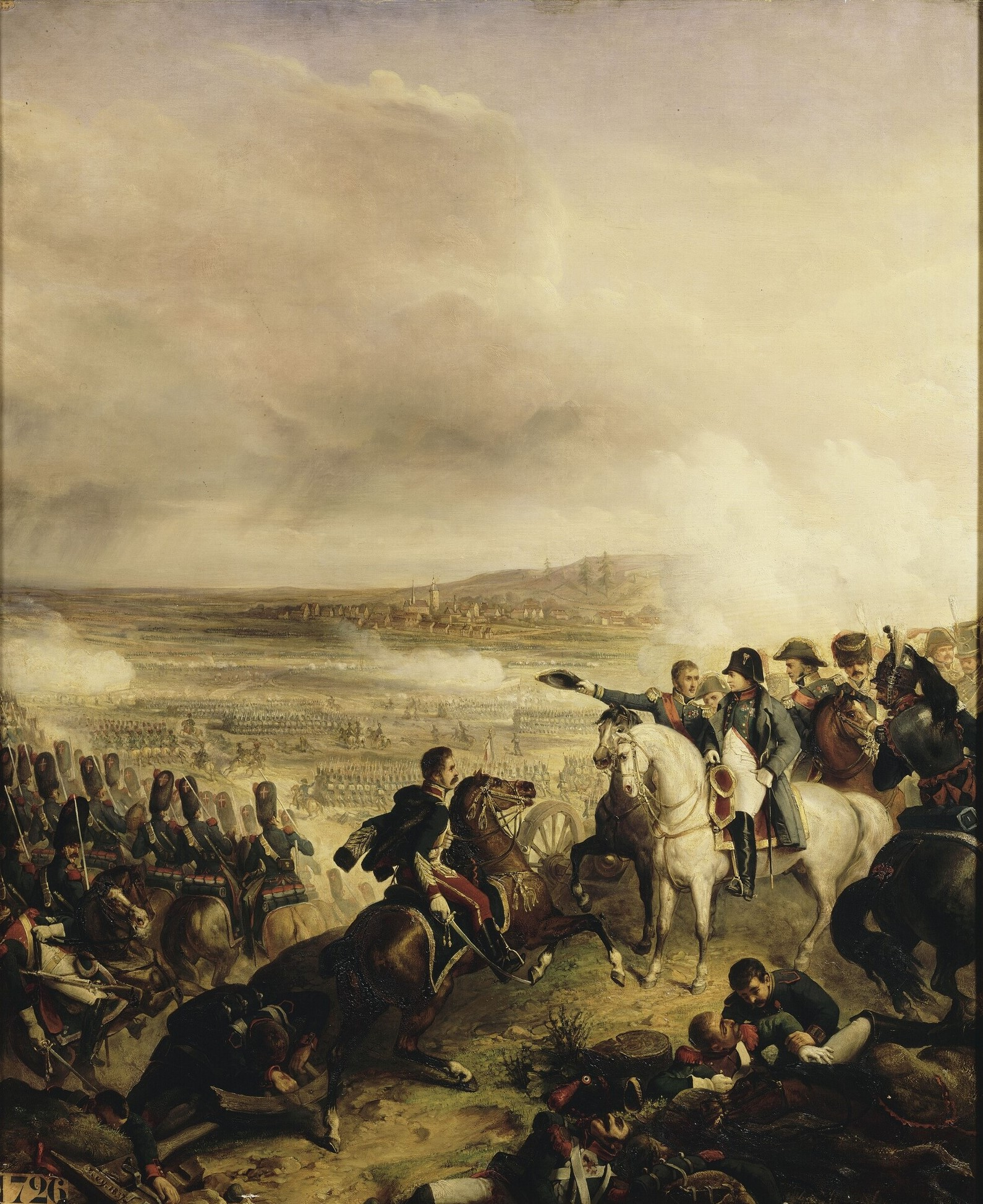
- Emperor Napoleon I on the battlefield of Heilsberg, on 11 June 1807 by Joseph Nicolas Jouy, 1837
| Date | 10 June 1807 |
| Location | Heilsberg, East Prussia (now Lidzbark Warmiński, Poland) 54°07′00″N 20°35′00″E |
| Result | Inconclusive |

Belligerents
| (France) French Empire | (Russia) Russian Empire; Kingdom of Prussia |

Commanders and leaders
| (France) Napoleon I (France) Joachim Murat (France) Jean Lannes (France) Claude Legrand (France) Saint-Hilaire (France) Jean-Antoine Verdier | (Russia) Leonty Bennigsen (Russia) Andrei Gorchakov (Russia) Pyotr Bagration (Russia) Constantine Pavlovich (Russia) Nikolay Kamensky |

Strength
| 50,000–64,500 overall around Heilsberg; 49,000 "came into battle" ~30,000 engaged | 90,000–95,000 overall around Heilsberg (including 3,000 Prussian cavalry); ~53,000 engaged |

Casualties and losses
| Versions: up to 8,000 casualties; (Note: Some French assessments); 1,398 killed, 10,059 wounded, 864 captured; 12,500 casualties, 3 eagles; up to 13,000 killed or wounded. (Note: Marshal Berthier's affirmation to Bennigsen (at the war's end)) | Versions: 6,000 killed or wounded; 2,000–3,000 killed and 5–6,000 wounded; 9,000 casualties; 3,000 killed and 7,000 wounded. |

War of the Fourth Coalition
⬤ current battle
⬤ Napoleon not in command
⬤ Napoleon in command

The Battle of Heilsberg took place on 10 June [O.S. 29 May] 1807 off the town of Heilsberg (now Lidzbark Warmiński), during the Napoleonic Wars. In it, Joachim Murat's French troops began the offensive on Leonty (Levin) Bennigsen's Russian force ahead of schedule. The opponents fought until nightfall, by which time the French attacks had produced no results. They concluded an operational armistice. Napoleon, French supreme commander, intended to bring up more forces and continue the encounter, but Bennigsen eluded this, heading towards Königsberg. Due to Bennigsen's illness, corps-level commander Andrei Gorchakov temporarily replaced him during the action until the very end of it. Napoleon also arrived on the battlefield, but it was Murat who initiated the battle.

== Overview ==
On 24 May 1807, the Siege of Danzig ended when Prussian General Friedrich Adolf, Count von Kalckreuth capitulated to French Marshal François Joseph Lefebvre. This gave Napoleon the opportunity to engage the Russian forces led by Levin August von Bennigsen (then Andrei Ivanovich Gorchakov). The French commanders were Joachim Murat and Napoleon Bonaparte. On 2 June, before Napoleon could act, Bennigsen ordered his columns to converge on Marshal Michel Ney's exposed VI Corps. Outnumbered by 63,000 to 17,000, Ney fought a rearguard action at the Battle of Guttstadt-Deppen on 5 and 6 June. Though he lost his baggage train, two guns, and 2,042 men, Ney managed to escape to the southwest over the Pasłęka (Passarge) River with the bulk of his soldiers.

Within two days, Napoleon had ordered his 190,000-man army to close in on the 100,000 Russians and 15,000 Prussians. Aware of their approach, Bennigsen ordered his troops to fall back on Lidzbark Warmiński in the Prussian Partition of Poland (Heilsberg in German). The Russian army took up strong defensive positions around the town, which stood on the Łyna (Alle) River. The French army, under Marshal Murat, attacked on 10 June. Then Napoleon Bonaparte and Jean Lannes' corps approached, and Napoleon took joint command. The Polish 5th Mounted Rifles Regiment under Colonel Kazimierz Turno also took part in the battle on the side of Napoleon. Bennigsen repelled several attacks, resulting in huge French casualties, but had to withdraw towards Friedland the following day. Four days later, the decisive Battle of Friedland occurred, ending the War of the Fourth Coalition with the passing of the Treaty of Tilsit.

== Influences on the battle ==
=== Geography ===
The Battle of Heilsberg was fought on the Alle river, known today as the Lyna. The Teutonic Castle being the focal point of the battle was held by Russian control.

=== Terrain ===
Aside from geographical advantages, the Russians had also spent three to four months compiling tactics on how to defend against a French invasion, regardless of where they would attack the castlegrounds. Defensively, the castle was supported by its bridges and walls, both of which were built along the perimeter of the castle. The land surrounding the Teutonic Castle acted as an obstacle for the French army due to the increase of elevation from the base of the river to the castles foundation. The Prussian 21st Fusiliers, commanded by Ludwig August von Stutterheim, was garrisoned there.

=== Climate ===
Although the terrain was punishment enough for the French, weather also took a toll on their abilities and health. During the day, on top of the weight being carried in regards to supplies and armory, temperatures reached dangerously hot and humid levels. The dampness and bitter cold of the night also played a significant role by providing little opportunity for rest.

== Battle ==
=== Tactics ===
Benningsen had been fooled into retreat by false reports of the French numbers. The Russians, having moved back to Heilsberg, had some protection from substantial fieldworks. To storm the fortifications, Napoleon had to choose between an immediate advance or a flanking movement, threatening the Russian supply base of Königsberg (now Kaliningrad). He chose the latter, and the French thus positioned themselves to cut off any opportunity for the Russians to obtain reinforcements.

=== Fighting ===
The French cavalry under Joachim Murat was selected to lead the frontal attack, but Napoleon did not arrive on the field in person until Murat had already led a disastrous charge. Marshals Mortier and Davout advanced on the Königsberg side.

At first, Murat attacked Borozdin and forced him to retreat. Bennigsen, having sent 7 battalions of infantry, 1 regiment of cavalry and 2 guns to support Borozdin, ordered Bagration to cross to the left bank of the Alle River, join Borozdin's detachment and hold off the French until most of the army had been moved from the right bank to the left. Prince Bagration took up his position on the left bank, with his right flank on the Langwiese and his left on the Alle. In the afternoon, Soult's infantry came and immediately attacked; Murat's cavalry moved to the detour between Langwiese and Lawden. At this time, however, Major General Kozhin's mounted detachment (1,000 men), which formed the left-hand column of Lieutenant General Uvarov's troops (3 jaeger regiments and 25 squadrons), moved by Bennigsen in support of Bagration, came to his aid; it temporarily held back the onslaught of French cavalry, and the Guard Battery, located on the right bank of the Alle opposite the mouth of the Spuibach, stopped Soult's infantry; Bagration's vanguard was able to withdraw to the main position, where it became a reserve; Kozhin's detachment, having joined with Uvarov's right column, which had failed at Lawden in the battle with Legrand's division, withdrew to the right flank.

At 6 pm Napoleon arrived on the battlefield with part of Lannes' corps and the Fusilier guardsmen. Soult and Lannes, leading separate cavalry units, and Ney, with the infantry, moved forwards on both sides of the River Łyna. Divisional general Legrand was ordered to attack the central redoubt; the French managed to break into the redoubt. Lieutenant General Gorchakov, commanding the special corps of Bennigsen's army, attacked the French and seized the redoubt back. One of the regiments of Divisional general Saint-Hilaire, moved by him to help Legrand, was also repulsed. Failure in the centre forced Napoleon to shift his main attention to the enemy's right flank; but even here, despite the arrival of the rest of Lannes' corps, the attacks were unsuccessful. Tightly pressed by the Russian cavalry, the French army withdrew behind Spuibach stream, holding back only the grove of Lawden. Smaller French units proved ineffective, especially when Prussian reinforcements arrived, sent by Anton Wilhelm von L'Estocq at Bennigsen's request. Strong artillery cannonade from both sides continued until darkness fell, when Lannes with Verdier's division made a new attempt to capture the central redoubt, but was forced to retreat, which cost the French 3,000 casualties. Bonaparte initially did not intend for the battle to end this way.

On 11 June, however, the substantial casualties on both sides and the success of the Russian defence gave Bennigsen and Napoleon little choice but to call an undocumented truce to end hostilities. On the night of that same day, Davout's corps arrived at the battlefield, but Napoleon abandoned the idea of renewing the attack the following day, wanting to first assemble all his troops. Meanwhile, Bennigsen, expecting a renewed attack on the 11th, had reinforced his battle lines, but seeing the enemy's inaction and fearing being cut off from L'Estocq corps in the event of another battle at Heilsberg, on the evening of 11 June, he moved Count Kamensky's detachment to join the latter, and on the night of 12 June, he himself moved his army to the right bank of the Alle and headed for Bartenstein.

On the Russian side, Bennigsen was suffering from a sudden fever and had difficulty remaining in command. Andrey I. Gorchakov, on Grand Duke Constantine's orders, due to the illness of commander-in-chief Bennigsen, took over general command for the rest of the day in the final hours of the battle, bringing it to a tactical draw.

The French had lost an estimated 12,000 men, while the Russians lost about 8,000 soldiers. The truce was focused primarily on the recovery of wounded soldiers. The battle ended with medics and soldiers from both sides helping the wounded and retrieving the dead. When Napoleon entered the deserted Russian positions the following day, he found that all except the wounded had been evacuated overnight.

== Outcome and post-war analysis ==
This battle is recognized as having been strategically inconclusive due to neither side having gained any significant ground, it is most notably discussed as a battle that yielded little change in the balance of strength between the Russians and the French. By most accounts, this was a successful Russo-Prussian rearguard action. Napoleon never realized he faced the entire army at Heilsberg. Murat and Soult attacked prematurely and at the strongest point in the Russo-Prussian line. The Russians had built extensive fortifications on the right bank of the Alle river, but only a few minor redoubts on the left bank, yet the French advanced over the river to give battle, squandering their advantages and incurring casualties The Battle of Heilsberg was fought four days before the decisive Battle of Friedland.

=== French Army losses ===
On both sides, disputes over the killed and wounded remain. The French claimed 1,398 killed, 10,059 wounded, 864 captured. Three units lost their eagles, and Digby Smith places the losses higher than Clodfelter, at 1,398 killed, 10,059 wounded and 864 captured. Nicolas Jean-de-Dieu Soult's IV corps sustained the majority of losses: 8,286, and General François Xavier Roussel, Chief of Staff of the Imperial Guard, was killed. Three generals were wounded, and Jean Lannes' corps lost 2,284 killed and wounded.

=== Russo-Prussian losses ===
Disputed figures as well, Clodfelter estimates 6,000 killed and wounded. In addition, generals Koschin, Warneck, and Pahlen were killed; Dmitry Dokhturov, Werdrevski, Fock, Zakhar Dmitrievich Olsufiev, Duka, Laptiev, Passeck and Duke Charles of Mecklenburg were wounded. The Russian commander, Bennigsen was sick all day, but remained on his horse despite falling off unconscious several times. Digby Smith says that the Russian–Prussian force lost 2–3,000 dead, and about 5–6,000 wounded, and they lost two guns.

Notable officers of the French Army present were:

- Commander-in-Chief: Napoléon Bonaparte (Marshall Joachim Murat led the French troops at the start of the battle);
  - Marshal Louis-Alexandre Berthier, prince de Neuchâtel;
  - Marshal Nicolas Jean-de-Dieu Soult;
  - Marshal Jean Lannes;
    - Major General Nicolas Charles Oudinot;
    - Major General Jean-Antoine Verdier;
      - Colonel François-Joseph d'Offenstein (made Brigadier General further to this battle).

Notable officers of the Russian Army present were:

- Commander-in-Chief: Leonty Leontyevich Bennigsen, at the end of the battle he was sick, but remained in the battlefield — he was replaced by Lieutenant General Andrey Gorchakov;
  - Lieutenant General Matvei Platov;
  - Lieutenant General Prince Gorchakov;
  - Lieutenant General Dmitry Dokhturov (wounded);
  - Lieutenant General Prince Bagration;
    - Major General Fabian Steinheil.

| Preceded by Battle of Guttstadt-Deppen | Napoleonic Wars; Battle of Heilsberg | Succeeded by Battle of Friedland |
