= Battle of Shevardino =

1812 battle during the French invasion of Russia

- Part of the French invasion of Russia
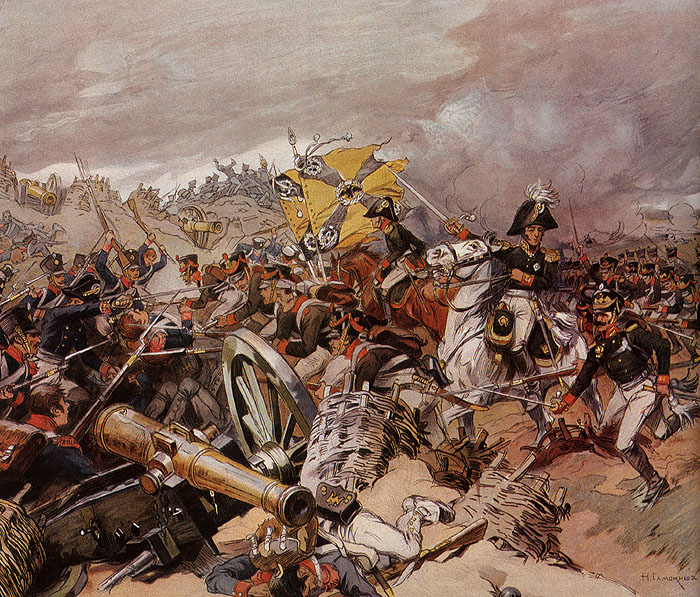
- The Attack of the Shevardino Redoubt by Nikolay Samokish, 1910
Date	5 September [O.S. 24 August] 1812
Location	near Borodino, Russia 55°30′25″N 35°47′48″E
Result	French victory

Belligerents
France; Italy; Naples; Duchy of Warsaw	Russia

Commanders and leaders
(First French Empire) Napoleon; (First French Empire) Louis-Nicolas Davout; (Kingdom of Italy (Napoleonic)) E. de Beauharnais; (Kingdom of Naples) Joachim Murat; (Duchy of Warsaw) Józef Poniatowski	(Russian Empire) Pyotr Bagration; (Russian Empire) Andrei Gorchakov

Strength
36,000	20,000

Casualties and losses
4,000 § Casualties	6,000; 3 cannon § Casualties

French invasion of Russia
Current battle
Prussian corps
Napoleon
Austrian corps

The Battle of Shevardino took place on 5 September [O.S. 24 August] 1812 between French and Russian troops, with a victory of the French army.

== Prelude ==
The initial Russian position, which stretched south of the new Smolensk Highway (Napoleon's expected route of advance), was anchored on its left by a pentagonal earthwork redoubt erected on a mound near the village of Shevardino. Kutuzov stated that the fortification was manned simply to delay the advance of the French forces.

== Battle ==
The Shevardino redoubt was defended by Prince Gorchakov's troops, part of Pyotr Bagration's Second Western Army. The conflict began on September 5 when Marshal Joachim Murat's French forces met Konovnitsyn's Russians in a massive cavalry clash, the Russians eventually retreating to the Kolorzkoi Cloister when their flank was threatened. Fighting resumed the next day but Konovnitsyn again retreated when Viceroy Eugène de Beauharnais' Fourth Corps arrived, threatening his flank. The Russians withdrew to the Shevardino Redoubt, where a pitched battle ensued. Murat led Nansouty's First Cavalry Corps and Montbrun's Second Cavalry Corps, supported by Compans's Division of Louis Nicolas Davout's First Infantry Corps against the redoubt. Simultaneously, Prince Józef Poniatowski's Polish infantry attacked the position from the south. The French captured it. The small redoubt was destroyed and covered by the dead and dying of both sides.

=== Casualties ===
The French won the combat at a cost of 4,000 French and 6,000 Russian casualties, and 3 Russian cannons were captured. The estimates of 2,000 French casualties refer only to the fighting at the redoubt itself, and do not include Konovnitsyn's actions. Losses of 7,000 were suffered by the Russians in all actions, including the previous 2 days.

== Aftermath ==
The unexpected French advance from the west and the fall of the Shevardino redoubt threw the Russian formation into disarray. Since the left flank of their defensive position had collapsed, Russian forces withdrew to the east, constructing a makeshift position centered around the village of Utitsa. The left flank of the Russian position was thus ripe for a flanking attack. The Battle of Borodino would begin two days later.

== See also ==
- List of battles of the French invasion of Russia
