= Andrei Ivanovich Gorchakov =

Russian commander (1779–1855)

Prince Andrei Ivanovich Gorchakov
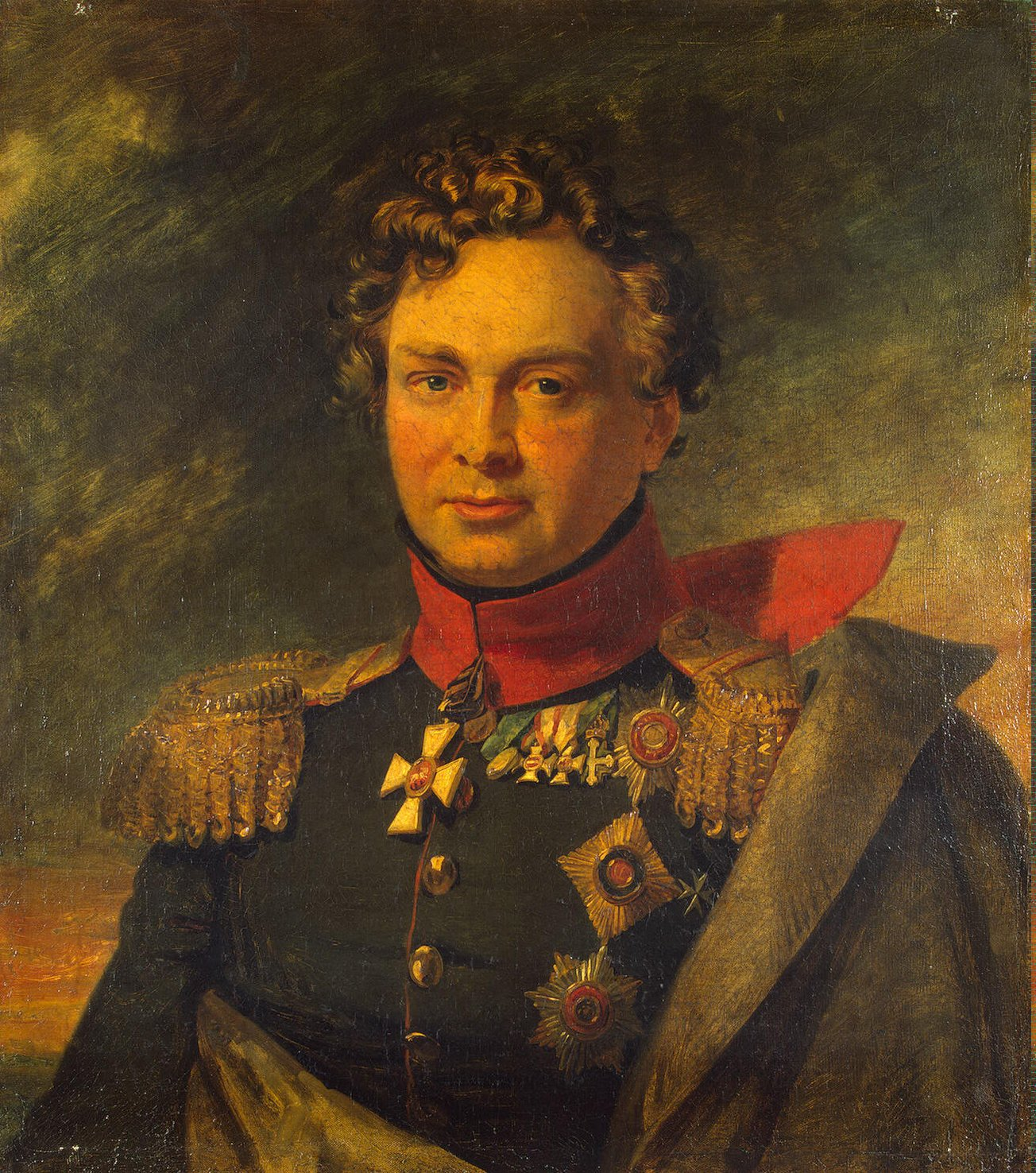
- Portrait by G. Dawe
- Born: 1779; Moscow
- Died: 1855 (aged 75–76); Moscow
- Other name: Andrey
- Relatives: Alexander Vasilyevich Suvorov (uncle)
- Military career
- Allegiance: Russian Empire
- Branch: Infantry
- Service years: 1786–1820
- Rank: General of the Infantry
- Commands: 1st Infantry Corps
- Conflicts: See list: War of the Second Coalition; Battle of Cassano; Battle of Trebbia; Battle of Novi; War of the Fourth Coalition; Battle of Heilsberg; Battle of Friedland; French invasion of Russia; Battle of Smolensk; Battle of Shevardino; Battle of Borodino (WIA); War of the Sixth Coalition; Battle of Bautzen; Battle of Dresden; Battle of Leipzig; Battle of Brienne; Battle of Bar-sur-Aube; Battle of Laubressel; Battle of Paris

Member of the State Council
- In office 1816–1817
- Monarch: Alexander

Prince Andrei Ivanovich Gorchakov (Russian: Андре́й Ива́нович Горчако́в; 1779 – 1855) led a Russian infantry corps in the German Campaign of 1813 and the French Campaign of 1814 during the Napoleonic Wars. He participated in the 1799 Italian and Swiss expedition on the staff of his uncle Alexander Suvorov and was at Cassano, the Trebbia and Novi. At Heilsberg he replaced Bennigsen as commander-in-chief, at Friedland he was at the head of the army's right wing (1807). In 1812 he fought at Smolensk and Borodino. At Bautzen in May 1813 he led the second line of the Right Wing. He commanded the 1st Infantry Corps, at Dresden and Leipzig in 1813 and at Bar-sur-Aube, Laubressel and Paris in 1814. Andrei Gorchakov ultimately achieved the rank of general of the infantry. He was a State Council member in 1816–17.

The son of the writer Mikhail Zagoskin, who saw Gorchakov in 1851, wrote about him:

The old man was tall, thin, stooped and white as a harrier. Out of old habit, he did not wear a moustache, which gave his clean-shaven, wrinkled face a resemblance to the face of some respectable old woman. The prince could have been an interesting storyteller about the past times he had lived, but, unfortunately, he rarely indulged in conversation, sat still, looked gloomily and came for dinners, probably with the aim of having a tasty and satisfying meal.

== Honours ==
- • Order of St. George 3rd class (for Borodino)
- • Order of St. George 2nd class (for Paris)
