= Army of Bohemia =

Field army during the Napoleonic Wars

The Army of Bohemia was a coalition field army during the War of the Sixth Coalition in 1813–1814. It was under the command of the Austrian field marshal Karl Philipp zu Schwarzenberg. In addition to commanding the field army, Schwarzenberg was also the supreme allied commander and the commander of the Austrian army in Bohemia.

The Army of Bohemia was formed by placing the Austrian, Russian and Prussian corps in Bohemia under a single command. The Russian and Prussian corps were commanded by Michael Andreas Barclay de Tolly, who was subordinate to Schwarzenberg. Schwarzenberg's command was designated the Army of Bohemia on 1 May 1813. His chief of staff was Joseph Radetzky and all three coalition sovereigns—Emperor Francis I of Austria, Tsar Alexander I of Russia and King Frederick William III of Prussia—stayed at his headquarters. Including reserves and guards, the Army of Bohemia contained 127,435 Austrians, 78,200 Russians and 44,907 Prussians. This included well over half of Austria's front-line troops.

The Army of Bohemia crossed the frontier into Saxony on 22 August. It was defeated and suffered 38,000 casualties and the loss of 40 guns in the Battle of Dresden (26–27 August). Pursued back into Bohemia, it fought a successful defence in the Battle of Kulm on 29–30 August 1813. With the Army of Silesia, it was victorious in the Battle of Leipzig (16–19 October), after which it pushed across Germany and invaded France. Schwarzenberg placed a portion of the Army of Bohemia under the command of Gebhard Leberecht von Blücher of the Army of Silesia for the Battle of La Rothière on 1 February 1814. Afterwards, the armies separated again, although both advanced on Paris. The Army of Bohemia captured Bar-sur-Aube (27 February) and was victorious in the Battle of Arcis-sur-Aube (20–21 March). It entered Paris on 31 March, effectively bringing the war to an end.

== Bibliography ==
- Epstein, Robert M. (2012). "Aspects of Military and Operational Effectiveness of the Armies of France, Austria, Russia and Prussia in 1813". In Frederick C. Schneid (ed.). The Projection and Limitations of Imperial Powers, 1618–1850. Brill. pp. 122–148.
- Leggiere, Michael V. (2021). "Prometheus Chained, 1813–1815". In Michael V. Leggiere (ed.). Napoleon and the Operational Art of War: Essays in Honor of Donald D. Horward (Rev. ed.). Brill. pp. 423–492.
