= Antoine Maurin =

French Army officer (1771–1830)

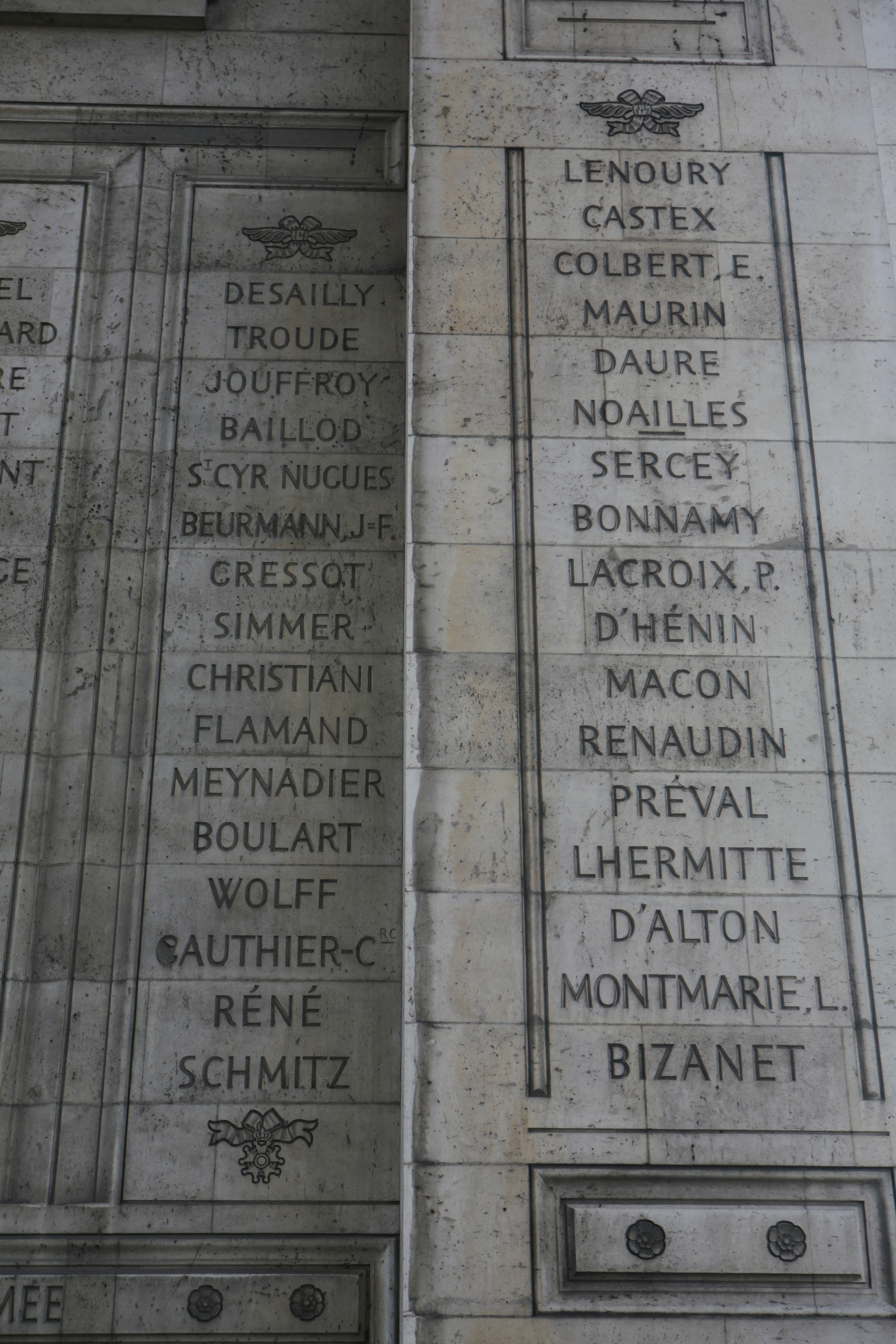
- Maurin is the fourth name on Column 40
- Born: 19 December 1771; Montpellier, France
- Died: 4 October 1830 (aged 58)
- Military career
- Allegiance: French First Republic; First French Empire; Kingdom of France
- Branch: French Revolutionary Army; French Imperial Army; French Royal Army
- Service years: 1792–1823
- Rank: Divisional general
- Conflicts: French Revolutionary Wars; Battle of Biberach; Battle of Valvasone; Napoleonic Wars; Battle of Caldiero; Battle of Guttstadt-Deppen; Battle of Friedland; Invasion of Portugal; Battle of Dresden; Battle of Leipzig; Battle of Laubressel; Battle of Ligny
- Awards: Legion of Honor
- Other work: Baron of the Empire, 1808

Divisional-General Antoine Maurin (French pronunciation: [ɑ̃twan moʁɛ̃]; 19 December 1771 – 4 October 1830) was a French Army officer who commanded a cavalry division in 1814 and in 1815 led his troops against the Prussians at the Battle of Ligny, where he was wounded. His army service began in 1792 during the French Revolution when he enlisted in a cavalry regiment as a trooper. He spent his entire military career as a cavalryman. During the French Revolutionary Wars he advanced through the ranks and became commander of a light cavalry regiment in 1802.

While only a colonel, he commanded a brigade at Caldiero in October 1805. He fought in the Friedland campaign in 1807 and attained the rank of general officer that year. As a cavalry brigadier, he participated in the 1807 Invasion of Portugal but was captured in 1808 and held until 1812. He led a brigade in 1813 and a division in 1814 during the War of the Sixth Coalition. After fighting for Napoleon during the Hundred Days, he retired in 1823. His surname is one of the names inscribed under the Arc de Triomphe, on Column 40.

== Early career ==
Maurin was born in Montpellier, France on 19 December 1771. He joined the 20th Chasseurs à Cheval Regiment as a trooper in 1792. He served in a number of actions during the War of the First Coalition rising to the rank of officer. He was wounded in the shoulder by a saber cut at the Battle of Biberach in 1796. He fought at the Battle of Valvasone in 1797 and received a battlefield promotion to captain from Napoleon Bonaparte. That year he was an aide-de-camp to Jean-Baptiste Bernadotte, then a division commander. Believing he was about to be replaced, Bernadotte wrote a letter to Bonaparte asking that he find employment for his aides Maurin and Eugène-Casimir Villatte.

On 24 April 1802 Maurin was named to lead the 24th Chasseur à Cheval Regiment as Chef de Brigade (colonel). While still a colonel, he led a brigade consisting of the 15th and 24th Chasseurs à Cheval at the Battle of Caldiero on 29–31 October 1805. Transferred to Poland, he fought at the Battle of Guttstadt-Deppen and the Battle of Friedland in 1807. He was promoted to general of brigade on 25 June 1807.

== General officer ==
Maurin led a cavalry brigade in Andoche Junot's army during the 1807 Invasion of Portugal. He was named Baron of the Empire on 17 March 1808. He reported to François Étienne de Kellermann who commanded a cavalry division that included one squadron each of the 26th Chasseurs à Cheval, 1st, 3rd, 4th, 5th, 9th, and 15th Dragoons. Maurin was appointed governor of Algarve province in the south of Portugal. When the revolt against the French occupation broke out, he was in his sickbed in Faro. He and 70 other French soldiers were captured by Portuguese partisans on 16 June 1808 and handed over to the captain of a British naval vessel as prisoners.

Maurin remained a prisoner until September 1812. After his return he fought at the Battle of Dresden on 26–27 August 1813. He received the Commander's Cross of the Légion d'Honneur on 28 September 1813. Maurin commanded the 9th Light Cavalry Brigade in Rémi Joseph Isidore Exelmans' division of the II Cavalry Corps at the Battle of Leipzig on 16–19 October. The brigade included the 4th, 7th, and 20th Chasseurs à Cheval, and 6th Lancer Regiments.

On 20 February 1814, Maurin's 2nd Light Cavalry Division was part of the II Cavalry Corps and was made up of the 1st Brigade under Jean-Baptiste Dommanget and the 2nd Brigade under an officer named Jamin. The 838-strong 1st Brigade included the 5th and 9th Hussar, 11th and 12th Chasseurs à Cheval, and 2nd and 4th Lancer Regiments. The 962-man 2nd Brigade consisted of the 7th, 20th, 23rd, and 24th Chasseurs à Cheval, and 6th Lancer Regiments. Maurin led this unit at the Battle of Laubressel on 3–4 March 1814. An order of battle for 10 March notes that the division included a detachment from the 5th Horse Artillery armed with three 6-pounder guns and one howitzer, numbering 53 gunners and 53 teamsters. By this date, hard campaigning had shrunk the 1st Brigade to 606 troopers and the 2nd Brigade to 476 troopers. By 1 May 1814, Maurin's 2nd Light Cavalry Division was in the I Cavalry Corps and included the same regiments as in February.

After Napoleon's abdication Maurin submitted to King Louis XVIII. He later rejoined the emperor during the Hundred Days and was appointed to command the 7th Cavalry Division in the 1815 campaign. The division's 1st Brigade was led by Louis Vallin and consisted of the 6th Hussars and 8th Chasseurs à Cheval Regiments. The 2nd Brigade was under Pierre Marie Auguste Berruyer and comprised the 6th, 11th, and 18th Dragoon Regiments. At the Battle of Ligny on 16 June 1815, Maurin was wounded in the chest by a bullet. He retired in 1823. After the July Revolution of 1830 he returned to active service but died on 4 October 1830. His surname is one of the names inscribed under the Arc de Triomphe, on the west pillar.
