= Laubressel =

Commune in Grand Est, France

- Commune
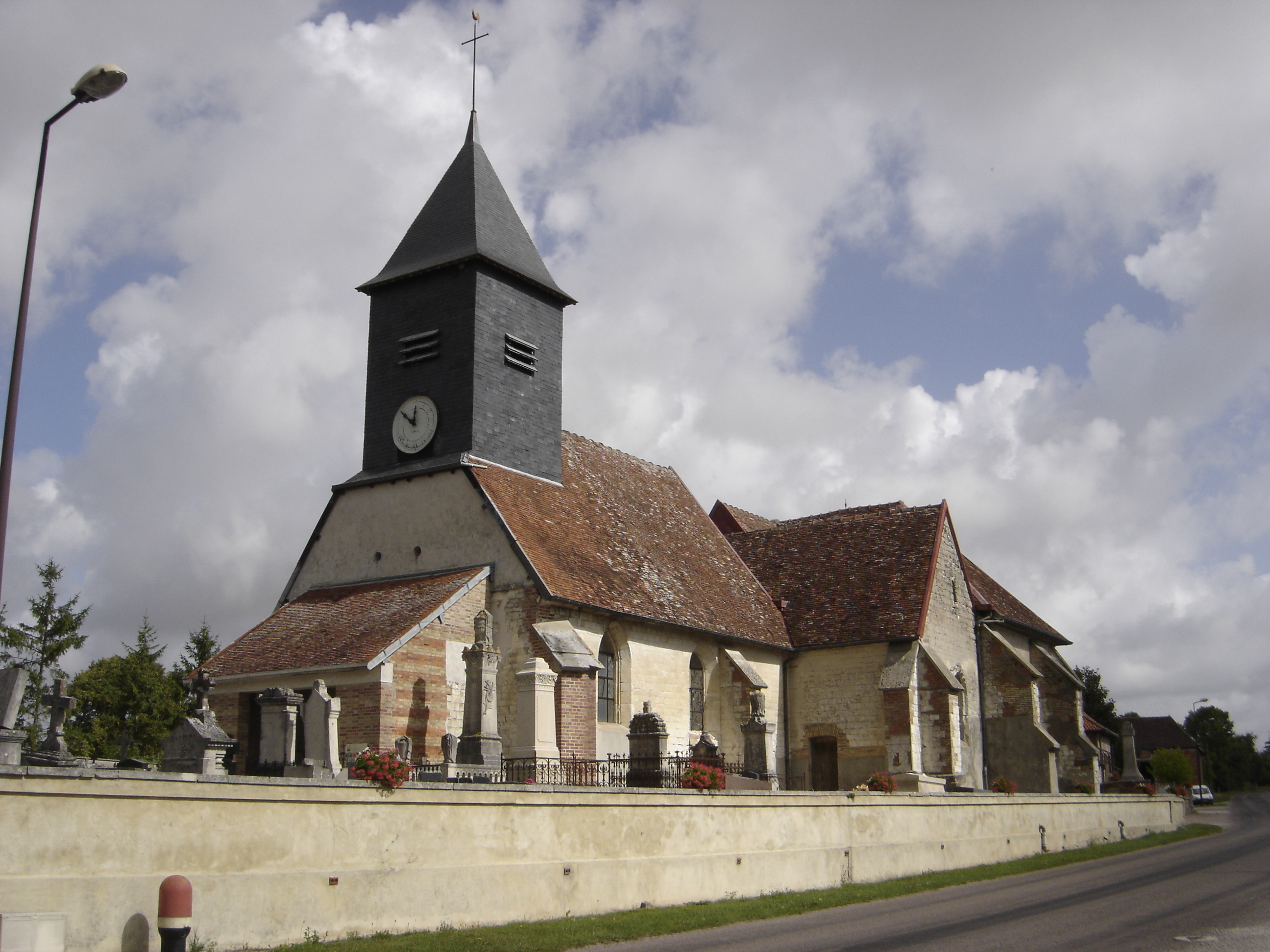
- The church in Laubressel
- Location of Laubressel
- Location within France Location within Grand Est
- Coordinates: 48°17′59″N 4°12′46″E
- Country: France
- Region: Grand Est
- Department: Aube
- Arrondissement: Troyes
- Canton: Vendeuvre-sur-Barse
- Intercommunality: CA Troyes Champagne Métropole

Government
  - Mayor (2020–2026): Régis Thiénot
- Area^{1}: 16.24 km^{2} (6.27 sq mi)
- Elevation: 163 m (535 ft)
- Population (2023): 551
  - Density: 33.9/km^{2} (87.9/sq mi)
- Time zone: UTC+01:00 (CET)
  - Summer (DST): UTC+02:00 (CEST)
- INSEE/Postal code: 10190 /10270
- ^{1} French Land Register data, which excludes lakes, ponds, glaciers > 1 km^{2} (0.386 sq mi or 247 acres) and river estuaries.

Laubressel (French pronunciation: [lobʁɛsɛl]) is a commune in the Aube department in north-central France.

== Population ==
Historical population
Year	Pop.	±% p.a.
1968	267	—
1975	239	−1.57%
1982	258	+1.10%
1990	279	+0.98%
1999	329	+1.85%
2007	406	+2.66%
2012	498	+4.17%
2017	539	+1.59%
2023	551	+0.37%
Source: INSEE

== See also ==
- Communes of the Aube department
- Parc naturel régional de la Forêt d'Orient
