= Battle of Bar-sur-Aube =

1814 battle during the War of the Sixth Coalition

- Part of the War of the Sixth Coalition
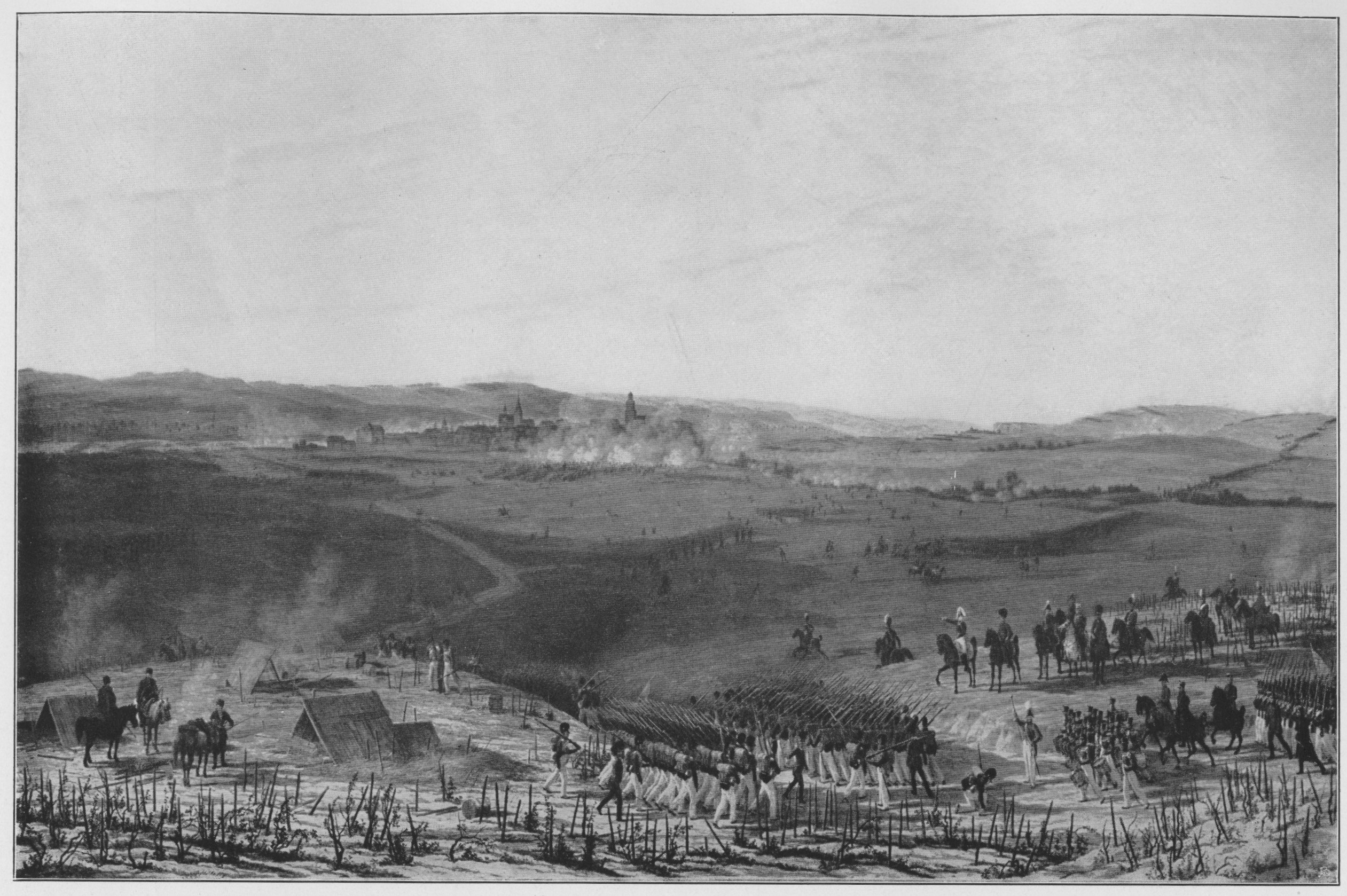
- The painting shows the movement of the Bavarian foot soldiers in the meeting of Bar-sur-Aube.
Date	27 February 1814
Location	Bar-sur-Aube, French Empire 48°16′N 04°43′E
Result	Coalition victory

Belligerents
(First French Empire) France	(Austrian Empire) Austria (Kingdom of Bavaria) Bavaria (Russian Empire) Russia

Commanders and leaders
(First French Empire) Jacques MacDonald (First French Empire) Nicolas Oudinot (First French Empire) Étienne Maurice Gérard	(Austrian Empire) Karl von Schwarzenberg (Kingdom of Bavaria) Karl Philipp von Wrede (Russian Empire) Peter Wittgenstein

Strength
18,000–22,000; 60 guns	27,000–30,000; 70 guns

Casualties and losses
3,100 killed, wounded, or captured 2 guns lost	1,900 killed, wounded, or captured
- Location within France

War of the Sixth Coalition:
Campaign in north-east France
current battle
Napoleon in command
Napoleon not in command

The Battle of Bar-sur-Aube was fought on 27 February 1814, between the First French Empire and the Austrian Empire. French forces were led by Jacques MacDonald, while the Austrians and their Bavarian-Russian allies, forming the Army of Bohemia, were led by Karl Philipp Fürst zu Schwarzenberg. The coalition was victorious.

== Background ==
Napoleon I himself, having defeated the Allies at Montereau on 17 February, forcing them to retreat toward Troyes beyond the river Aube, had turned north to the valley of the Marne to try to impede the renewed drive toward Paris by the Army of Silesia (mostly Prussians) under Field Marshal Gebhard von Blücher; the marshals he left behind were ordered to make it appear as though he was still with them. Schwarzenberg tested that assumption by advancing upon Bar-sur-Aube (in part because Alexander I of Russia and Frederick William III of Prussia wanted him to do so), and on the twenty-sixth Napoleon ordered Oudinot to follow Schwarzenberg to the town, near Troyes.

== Battle ==
When it was learned that Napoleon was preparing to attack the Army of Silesia, Schwarzenberg took the opportunity to strike first at Oudinot with a Russian corps under General Peter Wittgenstein and a Bavarian corps under General Karl von Wrede. Although MacDonald enjoyed a measure of numerical superiority at the outset, many of his troops were cut off from the main theater of the battle by their deployment astride the Aube and were therefore unable to participate, much of the French artillery being stuck on the wrong side of the river.

== Aftermath ==
MacDonald was forced to retreat over the Aube, but he continued retreating for the next few days, pursued by the Allies and leaving Schwarzenberg in an advantageous position, able to concentrate his forces at Troyes as well as to take possession of the river crossings of the Seine.

A Russian cavalry officer, Eduardo von Lowenstern, witnessed the revenge the Bavarians took on the town for the loss of a battalion: “The houses were being stormed. Women and old people murdered, children thrown from the second floor onto the paving and smashed.”

In the north-east of Paris a Prussian army went into the Battle of Gué-à-Tresmes.

== Notes ==
Preceded by Battle of Orthez	Napoleonic Wars; Battle of Bar-sur-Aube	Succeeded by Battle of Laon
