= War of the Sixth Coalition =

1813–1814 conflict during the Napoleonic Wars

- Part of the Napoleonic Wars and the Coalition Wars
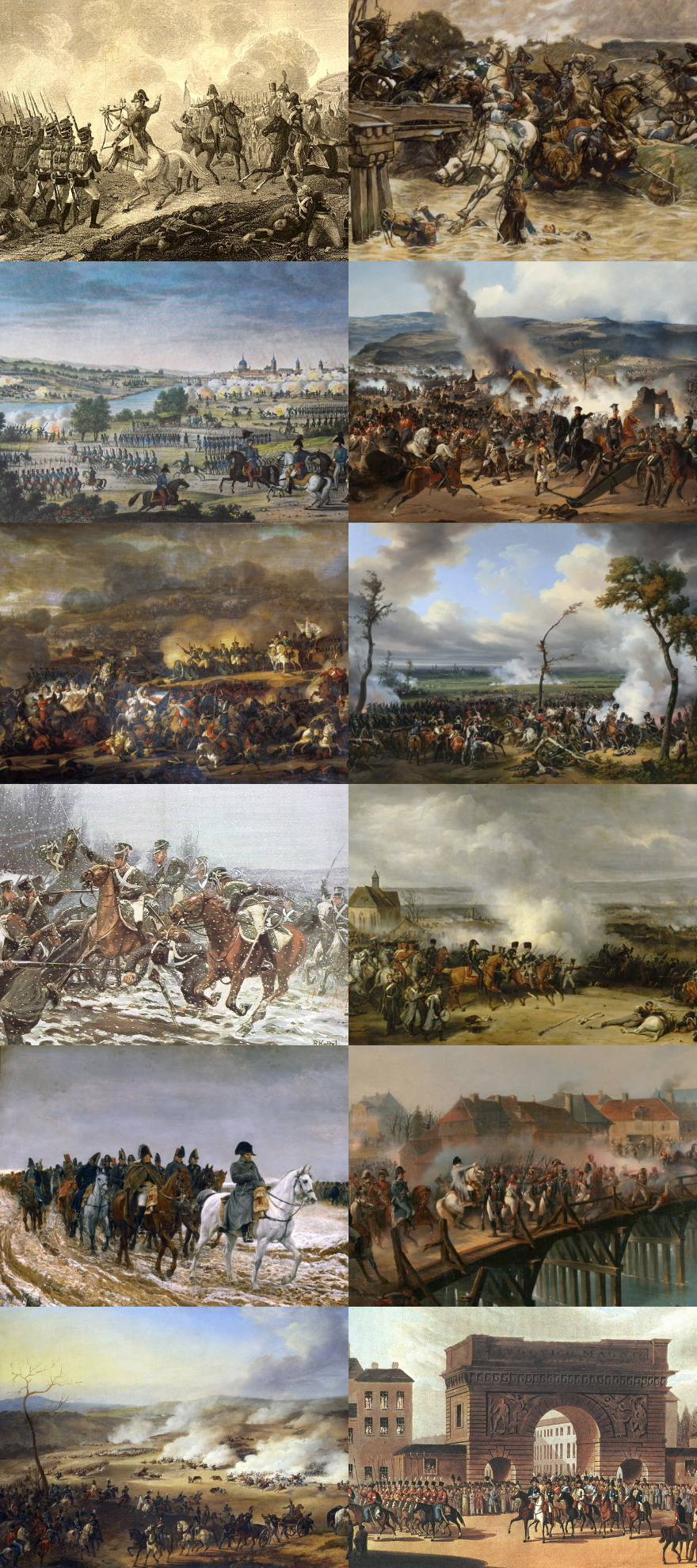
- War of the Sixth Coalition Each image links to a battle. Left to right, top to bottom: Battles of Lutzen, Katzbach, Dresden, Kulm, Leipzig, Hanau, Rothière, Laubressel, Laon, Arcis, Champenoise, Paris
Date	24 December 1812 – 30 May 1814 (1 year, 5 months and 6 days)
Location	Central and Eastern Europe, the Low Countries, France
Result	Coalition victory

Belligerents
Original coalition: Russia; Prussia; Spain; United Kingdom; Hanover; (Grand Duchy of Mecklenburg-Schwerin) Mecklenburg-Schwerin; Portugal; Sardinia; Sicily; Sweden; After the Armistice of Pläswitz: Austria; Bavaria; After the Battle of Leipzig: (Grand Duchy of Baden) Baden; Saxony; After 20 November 1813: (Sovereign Principality of the United Netherlands) Netherlands; After January 1814: Denmark; Naples	France: Duchy of Warsaw (Note: The Duchy of Warsaw as a state was in effect fully occupied by Russian and Prussian forces by May 1813, although most Poles remained loyal to Napoleon.); Italy; Naples (until January, 1814); Napoleonic Spain (Note: Dissolved after the Battle of Vitoria in June 1813); Confederation of the Rhine (Note: Many member states defected after the Battle of Leipzig); Denmark–Norway (1813–1814)

Commanders and leaders
(Russian Empire) Alexander I; (Russian Empire) Mikhail Kutuzov #; (Russian Empire) Levin von Bennigsen; (Russian Empire) Peter Wittgenstein; (Russian Empire) Barclay de Tolly; (Russian Empire) Mikhail Miloradovich; (Austrian Empire) Francis I; (Austrian Empire) Karl von Schwarzenberg; (Kingdom of Prussia) Frederick William III; (Kingdom of Prussia) Gebhard von Blücher; (Kingdom of Prussia) Ludwig Yorck; (Kingdom of Prussia) Friedrich von Bülow; (United Kingdom of Great Britain and Ireland) (Electorate of Brunswick-Lüneburg) George, Prince Regent; (United Kingdom of Great Britain and Ireland) Earl of Liverpool; (United Kingdom of Great Britain and Ireland) Duke of Wellington; (Sweden) Charles XIII; (Sweden) Charles John; (Spain) Ferdinand VII; (Kingdom of Portugal) Prince Regent John; (Kingdom of Bavaria) Maximilian I Joseph (from 1813); (Kingdom of Bavaria) Karl Philipp von Wrede; (Kingdom of Saxony) Frederick Augustus I (from 1813); (Sovereign Principality of the United Netherlands) William I	(First French Empire) Napoleon I (surrendered); (First French Empire) Louis-Alexandre Berthier; (First French Empire) Jean-Baptiste Bessières †; (First French Empire) Louis-Nicolas Davout; (First French Empire) Jean-Baptiste Jourdan; (First French Empire) Jacques MacDonald; (First French Empire) Auguste de Marmont; (First French Empire) Michel Ney; (First French Empire) Nicolas Oudinot; (First French Empire) Jean-de-Dieu Soult; (First French Empire) Louis-Gabriel Suchet; (First French Empire) Dominique Vandamme; (Kingdom of Italy (Napoleonic)) Eugène de Beauharnais; Joachim Murat (until January, 1814); (Spain under Joseph Bonaparte) Joseph I; (Kingdom of Bavaria) Maximilian I Joseph (until 1813); (Kingdom of Saxony) (Duchy of Warsaw) Frederick Augustus I (until 1813); (Duchy of Warsaw) Józef Poniatowski †; (Kingdom of Westphalia) Jérôme I; (Denmark–Norway) Frederick VI; (until January, 1814)

Strength
1813: (Austrian Empire) 568,000 (Kingdom of Prussia) 281,000 (Spain) 160,000 (United Kingdom of Great Britain and Ireland) 87,000 (Kingdom of Portugal) 28,000 (Kingdom of Bavaria) 24,500	1813: 850,000

Casualties and losses
Combat casualties: 526,000 (total including disease is much higher): (Russian Empire) 145,000 killed or wounded, 40,000 captured/missing; (Austrian Empire) 70,000 killed or wounded, 40,000 captured/missing; (Kingdom of Prussia) 95,000 killed or wounded, 30,000 captured/missing; (United Kingdom of Great Britain and Ireland) 40,000 killed or wounded, 7,000 captured/missing; (Spain) 20,000 killed or wounded, 5,000 captured/missing; (Kingdom of Portugal) 7,000 killed wounded, 1,000 captured/missing; (Kingdom of Bavaria) 10,000 killed or wounded, 10,000 captured/missing; (Sweden) 3,000 killed or wounded, 1,000 captured/missing; (Kingdom of Saxony) 1,000 killed or wounded, 1,000 captured/missing	Combat casualties: 610,000 (total including disease is much higher): (First French Empire) 310,000 killed or wounded, 180,000 captured/missing; (Kingdom of Italy (Napoleonic)) 20,000 killed or wounded, 12,000 captured/missing; (Duchy of Warsaw) 13,000 killed or wounded, 22,000 captured/missing; (Denmark–Norway) 1,000 killed or wounded; Rhine Confederation: 18,000 killed or wounded, 30,000 captured/missing; Other: 3,000 killed or wounded, 2,000 captured

Napoleonic Wars
List of numbered map items:
1 Third Coalition: Germany 1803:...Austerlitz...
2 Fourth Coalition: Prussia 1806:...Jena...
3 Peninsular War: Portugal 1807...Torres Vedras...
4 Peninsular War: Spain 1808...Vitoria...
5 Fifth Coalition: Austria 1809:...Wagram...
6 French invasion of Russia 1812:...Moscow...
7 Sixth Coalition: Germany 1813:...Leipzig...
8 Sixth Coalition: France 1814:...Paris...
9 Hundred Days 1815:...Waterloo...

The War of the Sixth Coalition (French: Guerre de la Sixième Coalition; December 1812 – May 1814), sometimes known in Germany as the Wars of Liberation (German: Befreiungskriege), saw a coalition of Austria, Prussia, Russia, Spain, the United Kingdom, Portugal, Sweden, Sardinia, and a number of German states defeat the First French Empire and force Napoleon into exile on Elba. Following the disastrous French invasion of Russia in 1812 in which they had been forced to support France, Prussia and Austria joined Russia, Britain, Sweden, Portugal and Spain against France.

The invasion of Russia cost the French many seasoned soldiers, so Napoleon took action to engage "Marie-Louises", young conscripts who were barely familiar with military affairs; they were called up from October 1813 to 1815. However, the constant warfare weakened the Coalition nations as well. The Russian military was particularly depleted after 1812, and Prussia also suffered a significant downgrade as a result of its losses in 1806–1807; nevertheless, it carried out large-scale reforms to improve the situation in the Prussian Army. Later, having encountered the Prussians in the Battle of Lützen, Napoleon would say: "These animals have learned something."

The war saw battles at Lützen, Bautzen, and Dresden. The even larger Battle of Leipzig was the largest battle fought in Europe until World War II. Despite experiencing a collapse in the army following the invasion of Russia, Napoleon managed to reorganise and stall the coalition, driving them out of Germany and compelling them to accept a truce. With their armies reorganized, the allies drove Napoleon out of Germany in 1813 and invaded France in 1814. Though it had experienced a second collapse after the battle of Leipzig, the French army managed to regroup and Napoleon struck the allies at the Battle of Brienne and the Battle of Saint-Dizier before his defeat at the Battle of La Rothiere, which motivated the coalition to march on Paris as they sensed Napoleon growing weaker. Napoleon then inflicted a series of successive defeats on the allies interrupted only by the (Battle of Laon), beginning with the Six Days' Campaign. After that, Napoleon launched an offensive against the army of Bohemia, driving them past Troyes. Following Marshal Marmont's pushing back of a second attempt by Prussia to march on Paris, Napoleon followed it up with the Battle of Craonne and the Battle of Reims, then driving back the Army of Bohemia until he lost momentum during the Battle of Arcis-sur-Aube where he was severely outnumbered. The Allies eventually overcame the French armies, occupied Paris after a stiff battle and forced Napoleon's first abdication in April 1814. Napoleon was exiled and the French monarchy was restored by the allies in the Bourbon Restoration. The Hundred Days began in 1815 when Napoleon escaped from his captivity on Elba and returned to power in France. He was defeated again for the final time at Waterloo, ending the Napoleonic Wars.

== Background: Invasion of Russia ==
In June 1812, Napoleon invaded Russia to compel Emperor Alexander I to remain in the Continental System. The Grande Armée, consisting of as many as 650,000 men (roughly half of whom were French, with the remainder coming from allies or subject areas), crossed the Neman river on 24 June 1812. Russia proclaimed a Patriotic War, while Napoleon proclaimed a "Second Polish War". But against the expectations of the Poles, who supplied almost 100,000 troops for the invasion force, and having in mind further negotiations with Russia, he avoided restoring the old Polish-Lithuanian Commonwealth. Russian forces fell back, destroying everything potentially of use to the invaders until giving battle at Borodino (7 September) where the two armies fought a devastating battle. Despite the fact that France won a tactical victory, the battle was inconclusive. Following the battle the Russians withdrew, thus opening the road to Moscow. By 14 September, the French had occupied Moscow but found the city practically empty. Alexander I (despite having almost lost the war by Western European standards) refused to capitulate, leaving the French in the abandoned city of Moscow with little food or shelter (large parts of Moscow had burned down) and winter approaching. In these circumstances, and with no clear path to victory, Napoleon was forced to withdraw from Moscow.

So began the disastrous Great Retreat, during which the retreating army came under increasing pressure due to lack of food, desertions, and increasingly harsh winter weather, all while under continual attack by the Russian army led by Commander-in-Chief Mikhail Kutuzov, and other militias. Total losses of the Grand Army were at least 370,000 casualties as a result of fighting, starvation and the freezing weather conditions, and 200,000 captured. By November, only 27,000 fit soldiers re-crossed the Berezina river. Napoleon now left his army to return to Paris and prepare a defence of the Duchy of Warsaw against the advancing Russians. The situation was not as dire as it might at first have seemed; the Russians had also lost around 400,000 men, and their army was similarly depleted. However, they had the advantage of shorter supply lines and were able to replenish their armies with greater speed than the French, especially because Napoleon's losses of cavalry and wagons were irreplaceable.

== Formation of the Sixth Coalition ==
=== Russia, Britain and Sweden form an alliance ===
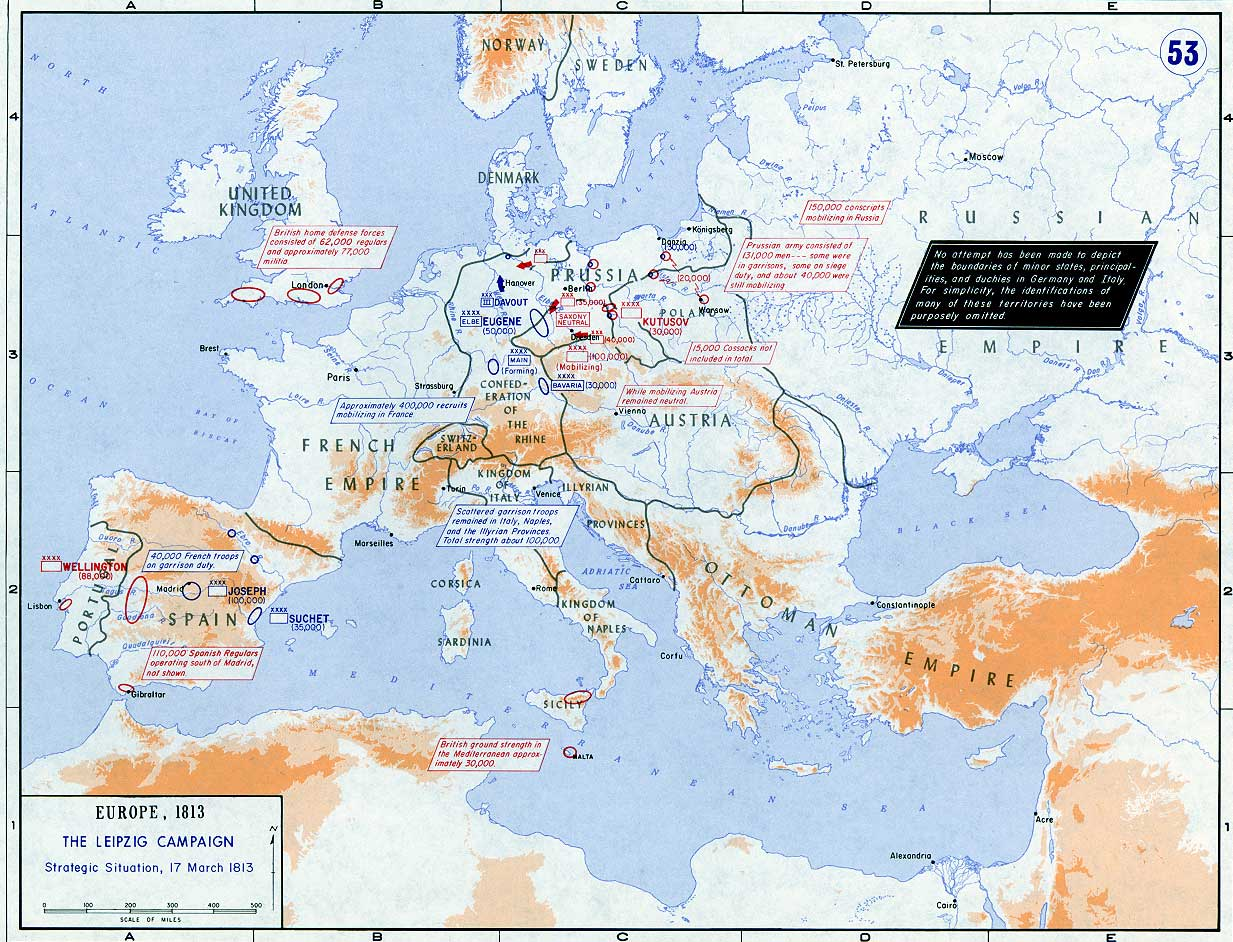
Strategic situation in Europe in 1813

At the beginning of 1812 Britain had already been at war with France since 1803, and had been fighting alongside the Portuguese and Spanish in the Peninsular War for more than three years. Russia and Sweden, which had opposed Napoleon up to 1807 and 1810 respectively, had been forced to join his Continental System against Britain, but continued to trade secretly with the British. On 9 January 1812, French troops suddenly occupied Swedish Pomerania, ostensibly to end trade between local smugglers and British merchants in violation of the Continental System. Swedish estates were confiscated and Swedish officers and soldiers were taken as prisoners.

In response, Charles John, formerly French Marshal Jean Baptiste Bernadotte, now the Crown Prince and Regent of Sweden, declared neutrality, and though Sweden was still at war with Britain, and Russia was its perennial enemy, he dispatched diplomats to London and St. Petersburg to create a new coalition against France. Sweden then signed the secret Treaty of Saint Petersburg with Russia against France and Denmark–Norway on 5 April 1812. On 18 July 1812, the Treaty of Örebro formally ended the wars between Britain and Sweden and Britain and Russia, forming the basis of coalition between Russia, Britain, and Sweden, though the exact parameters of a military alliance remained in negotiation throughout the winter of 1812–1813.

When Napoleon marched on Moscow in June 1812, neither Britain nor Sweden was able to give direct military support to Russia, though that same month the British, Portuguese and Spanish troops had advanced into central Spain, defeating the French at Salamanca and capturing Madrid, tying down 230,000 French-led troops. Britain also helped subsidize the Russian war effort while Charles John had struck up a friendship with Alexander, and gave him moral support, strategic and tactical advice on how to defeat the French, as well as valuable insights on Napoleon himself (having had much contact with Napoleon as a member of the extended Imperial Family). However Russia bore the brunt of the French onslaught on her territory alone. After the French Grande Armée retreated from Moscow on 18/19 October 1812 and suffered heavy casualties due to extreme cold, food shortages and repeated Russian attacks, Napoleon did not seem to be as invincible as before. On 14 December, the last French troops had left Russian soil, and Paris' allies were seriously considering rebellion and joining the Tsar's side.

=== Defection of Prussia ===
The Convention of Tauroggen was a truce signed 30 December 1812 at Tauroggen between Generalleutnant Ludwig Yorck von Wartenburg on behalf of his Prussian troops (who had been compelled to augment the Grande Armée during the invasion of Russia), and by General Hans Karl von Diebitsch of the Imperial Russian Army. According to the Treaty of Tilsit (9 July 1807), Prussia had to support Napoleon's invasion of Russia. This resulted in some Prussians leaving their army to avoid serving the French, like Carl von Clausewitz, who joined Russian service. When Yorck's immediate French superior Marshal MacDonald, retreated before the corps of Diebitsch, Yorck found himself isolated. As a soldier his duty was to break through, but as a Prussian patriot his position was more difficult. He had to judge whether the moment was favorable for starting a war of liberation; and, whatever might be the enthusiasm of his junior staff-officers, Yorck had no illusions as to the safety of his own head, and negotiated with Clausewitz. The Convention of Tauroggen armistice, signed by Diebitsch and Yorck, "neutralized" the Prussian corps without consent of their king. The news was received with the wildest enthusiasm in Prussia, but the Prussian Court dared not yet throw off the mask, and an order was despatched suspending Yorck from his command pending a court-martial. Diebitsch refused to let the bearer pass through his lines, and the general was finally absolved when the Treaty of Kalisch (28 February 1813) definitely ranged Prussia on the side of the Allies.

Meanwhile, Austria's alliance with France ended in February 1813, and Austria then moved to a position of armed neutrality. It would not declare war on France until half a year later, in August 1813.

=== Declarations of war ===
On 3 March 1813, after lengthy negotiations, the United Kingdom agreed to Swedish claims to Norway. Sweden entered a military alliance with the United Kingdom and declared war against France, liberating Swedish Pomerania shortly thereafter. On 17 March, King Frederick William III of Prussia published a call to arms to his subjects, An Mein Volk. Prussia had declared war on France on 13 March, which was received by the French on 16 March. The first armed conflict occurred on 5 April in the Battle of Möckern, where combined Prusso-Russian forces defeated French troops.

Meanwhile, Napoleon withdrew some 20,000 troops from the ongoing Peninsular War to reinforce his position in Central Europe, which left his Iberian forces weakened and vulnerable to Anglo–Spanish–Portuguese attacks. On 17 March 1813, his brother King Joseph Bonaparte of Spain withdrew from Madrid, a clear sign of losing control. Wellington led a 123,000-strong army across northern Spain, taking Burgos in late May, and decisively defeating Jourdan at the Battle of Vitoria on 21 June. Marshal Soult failed to turn the tide in his large-scale Battle of the Pyrenees (25 July to 2 August).

In June, the United Kingdom formally entered the coalition. Initially, Austria remained loyal to France, and foreign minister Metternich aimed to mediate in good faith a peace between France and its continental enemies, but it became apparent that the price was to be the dismantling of the Confederation of the Rhine, the Napoleon-controlled union of all German states aside from Prussia and Austria, and France's eastern border being set on the Rhine river. Napoleon was not interested in any such compromise that would in effect end his empire, so Austria joined the allies and declared war on France in August 1813.

== War in Germany ==
=== Spring campaign of 1813 ===
Napoleon vowed that he would create a new army as large as that he had sent into Russia, and quickly built up his forces in the east from 30,000 to 130,000 and eventually to 400,000. Napoleon inflicted 40,000 casualties on the Allies at Lützen (near Leipzig, 2 May) and Bautzen (20–21 May 1813) but his army lost about the same number of men during those encounters. Both battles involved total forces of over 250,000 – making them among the largest battles of the Napoleonic Wars to that point in time. The lack of horses for Napoleon's cavalry did not allow him to follow up his victories with a vigorous pursuit, robbing him of decisive results.

Despite losing as many men as the Allies, Napoleon's victories had greatly demoralized the Prussians and Russians. Losses were heavy, and the Russian and Prussian forces were a shambles. Both Allied armies were in dire need of substantial reinforcements en route from the east and from Prussian recruiting depots. Many Russian officers yearned to return to Russia having achieved their goal of ridding Russia of the French. Frederick William of Prussia had always viewed a renewed war with France as dubious, and the two defeats at Lützen and Bautzen had led him to reconsider peace. Moreover, the Prussians and the Russians were hopeful of bringing the Austrians into the war and a break in the fighting would give them time to negotiate with Vienna. Another victory by Napoleon may very well have led to a favorable peace as not only were the Russians and Prussians at their nadir, but the Austrians, with their 150,000 troops would have seen a decisive French victory as ample proof that another war with France would be most undesirable.

Despite the two victories over the Prussians and Russians, French losses had been heavy and a chronic lack of horses for his cavalry meant that Napoleon could not fully exploit his victories and inflict a decisive defeat in the same vein as Austerlitz or Friedland. Napoleon's new army was filled with fresh conscripts, lacked many necessities and was exhausted from their long march from France and Napoleon's rapid maneuvering. The French were "in dire need of a period of reconstruction and recuperation" and Napoleon needed time to acquire horses for his depleted cavalry and bring up more reinforcements. Therefore, Napoleon was amiable to the armistice offered by the Allies despite the Allies being in a grave condition. During the armistice, a disastrous interview with Austrian Chancellor Metternich, in which Napoleon heaped recriminations on the Austrians and threw his hat to the ground and stamped it with his foot, ensured that Austria would join the coalition against France. Napoleon did not know it at the time, but the armistice would turn out to be a grave mistake as the Allies gained far more from the suspension of hostilities than he did.

Meanwhile, on 21 May 1813, a Swedish corps of 15,000 commanded by General Döbeln occupied Hamburg without orders from Bernadotte, following a Danish declaration that they would hold the city for Napoleon, irrevocably binding Denmark to France, an action that would guarantee full Swedish cooperation in North Germany. The Swedish occupation of Hamburg came as welcome news to the Allies, insofar as holding a wealthy center of finance was a blow against Napoleon. However, Bernadotte's initial misgivings at extending his troops so far from the Allied lines, with British General Hope calling Döbeln, who was later court-martialed for disobeying orders "the mad Swedish General", were validated when Marshal Davout approached Hamburg with a French force of 34,000, intent on retaking the city. The Swedes quietly withdrew on 26 May and Davout would occupy the city until after Napoleon's first abdication in 1814. It would be the last major action of the spring before the Armistice of Pläswitz.

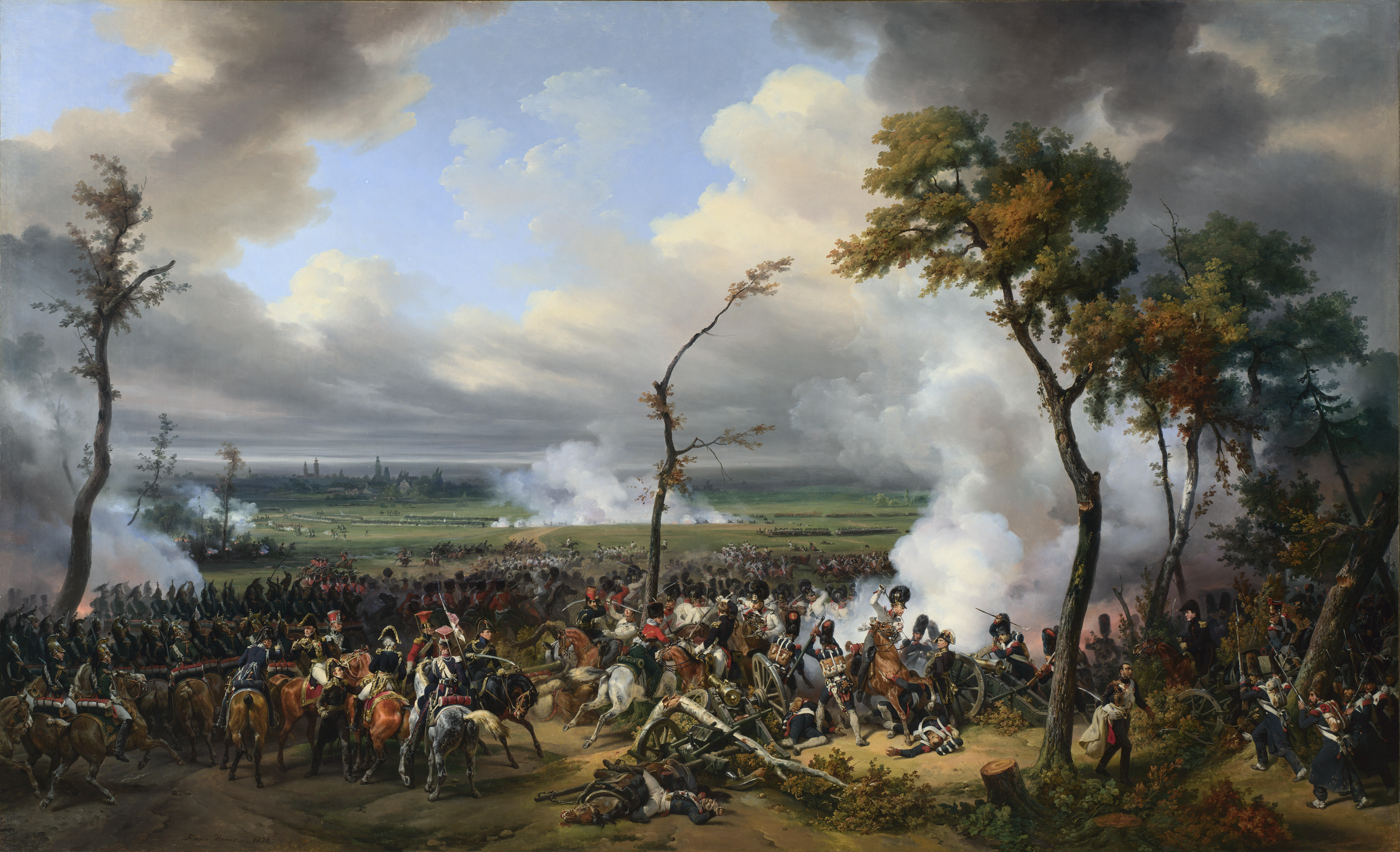
The Battle of Hanau by Horace Vernet, 1824. Napoleon defeated a Bavarian force and their Austrian allies under Marshal Wrede at the Battle of Hanau in late October 1813.

=== Armistice of Pläswitz; Austria joins the Coalition and creation of the Trachenberg Plan ===
The belligerents declared an armistice from 4 June 1813 which lasted until 13 August, during which time both sides attempted to recover from approximately a quarter of a million losses since April. During this time Allied negotiations finally brought Austria out in open opposition to France (like Prussia, Austria had moved from nominal ally of France in 1812 to armed neutral in 1813). Two principal Austrian armies deployed in Bohemia and Northern Italy, adding 300,000 troops to the Allied armies. In total the Allies now had around 800,000 frontline troops in the German theatre, with a strategic reserve of 350,000. As a consequence of the armistice, the French lost their initial advantage in numbers as the Austrians, and Russia's huge manpower reserves, were brought to the front.

Napoleon succeeded in bringing the total imperial forces in the region up to around 650,000 (although only 250,000 were under his direct command, with another 120,000 under Nicolas Charles Oudinot and 30,000 under Davout). The Confederation of the Rhine furnished Napoleon with the bulk of the remainder of the forces, with Saxony and Bavaria as principal contributors. In addition, to the south, Murat's Kingdom of Naples and Eugène de Beauharnais's Kingdom of Italy had a combined total of 100,000 men under arms. In Spain an additional 150–200,000 French troops were being steadily beaten back by British, Spanish, and Portuguese forces. Thus in total around 900,000 French troops were opposed in all theatres by somewhere around a million Allied troops (not including the strategic reserve being formed in Germany).

During the armistice, three Allied sovereigns, Alexander of Russia, Frederick William of Prussia, and Carl Johan of Sweden (by then Regent of the kingdom due to his adoptive father's illness) met at Trachenberg Castle in Silesia to coordinate the war effort. Allied staffs began creating a plan for the campaign wherein Bernadotte once again put to use his fifteen years of experience as a French general as well as his familiarity with Napoleon. The result was the Trachenberg Plan, authored primarily by Carl Johan of Sweden and the Austrian Chief of Staff, Field-Marshal Lieutenant Joseph Radetzky, that sought to wear down the French using a Fabian strategy, avoiding direct combat with Napoleon, engaging and defeating his marshals whenever possible and slowly encircling the French with three independent armies until the French Emperor could be cornered and brought to battle against vastly superior numbers.

Following the conference, the Allies stood up their main field armies, totaling 512,000 in the first line and 350,000 in the second line (in reserve or besieging French garrisons). The Army of Silesia, commanded by Field Marshal Gebhard von Blücher, had 105,000 troops; the Army of the North numbered 125,000 Prussians, Russians, Swedes, and German troops from Mecklenburg, the Hanseatic cities and North Germany, under the independent command of Sweden's Crown Prince Carl Johan; and the Army of Bohemia, the primary Allied force in the field, with which the Allied sovereigns Alexander, Francis and Frederick William oversaw the Campaign, numbered 257,000 Austrians, Russians, and Prussians commanded by Prince Karl von Schwarzenberg. The Army of Poland had 60,000 Russians. By nationality, the frontline consisted of 184,000 Russians, 162,000 Prussians, 127,000 Austrians, 39,000 Swedes, and 9,000 other Germans. In the Iberian theater, another 129,000 coalition soldiers (52,484 British, 46,292 Spanish, and 28,792 Portuguese, the latter two forces under British command and subsidy) were on the offensive against 200,000 French, with more coalition (mainly Spanish) troops available in reserve.

=== Renewal of hostilities; French losses and defecting allies ===
Following the end of the armistice, Napoleon seemed to have regained the initiative at Dresden (26–27 August 1813), where he inflicted one of the most lop-sided losses of the era on the Prussian-Russian-Austrian forces. On 26 August, the Allies under Prince von Schwarzenberg attacked the French garrison in Dresden. Napoleon arrived on the battlefield in the early hours of 27 August with the Guard and other reinforcements and despite being severely outnumbered having only 135,000 men to the Coalition's 215,000, Napoleon chose to attack the Allies. Napoleon turned the Allied Left Flank, and in skilful use of terrain, pinned it against the flooded Weißeritz river and isolated it from the rest of the Coalition Army. He then gave his famed cavalry commander, and King of Naples, Joachim Murat leave to destroy the surrounded Austrians. The day's torrential rain had dampened gunpowder, rendering the Austrians' muskets and cannon useless against the sabers and lances of Murat's Cuirassiers and Lancers who tore the Austrians to shreds, capturing 15 standards and forcing the balance of three divisions, 13,000 men, to surrender.

The Allies were forced to retreat in some disorder having lost nearly 40,000 men to only 10,000 French. However, Napoleon's forces were also hampered by the weather and unable to close the encirclement the Emperor had planned before the Allies narrowly slipped the noose. So while Napoleon had struck a heavy blow against the Allies, several tactical errors had allowed the Allies to withdraw, thus ruining Napoleon's best chance at ending the war in a single battle. Nonetheless, Napoleon had once again inflicted a heavy loss on the primary Allied Army despite being outnumbered and for some weeks after Dresden Schwarzenberg declined to take offensive action.

However at about the same time the French sustained several serious defeats, first at the hands of Bernadotte's Army of the North on 23 August, with Oudinot's thrust towards Berlin beaten back by the Prussians, at Großbeeren. At the Katzbach the Prussians, commanded by Blücher, took advantage of Napoleon's march toward Dresden to attack Marshal MacDonald's Army of the Bober. During a torrential rainstorm on 26 August, and due to conflicting orders and a breakdown of communications, MacDonald's several corps found themselves isolated from one another with many bridges over the Katzbach and Neisse rivers destroyed by surging waters. 200,000 Prussians and French collided in a confused battle that degenerated into hand-to-hand combat. However, Blücher and the Prussians rallied their scattered units and attacked an isolated French corps and pinned it against the Katzbach, annihilating it; forcing the French into the raging waters where many drowned. The French suffered 13,000 killed and wounded and 20,000 captured. The Prussians lost but 4,000 men.

Napoleon himself, lacking reliable and numerous cavalry, was unable to prevent the destruction of a whole army corps, which had isolated itself pursuing the enemy following the Battle of Dresden without support, at the Battle of Kulm (29–30 August 1813), losing 13,000 men further weakening his army. Realizing that the Allies would continue to defeat his subordinates, Napoleon began to consolidate his troops to force a decisive battle.

The French then suffered another grievous loss at the hands of Bernadotte's army on 6 September at Dennewitz where Ney was now in command, with Oudinot now as his deputy. The French were once again attempting to capture Berlin, the loss of which Napoleon believed would knock Prussia out of the War. However, Ney blundered into a trap set by Bernadotte and was stopped cold by the Prussians, and then routed when the Crown Prince arrived with his Swedes and a Russian corps on their open flank. This second defeat at the hands of Napoleon's ex-Marshal was catastrophic for the French, with them losing 50 cannon, four Eagles and 10,000 men on the field. Further losses occurred during the pursuit that evening, and into the following day, as the Swedish and Prussian cavalry took a further 13,000–14,000 French prisoners. Ney retreated to Wittenberg with the remains of his command and made no further attempt at capturing Berlin. Napoleon's bid to knock Prussia out of the war had failed; as had his operational plan to fight the battle of the central position. Having lost the initiative, he was now forced to concentrate his army and seek a decisive battle at Leipzig.

Compounding the heavy military losses suffered at Dennewitz, the French were now losing the support of their German vassal states as well. News of Bernadotte's victory at Dennewitz sent shock waves across Germany, where French rule had become unpopular, inducing Tyrol to rise in rebellion and was the signal for the King of Bavaria to proclaim neutrality and begin negotiations with the Austrians (on the basis of territorial guarantees and Maximilian's retention of his crown) in preparation of joining the Allied cause. A body of Saxon troops had defected to Bernadotte's Army during the battle and Westphalian troops were now deserting King Jérôme's army in large numbers. Following a proclamation by the Swedish Crown Prince urging the Saxon Army (Bernadotte had commanded the Saxon Army at the Battle of Wagram and was well liked by them) to come over to the Allied cause, Saxon generals could no longer answer for the fidelity of their troops and the French now considered their remaining German allies unreliable. Later, on 8 October 1813, Bavaria officially ranged itself against Napoleon as a member of the Coalition.

=== Battle of Leipzig and the Frankfurt peace proposals ===
Napoleon withdrew with around 175,000 troops to Leipzig in Saxony where he thought he could fight a defensive action against the Allied armies converging on him. There, at the so-called Battle of Nations (16–19 October 1813) a French army, ultimately reinforced to 191,000, found itself faced by three Allied armies converging on it, ultimately totalling more than 430,000 troops. Over the following days the battle resulted in a defeat for Napoleon, who however was still able to manage a relatively orderly retreat westwards. However, as the French forces were pulling across the White Elster, the bridge was prematurely blown and 30,000 troops were stranded to be taken prisoner by the Allied forces.

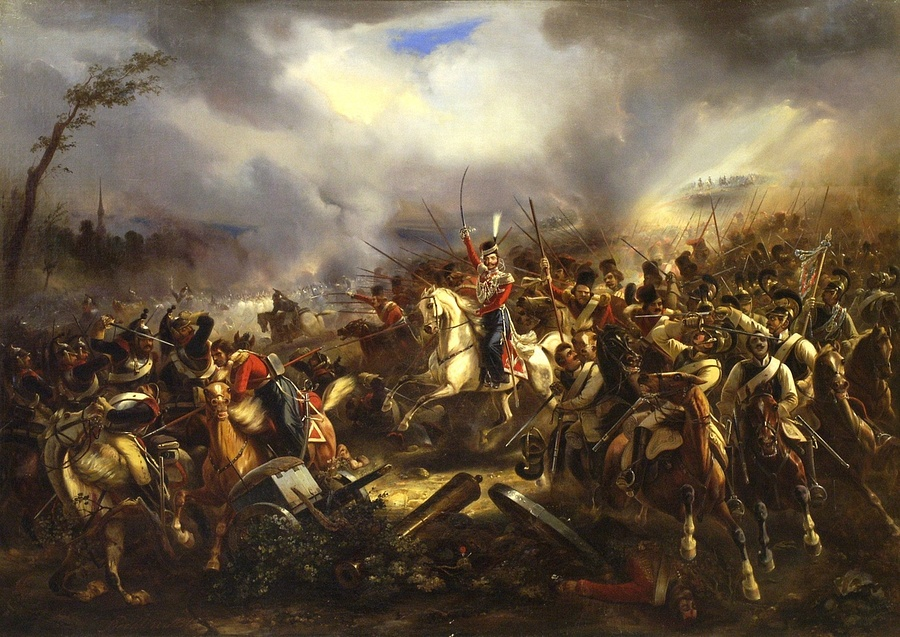
The charge of the Life Guards Cossacks at Leipzig

Napoleon defeated an army of his former ally Bavaria at the Battle of Hanau (30–31 October 1813) before pulling what was left of his forces back into France. Meanwhile, Davout's corps continued to hold out in its Siege of Hamburg, where it became the last Imperial field force east of the Rhine.

The Allies offered peace terms in the Frankfurt proposals in November 1813. Napoleon would remain as Emperor of France, but it would be reduced to its "natural frontiers". That meant that France could retain control of Belgium, Savoy and the Rhineland (the west bank of the Rhine river), while giving up control of all the rest, including all of Poland, Spain and the Netherlands, and most of Italy and Germany. Metternich told Napoleon these were the best terms the Allies were likely to offer; after further victories, the terms would be harsher and harsher. Metternich aimed to maintain France as a balance against Russian threats, while ending the highly destabilizing series of wars.

Napoleon, expecting to win the war, delayed too long and lost this opportunity; by December the Allies had withdrawn the offer. When his back was to the wall in 1814 he tried to reopen peace negotiations on the basis of accepting the Frankfurt proposals. The Allies now had new, harsher terms that included the retreat of France to its 1791 boundaries, which meant the loss of Belgium and the Rhineland. Napoleon adamantly refused.

== War in Denmark and Norway ==
=== Swedish invasion of Denmark and the liberation of northern Germany and the Low Countries ===
Following the Battle of Leipzig, Bernadotte and his Army of the North parted ways with the rest of the Coalition armies, and liberated Bremen and Lübeck in late November 1813. In early December, Bernadotte launched his long projected invasion of Denmark to secure the Coalition's northern flank prior to the invasion of France scheduled for early 1814 and to see the treaty guarantees over the Danish cession of Norway to Sweden enforced. Bernadotte's Army, now some 65,000, composed only of Swedish, North German and Russian troops following the secondment of the Prussian troops to Blücher's army, attacked the Royal Danish Army in Holstein. In a lightning campaign of only two weeks the Swedes subdued the Danes.

General Anders Skjöldebrand defeated the Danes at Bornhöved on 7 December 1813. Three days later, the Danish Auxiliary Corps scored a minor victory at Sehested. However, while the Danish victory managed to ensure the retreat of the main Danish army from immediate destruction, and brought about a three-week armistice, it could not change the course of war. Following a breakdown of negotiations, the armistice concluded and on 14 January 1814 Bernadotte invaded Schleswig, swiftly invested and reduced its fortresses and occupied the entire province. The Danes, heavily outnumbered, could not prevent an Allied advance on Jutland or Copenhagen, and sued for peace. It would be the final chapter in the long and bloody history of conflicts between Sweden and Denmark with the former definitively victorious.

On 14 January 1814, the Treaty of Kiel was concluded between Sweden and Denmark–Norway. By the terms of the treaty, the Kingdom of Norway was to be ceded to the King of Sweden. Believing his primary goal of detaching Norway from Denmark and binding it with Sweden had been fully achieved, Bernadotte and the Swedish and Russian corps of his Army of the North advanced into and occupied the Low Countries. Other elements of the Army of the North were also tasked with besieging Marshal Davout's 40,000 French and Danish troops in Hamburg, as well as the 100,000 French troops still garrisoned in fortresses throughout northern Germany. Despite several attempts by the Russian General Bennigsen to storm the city, Marshal Davout held Hamburg for France until after Napoleon's abdication in April 1814.

=== Final battles of the war: Sweden's Norwegian campaign ===
However, whilst Bernadotte cleared the Low Countries of the French in spring 1814, the people of Norway objected to being bartered between kings, declared independence and adopted their own constitution on 17 May 1814. Even as fighting between the Coalition and France ended with Napoleon's abdication, codified in the Treaty of Fontainbleau on 11 April 1814, Bernadotte found himself planning and leading yet another campaign to see the results of the Treaty of Kiel fully realized. It would be the final campaign of the War of the Sixth Coalition.

On 27 July 1814, Bernadotte, supported by the Swedish and British fleets, invaded Norway on two fronts, intending to envelop the Norwegian forces with a combined Swedish army of 40,000 well-trained, well-equipped men, many of whom were veterans of the recent Leipzig and Danish Campaigns. Facing them were 30,000 Norwegian militia, who were short on equipment, training and munitions, but full of patriotic ardor and acquitted themselves well in the face of overwhelming odds.

The Norwegians fought well, winning defensive battles at Lier and Matrand, but could not stop the advancing Swedish columns. As a consequence, an armistice (the Convention of Moss) was concluded on 14 August followed by swift negotiations. The terms of Union were generous to the Norwegians as Bernadotte and the Swedes had no wish to inaugurate the union of Sweden and Norway with further bloodshed. Norway agreed to enter into a personal union with Sweden as a separate state with its own constitution and institutions, except for the common king and foreign service. The Union between Sweden and Norway was formally established on 4 November 1814, when the Storting adopted the necessary constitutional amendments, and elected Charles XIII of Sweden as King of Norway.

The Convention of Moss, signed on 14 August 1814, concluded the last active campaign of the War of the Sixth Coalition.

== Peninsular War ==
While events unfolded in the East, the Peninsular War in Iberia continued to be Napoleon's "Spanish ulcer" tying down hundreds of thousands of French soldiers. In 1813, Arthur Wellesley, 1st Duke of Wellington, finally broke the French power in Spain and forced the French to retreat. In a strategic move, Wellington planned to move his supply base from Lisbon to Santander. The Anglo-Portuguese forces swept northwards in late May and seized Burgos; they then outflanked the French army, forcing Joseph Bonaparte into the valley of the River Zadorra. At the Battle of Vitoria, 21 June, the 65,000 French under Joseph were routed by 53,000 British, 27,000 Portuguese and 19,000 Spaniards. Wellington pursued and dislodged the French from San Sebastián, which was sacked and burnt after a siege.

The allies chased the retreating French, reaching the Pyrenees in early July. Marshal Soult was given command of the French forces and began a counter-offensive, dealing the allied generals two sharp defeats at the Battle of Maya and the Battle of Roncesvalles. Yet, he was put again onto the defensive by the British army and its Portuguese allies, lost momentum, and finally fled after the allied victory at the Battle of Sorauren (28 and 30 July).

At the Battle of the Pyrenees, Wellington fought far from his supply line but won with a mixture of manoeuvre, shock and persistent hounding of the French forces.

On 7 October, after Wellington received news of the reopening of hostilities in Germany, the Coalition allies finally crossed into France, fording the Bidasoa river. On 11 December, a beleaguered and desperate Napoleon agreed to a separate peace with Spain under the Treaty of Valençay, under which he would release and recognize Ferdinand VII as King of Spain in exchange for a complete cessation of hostilities. But the Spanish had no intention of trusting Napoleon, and the fighting continued on into France.

== War in France ==
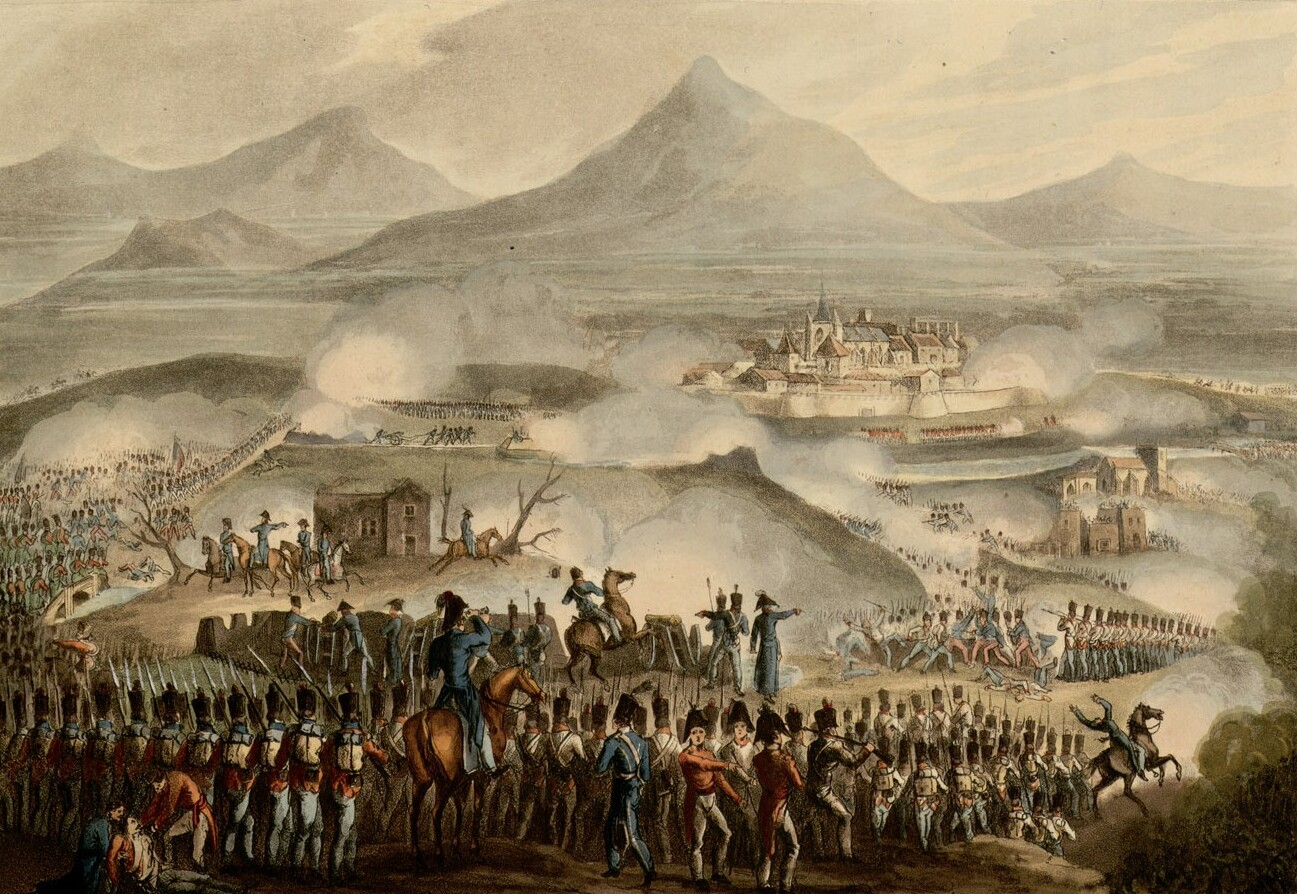
The Battle of Toulouse, 10 April 1814 by William Heath

During the last months of 1813 and into 1814, Wellington led the Peninsular army into south-west France and fought a number of battles against Marshals Soult and Suchet. The Peninsular army gained victories at Vera pass, the Battle of Nivelle, the Battle of Nive near Bayonne (10–14 December 1813), the Battle of Orthez (27 February 1814) and the Battle of Toulouse (10 April). (Note: There was one last bloody engagement in southwest France, when under the orders of Thouvenot, the French sortied from Toulouse and fought the Battle of Bayonne (14 April 1814).)

After retreating from Germany, Napoleon fought a series of battles, including the Battle of Arcis-sur-Aube, in France, but was steadily forced back against overwhelming odds. During the campaign he had issued a decree for 900,000 fresh conscripts, but only a fraction of these were ever raised. In early February Napoleon fought his Six Days' Campaign, in which he won multiple battles against numerically superior enemy forces marching on Paris. However, he fielded less than 80,000 soldiers during this entire campaign against a Coalition force of between 370,000 and 405,000 engaged in the campaign. (Note: Hodgson gives no size for the Army of the North but estimates the Austrian Grand Army have 10,000 and the Army of Silesia 25,000 more men than Maud.) At the Treaty of Chaumont (9 March) the Allies agreed to preserve the Coalition until Napoleon's total defeat. After defeating the French on the outskirts of Paris, on 31 March the Coalition armies entered the city with Tsar Alexander I at the head of the army followed by the King of Prussia and Prince Schwarzenberg. On 2 April the French Senate passed the Acte de déchéance de l'Empereur, which declared Napoleon deposed.

== Aftermath ==
Napoleon was determined to fight on, proposing to march on Paris. His soldiers and regimental officers were eager to fight on. But Napoleon's marshals and senior officers mutinied. On 4 April, at Fontainebleau, Napoleon was confronted by his marshals and senior officers, led by Ney. They told the Emperor that they refused to march. Napoleon asserted that the army would follow him. Ney replied, "the army will obey its chiefs".

Napoleon abdicated on 11 April 1814 and the war officially ended soon after, although some fighting continued until May. The Treaty of Fontainebleau was signed on 11 April 1814 between the continental powers and Napoleon, followed by the Treaty of Paris on 30 May 1814 between France and the Great Powers including Britain. The victors exiled Napoleon to the island of Elba, and restored the Bourbon monarchy in the person of Louis XVIII. The Allied leaders attended Peace Celebrations in England in June, before progressing to the Congress of Vienna (between September 1814 and June 1815), which was held to redraw the map of Europe.

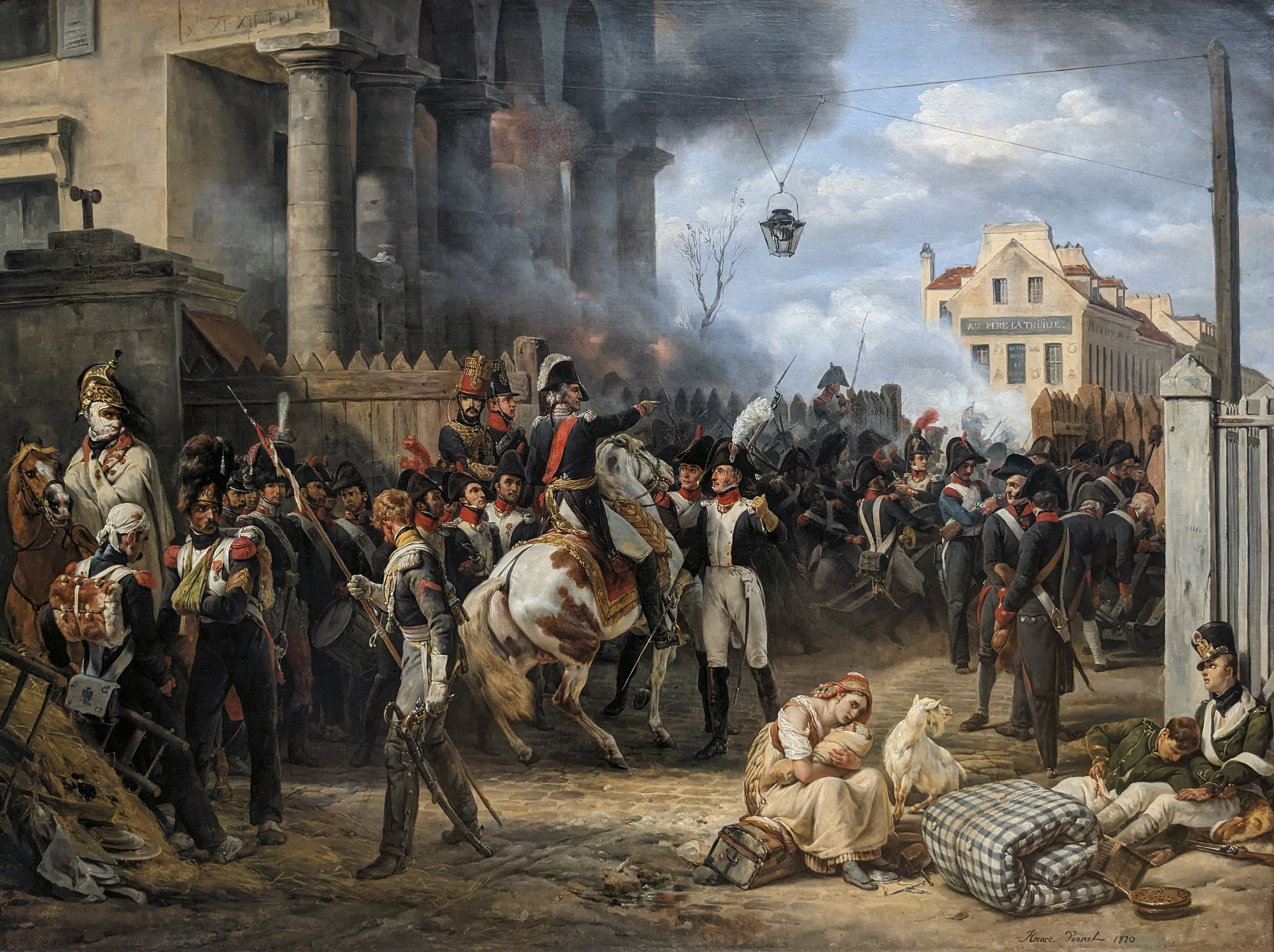
The Battle of Paris, by Horace Vernet

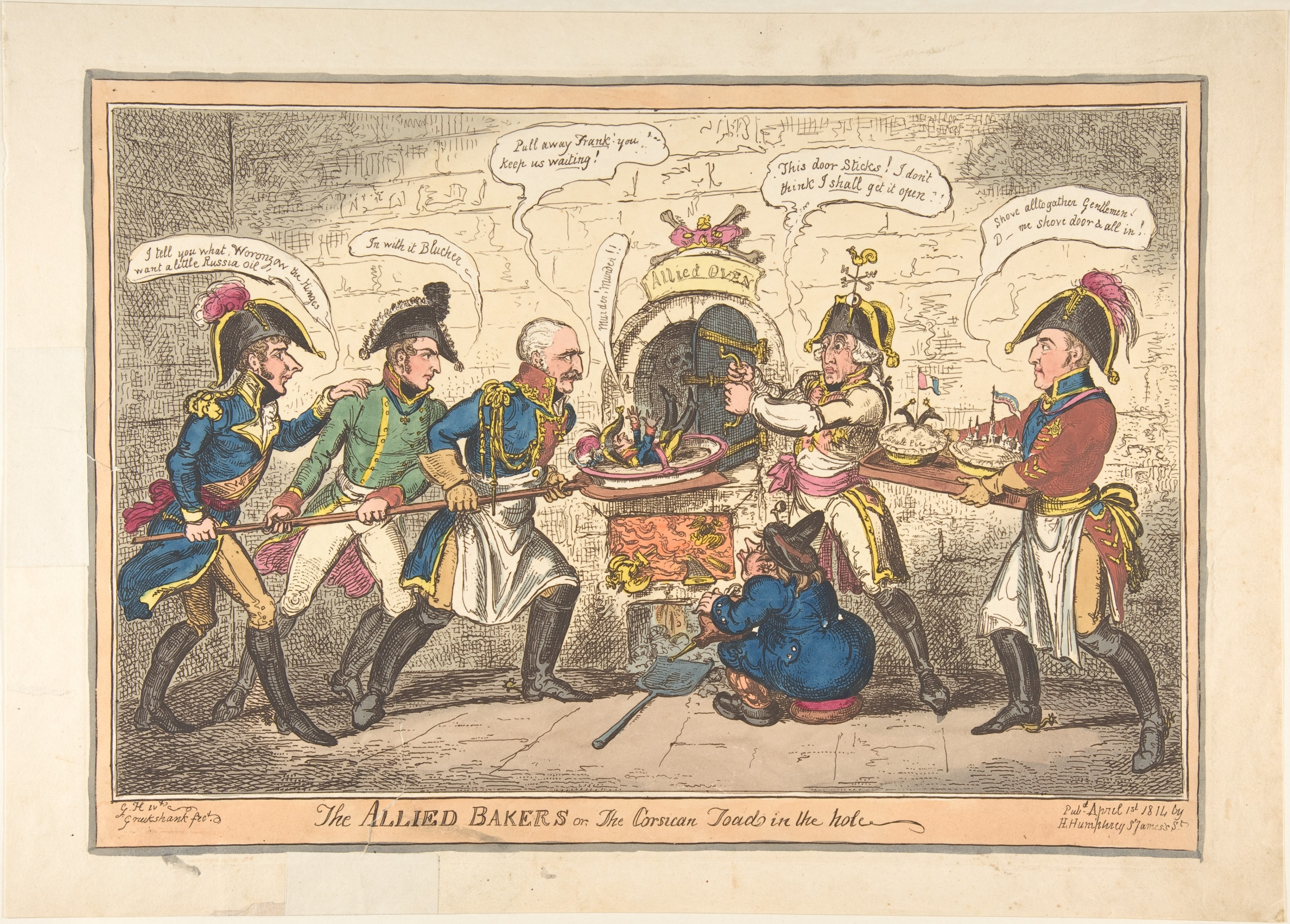
The Allied Bakers, by George Cruikshank, 1814

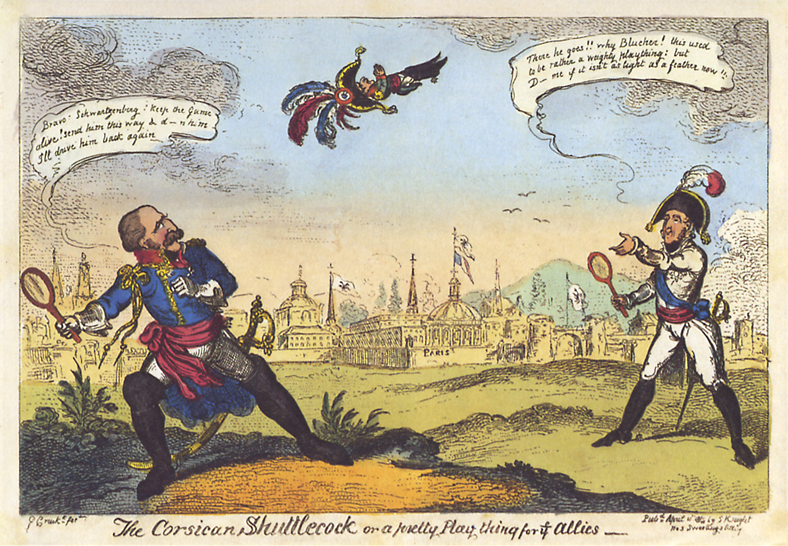
The Corsican Shuttlecock, by George Cruikshank, 1814

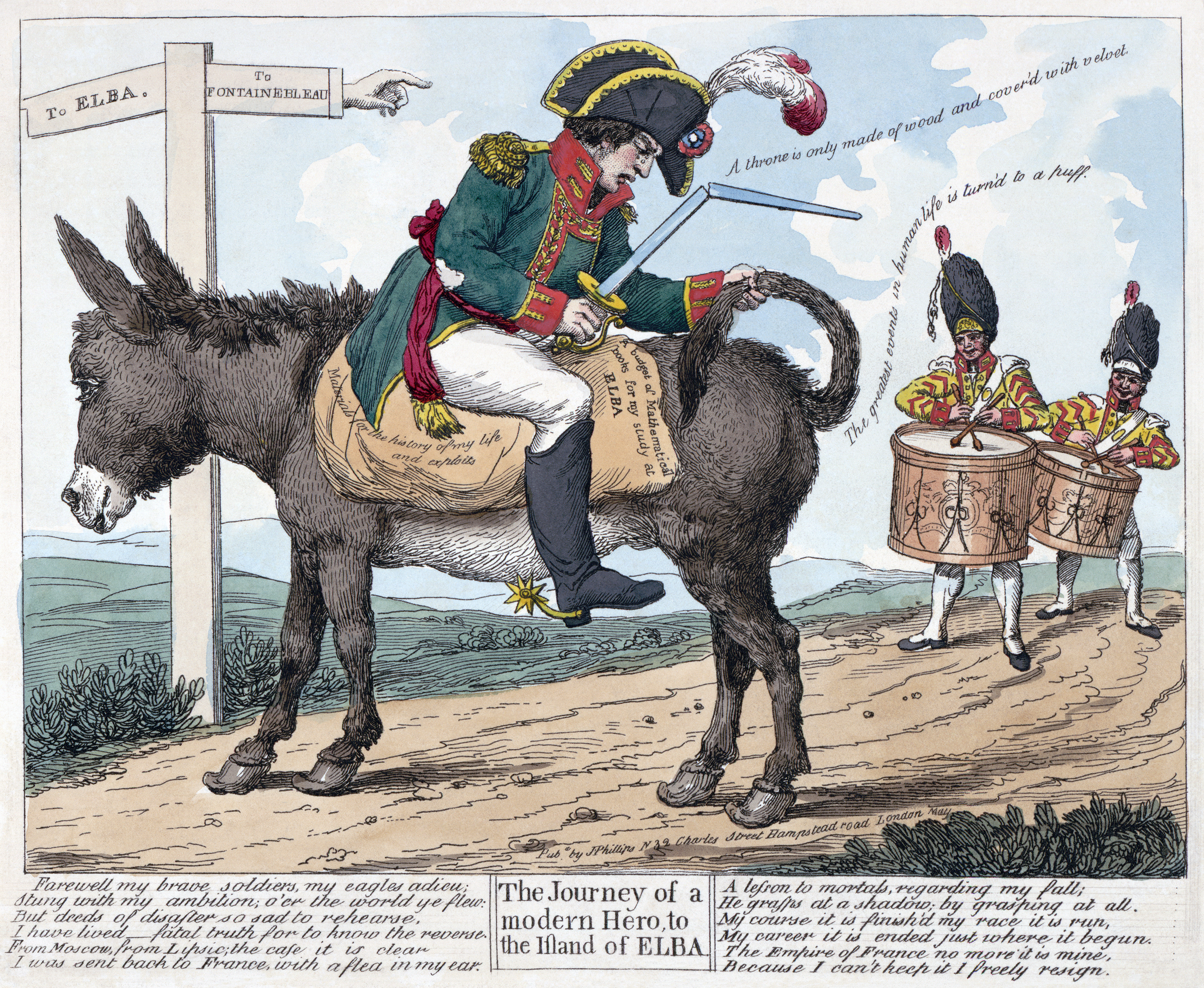
Napoleon's exile to Elba, from a British engraving, 1814

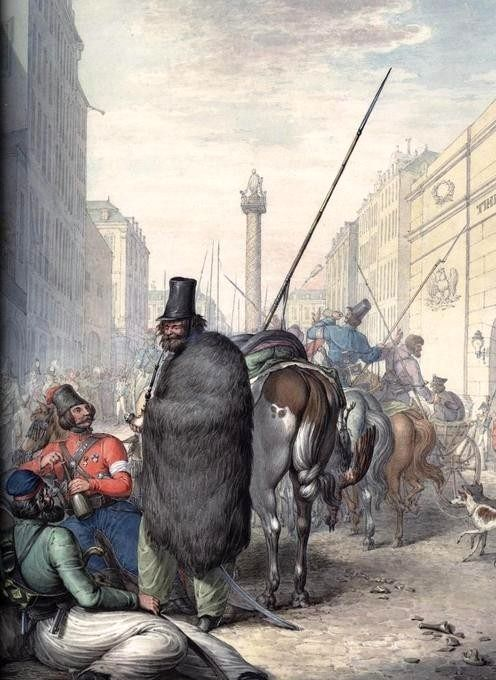
Russian Cossacks in Paris in 1814

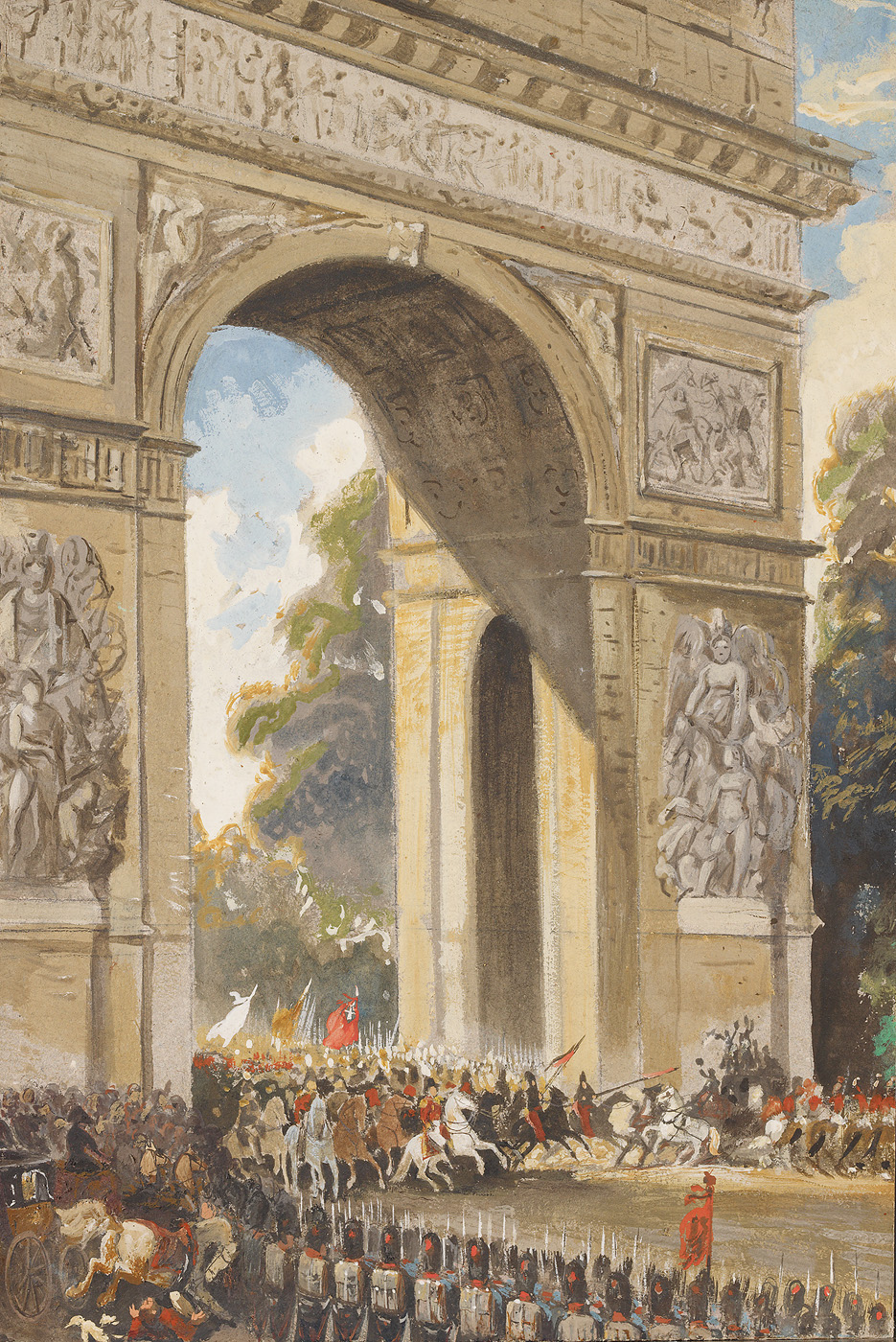
1814, Allied troops march through Paris, by Nicolaas Pieneman

== See also ==
- War of the Fifth Coalition
- Coalition forces of the Napoleonic Wars
- List of battles during the Campaign of France
