= Battle of Hanau =

1813 battle during the War of the Sixth Coalition

- Part of the German campaign of the Sixth Coalition
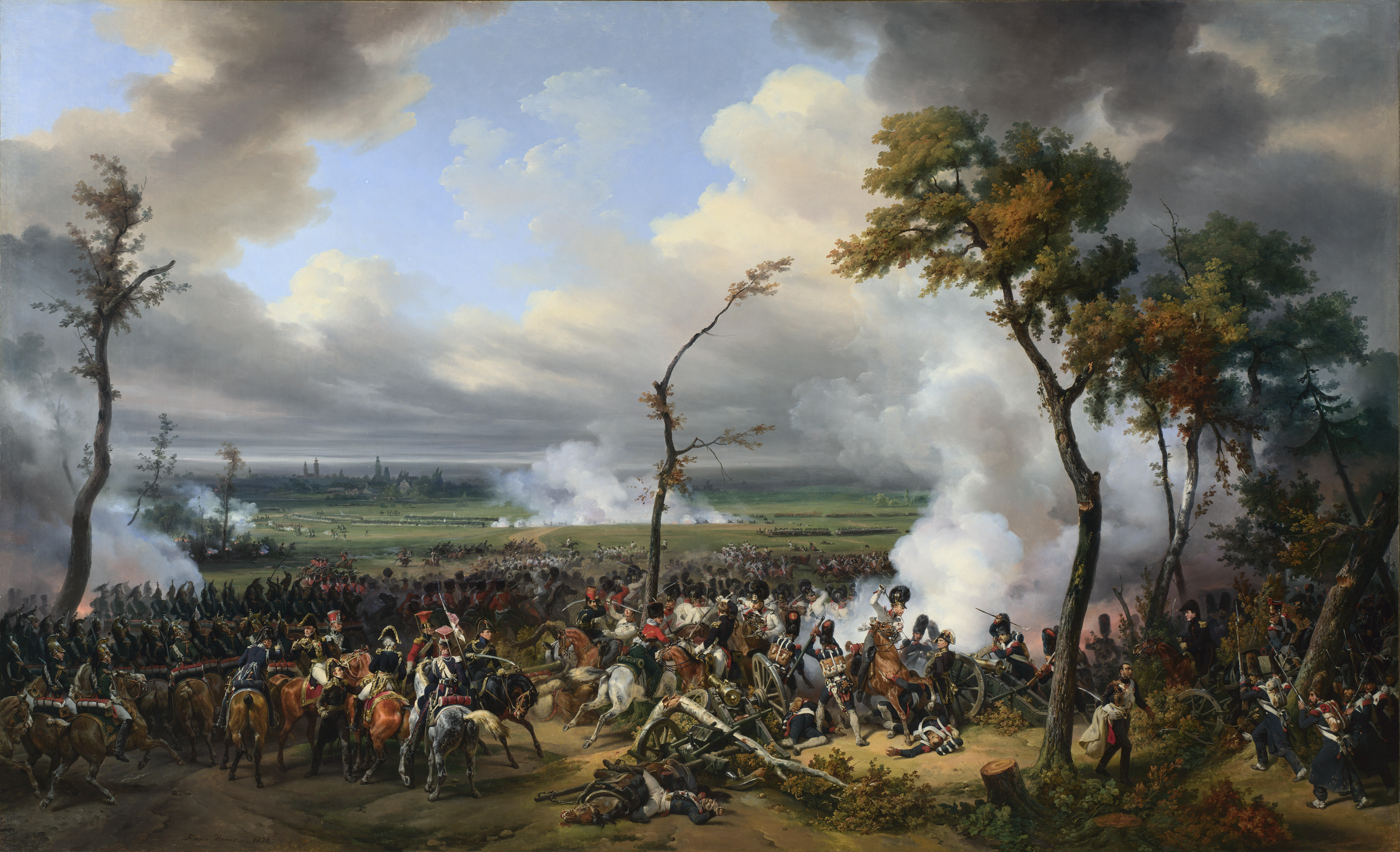
- The Battle of Hanau by Horace Vernet, 1824
Date	30–31 October 1813
Location	Hanau, Duchy of Frankfurt 50.1331°N 8.9169°E
Result	French victory

Belligerents
France	Bavaria; Austria

Commanders and leaders
Napoleon I	Karl von Wrede

Strength
17,000–30,000	43,000

Casualties and losses
4,500–5,000 killed and wounded	6,000 killed and wounded 4,000 captured
- Location within Europe

War of the Sixth Coalition:
German campaign
current battle
Napoleon in command
Napoleon not in command

The Battle of Hanau was fought from 30 to 31 October 1813 between Karl Philipp von Wrede's Austro-Bavarian corps and Napoleons retreating French during the War of the Sixth Coalition. Following his defeat at the Battle of Leipzig earlier in October, Napoleon began to retreat from Germany into France in relative safety. Wrede attempted to block the French line of retreat at Hanau on 30 October. Napoleon arrived at Hanau with reinforcements and defeated Wrede's forces. On 31 October Hanau was in French control, opening Napoleon's line of retreat.

The Battle of Hanau was an important tactical victory allowing Napoleon's depleted army to retreat onto French soil to prepare to face an invasion of France.

== Background ==
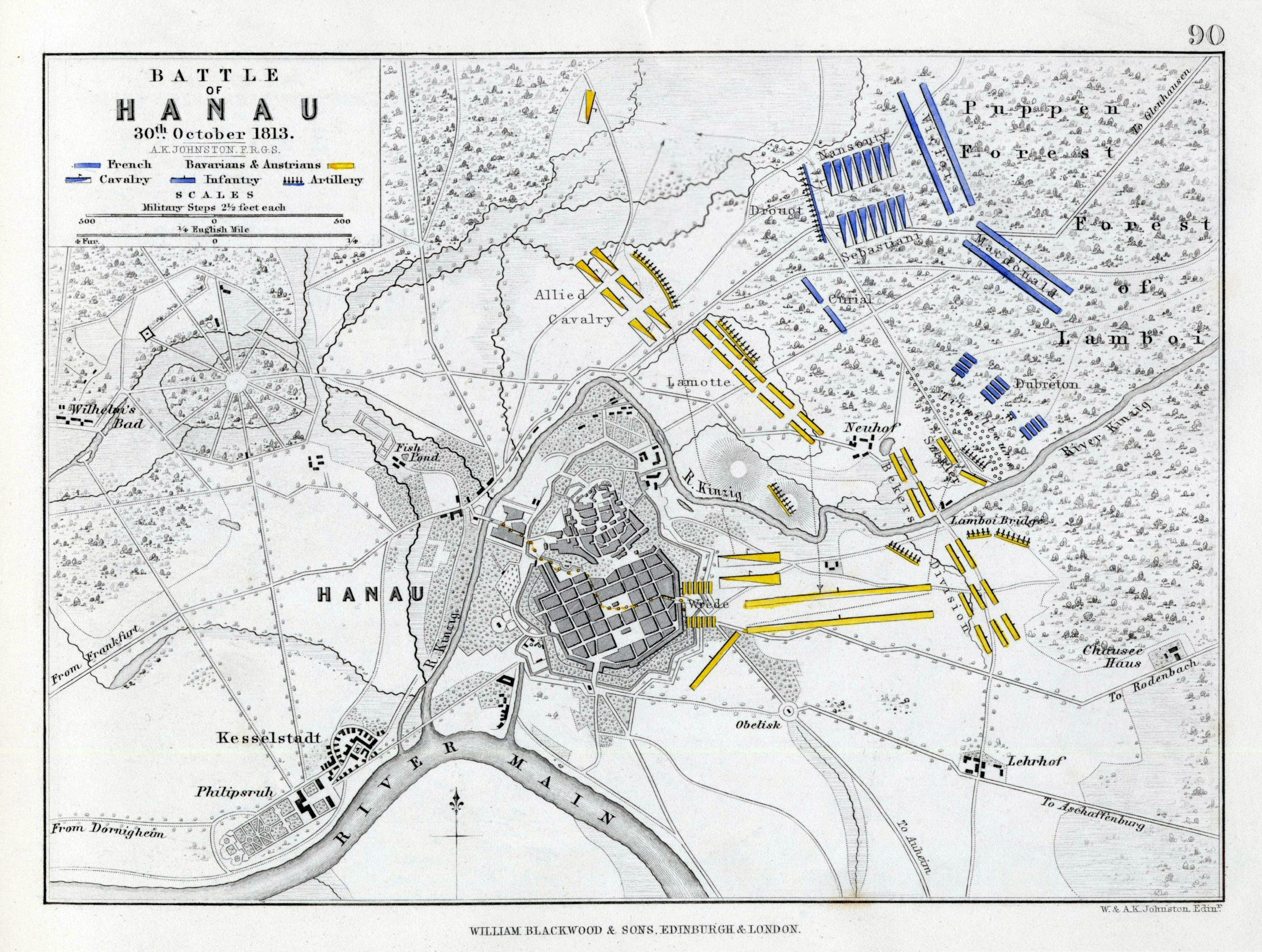
Plan of the Battle of Hanau

The Battle of Leipzig, the largest and bloodiest encounter of the Napoleonic Wars, began on 16 October 1813, raged for three days and ended with a decisive victory for the Sixth Coalition. Napoleon was forced to abandon central Germany to the coalition and hastily retreated westwards. His strategy was to regroup all his available forces on the shores of the Rhine, where his lines of communication would be shorter and his rear less likely to be threatened. The Emperor's concern was that his already battered army might be forced to fight against superior forces again, so he ordered that the retreat be carried out at great speed. Had the coalition managed to advance with more vigour in the days following the Battle of Leipzig, the already disorganised French army would probably have been destroyed, but the coalition armies themselves had suffered such high losses at Leipzig that they were in no position to launch an effective pursuit. With military action confined to secondary rearguard actions, Napoleon was able to install his headquarters at Erfurt on 23 October and began to reorganise his forces. On 26 October, he sent orders to the various corps, directing them to Frankfurt via Eisenach and Fulda. Their assigned destination was the city of Mainz, by the Rhine river.

The coalition was buoyed by the news that Bavaria, a former French ally, agreed to join the Sixth Coalition according to the Treaty of Ried concluded just before the Battle of Leipzig. This allowed the coalition to threaten the overall military position of the French by moving a 45,000 - 50,000 Austro-Bavarian army, under the command of Karl Philipp von Wrede, into Napoleon's rear, occupying Würzburg in Franconia. The small French garrison of Würzburg did not try to resist and instead barricaded themselves at the local citadel, allowing the enemy to occupy the town without a fight. From Würzburg, Wrede moved towards the strategic city of Hanau, along one of Napoleon's main retreat routes. Wrede’s advance guard reached Hanau on 28 October and took possession of the city, blocking Napoleon’s route to Frankfurt. Although Wrede probably assumed that the main part of the French forces was retreating along a more northerly road to Coblenz and thus expected to face a force of only 20,000 men, he did entertain hopes that he would be able to play a major role in the defeat of Napoleon. He also believed that the French army was completely disorganised, which was not true, and was closely followed by the main coalition army, the "Army of Bohemia", which was in reality much further away and not really in close contact with Napoleon's forces.

== Order of battle ==
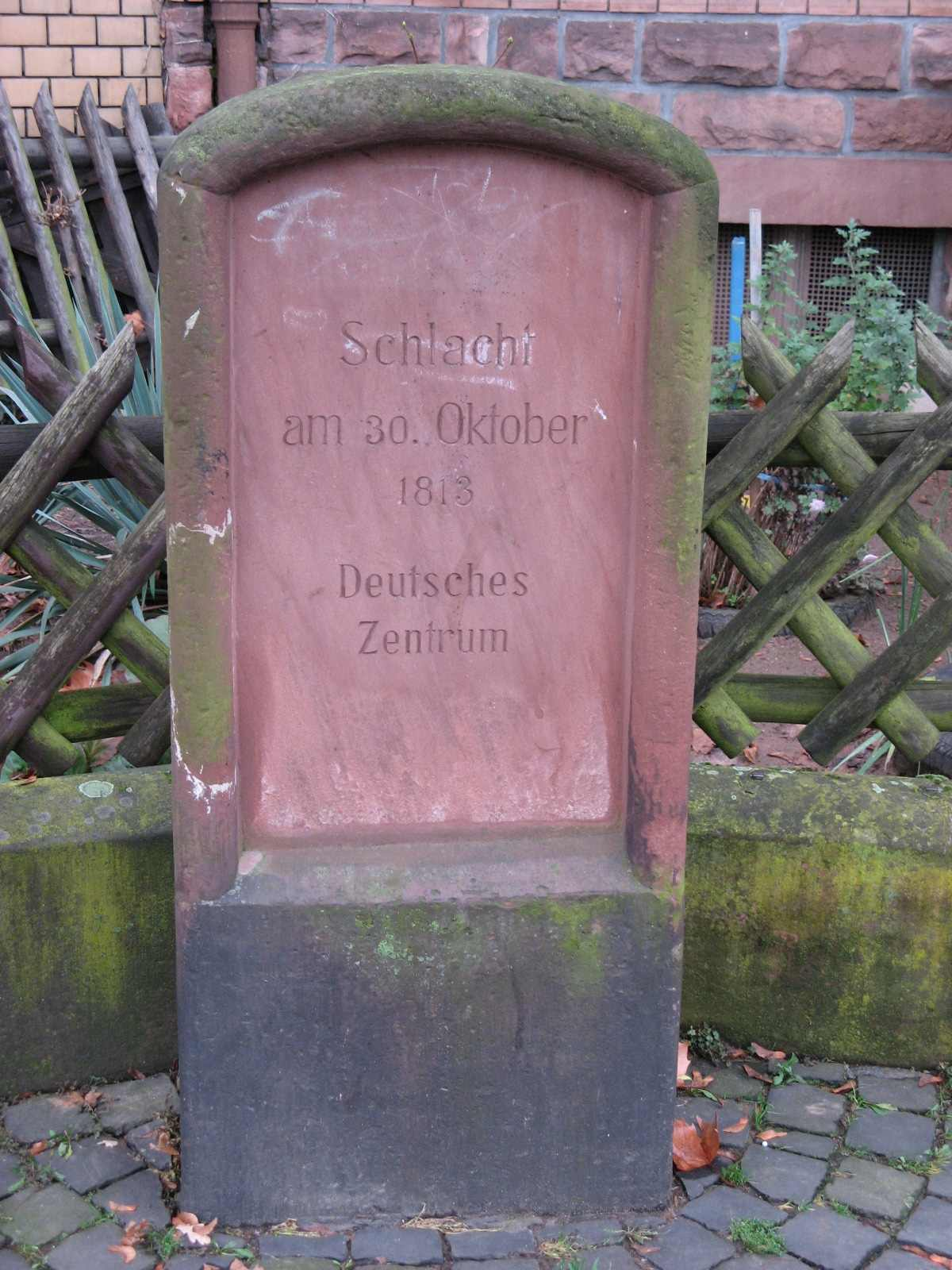
Memorial Stone indication the emplacement of the German troops during the Battle of Hanau

=== Coalition Army ===
The Austrian and Bavarian army at the battle of Hanau comprised two army corps, one Austrian and one Bavarian, and numbered no less than 42,000 men: 33,000 infantrymen, 9,000 cavalrymen and 94 artillery pieces. They were under the overall command of Bavarian General Karl Philipp von Wrede.

The Austrian Corps, under the command of Field-Marshal-Lieutenant Baron Fresnet, numbered 24,000 men: 18,000 infantrymen (18 battalions), 6,000 cavalrymen (32 squadrons) and 34 artillery pieces. These men were organised in three divisions: the 1st division under General Bach, the 2nd division under General Trautenberg, and the 3rd division under General Spleny (cavalry and reserve artillery). The Bavarian Corps, under Wrede's direct command, numbered 18,000 men: 15,000 infantrymen (17 battalions), 3,000 cavalrymen (20 squadrons), and 60 artillery pieces. These men were organised in two divisions, one cavalry reserve and one artillery reserve: the 2nd division was under General Beckers, the 3rd division under General Lamotte, the three-brigade cavalry reserve was under Generals Bieregg, Ellbracht, Dietz, and the artillery reserve was under General Cologne.

=== French Army ===
The French Grande Armée had suffered horrendous casualties at the battle of Leipzig, which left the French Corps at a fraction of its prior strength. Emperor Napoleon I was in personal command of the French forces in the battle. They numbered between 40,000 and 50,000 men, but only a fraction of them were ready for combat, with Napoleon able to count on little more than 30,000 men: the II, V and XI Army Corps, the I and II Cavalry Reserve Corps and the Imperial Guard. Guard units aside, many of the French battalions at Hanau were only 100-man strong, and the cavalry squadrons were much smaller.

Of these men, only one division (General Jean-Louis Dubreton's, 15 battalions) of Marshal Claude Victor-Perrin's II Corps, and another (General Henri-François-Marie Charpentier's 11 battalions) of Marshal MacDonald XI Corps, were committed to battle with a grand total of some 7,000-8,000 men. Cavalry support came from Sébastiani's II Cavalry Corps, some 3,000 sabres, and Nansouty's Imperial Guard cavalry, some 4,000 sabres. The entirety of the Imperial Guard infantry and artillery, some 6,000 men and 52 cannons, were also committed. Napoleon thus commanded a total of about 20,000 men (40 battalions, 113 squadrons) at the battle of Hanau.

== Preliminaries ==
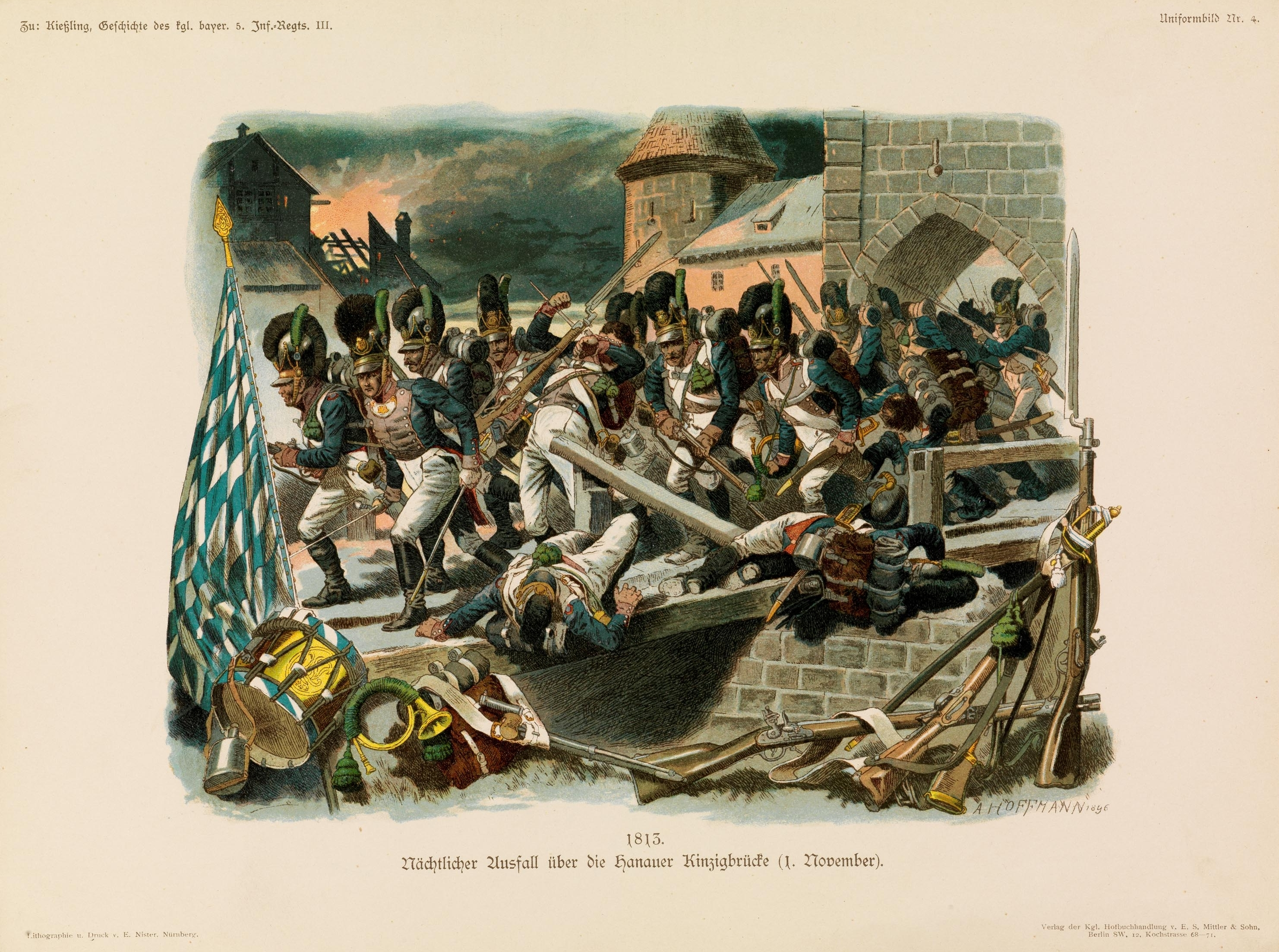
Bavarian infantry crossing the Kinzig bridge.

On 29 October, having correctly reckoned that his force was strong enough to block the retreat of a disorganised enemy army, Wrede decided to give battle. He had plenty of time to prepare his dispositions and deployed his army in a relatively narrow and deep order, which was quite sensible, given that his intention was to remain on the defensive. Wrede's left covered the road to Frankfurt and Mainz, the main retreat route that the French wanted to take. The bulk of his force was positioned along the Kinzig river, on the opposite bank from the city of Hanau, while on his right the divisions of Elbracht and Trautenberg were positioned on the southern bank of the Kinzig. Beckers's Bavarian division constituted the far right and was deployed on either side of the Kinzig. One regiment, the Austrian Szekler, two battalions strong, as well as a great many skirmishers detached from their parent units were placed in an advanced position in the Lamboy forest. Most of the cavalry was placed in the second line, in the centre, with the artillery quite evenly dispersed throughout the battlefield.

Meanwhile, Napoleon spent the night of 29/30 October at Isenburg castle, near Gelnhausen, and received detailed intelligence about the Austro-Bavarian preparations, which confirmed that the enemy was intending to make a stand. Napoleon thus directed the army's baggage and supply train northwards, away from the coalition forces, under the protection of Jean-Toussaint Arrighi de Casanova's Cavalry Corps, while leading his remaining forces in a frontal manoeuvre against Wrede's force. He ordered Victor to form the left wing with his Army Corps and march along the Kinzig, while MacDonald's Corps and the Guard were to penetrate the Lamboi forest. Part of the Guard cavalry under General Charles Lefebvre-Desnouettes was detached further north to cover the flank of the army. Napoleon studied Wrede's position and spotted its main weakness, namely that he had most of his army deployed with the river behind it, which would act as a natural barrier should retreat be necessary. Upon seeing Wrede's dispositions, Napoleon sarcastically noted: "I have made Wrede a Count but it was beyond my power to make him a General." However, in order to exploit this potentially fatal weakness in Wrede's deployment, Napoleon first had to beat him, and do so with an inferior number of infantry, less cavalry and fewer cannons, fighting against an enemy who had all the time it needed to deploy its forces for defense.

== Battle ==
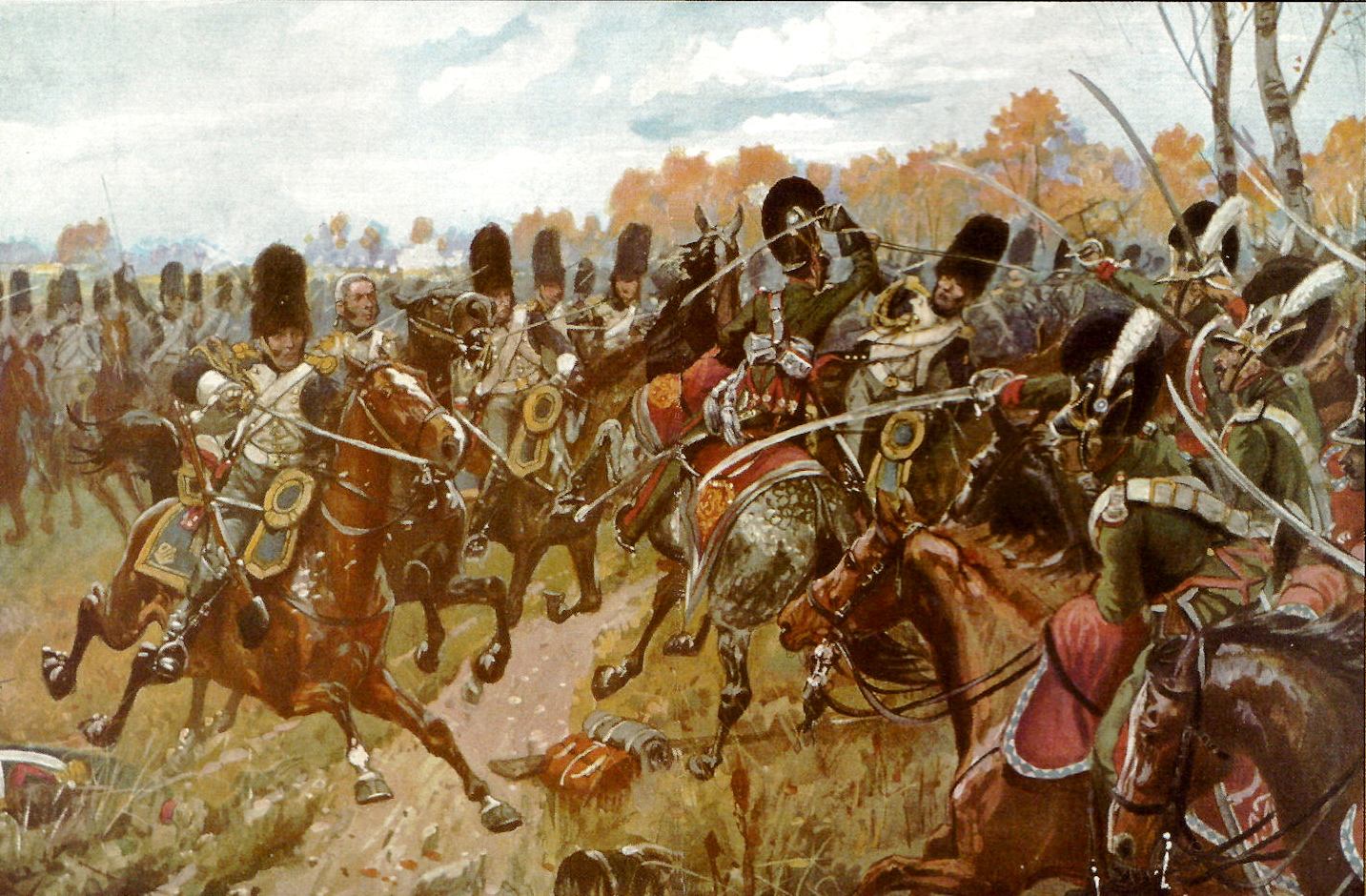
The Mounted Grenadiers of the Imperial Guard charging at Bavarian chevau-légers during the battle.

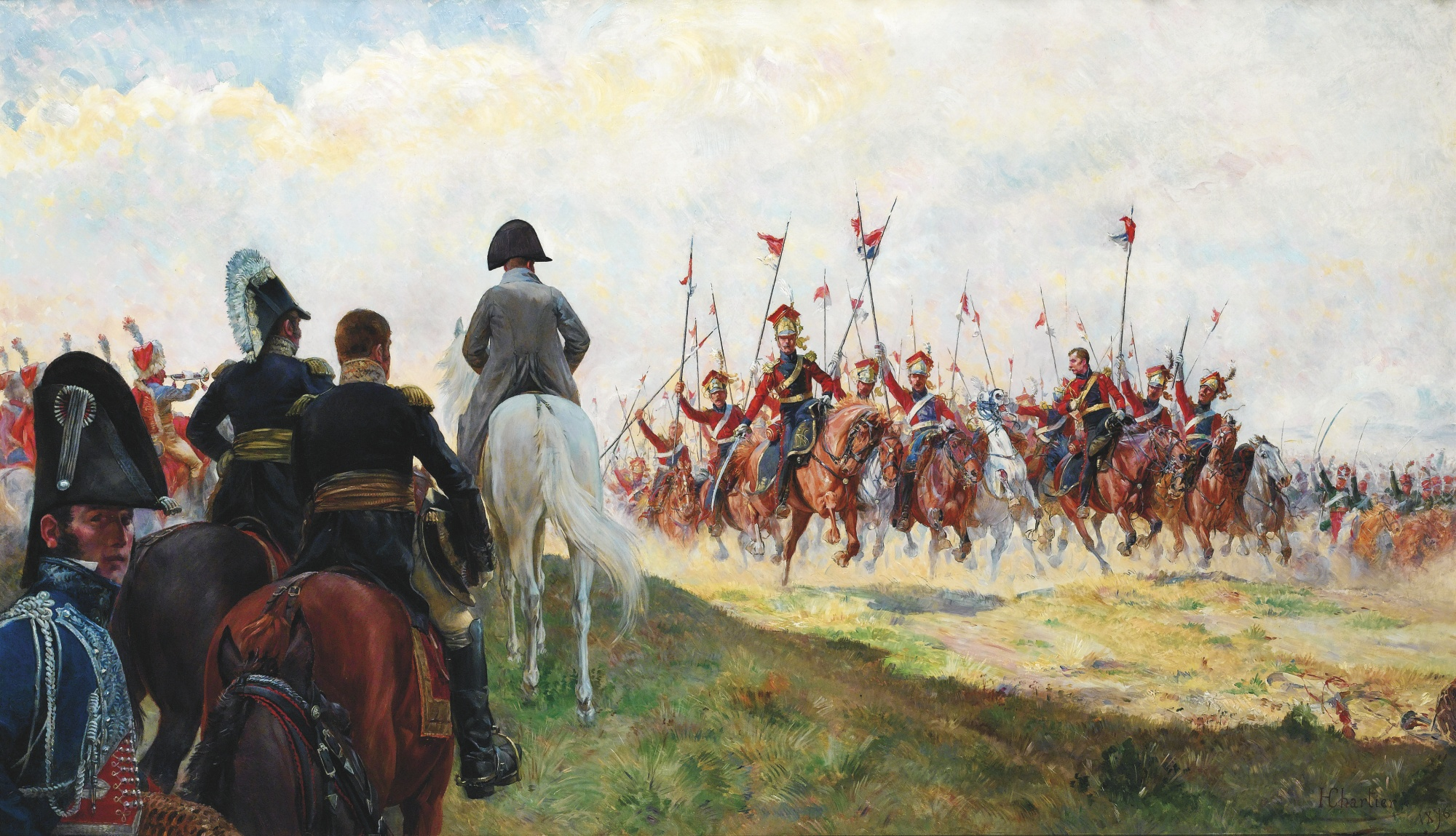
The 2nd Light Cavalry Lancers Regiment of the Imperial Guard after their charge at the battle.

Wrede, following successful skirmishing against the French, began to deploy his forces to face the main French force of 20,000. On 30 October Wrede placed his centre with the River Kinzig behind it, and his right wing to its south in an isolated position with only a single bridge linking it with the main force. Napoleon had only 17,000 troops including Marshal MacDonald's infantry and General Sébastiani's cavalry to face the enemy forces blocking them. Due to dense forests on the east of Wrede's positions the French were able to advance and make close contact with the allies almost unseen. Napoleon decided to attack the allies' left with all available troops. By midday Marshal Victor and MacDonald had cleared the forest in front of the allies' centre. Soon after, General Drouot found a track in the forest towards Wrede's left on which cannon could be moved. Three hours later Grenadiers of the Old Guard had cleared the area of allied troops and Drouot began to deploy 50 cannons supported by cavalry of the Guard and Sébastiani. A brief artillery bombardment from Drouot's cannons silenced Wrede's 28 cannons. French cavalry then attacked and pushed back Wrede's cavalry on his left flank, then attacked the flank of Wrede's centre. Wrede's centre started to fall back, skirting the banks of the Kinzig River and suffering heavy casualties. On the right wing, Wrede's forces tried to cross the single bridge over the Kinzig River to reinforce the centre, but many drowned in the attempt. Wrede was successful in rallying his troops to form a defensive line running from Lamboy Bridge to the town of Hanau. During the night the allies abandoned Hanau. The French occupied Hanau on 31 October with little resistance. Napoleon made no effort to pursue Wrede, the main road to Frankfurt was now reopened, the French retreat continued.

== Aftermath ==
Wrede suffered 9,000 casualties, Napoleon suffered fewer, but some 10,000 French stragglers became allied prisoners of war between 28 and 31 October. The French reached Frankfurt on 2 November 1813 and were only 20 miles from their relatively safe rear base at Mainz allowing Napoleon's army to recover and face the subsequent invasion of France in 1814.

Napoleon was not slowed, blocked or interfered with on his march to Frankfurt, where he arrived in the afternoon of 31 October 1813. Militarily the battle was a costly victory for Napoleon. Wrede failed to block Napoleon's path, although the allied forces of Russians, Prussians and Austrians had cut Napoleon's line of retreat. However Napoleon evaded the maneuver. The Kingdom of Bavaria wanted with this battle to support militarily its shift to the allied side. It did not really matter to the Bavarian politicians and military whether the battle was won or lost—as long as it took place. On 5 November 1813 Alexander I marched with his troops into Frankfurt.

Beethoven's Symphony No. 7, was premiered in Vienna on 8 December 1813, with Beethoven himself conducting at a charity concert for soldiers wounded in the Battle of Hanau.

== Honors ==
The best officers in the battle were honored by promotion and received many medals. For example, Carl Philipp von Wrede received two medals from the Austrian Empire: the Order of Leopold and the Commander's Cross of the Military Order of Maria Theresa and two from the Russian Empire: the Order of Alexander Nevsky and the Order of St. George.

To commemorate the Battle of Hanau, memorials were erected in the city of Hanau, five of which have been preserved: at Lamboystrasse, Karl-Marx-Strasse and Robert Blum Strasse, and two more at the Kinzig bridge. The battle is also engraved at the Arc de Triomphe in Paris in the list of battles won by Napoleon.

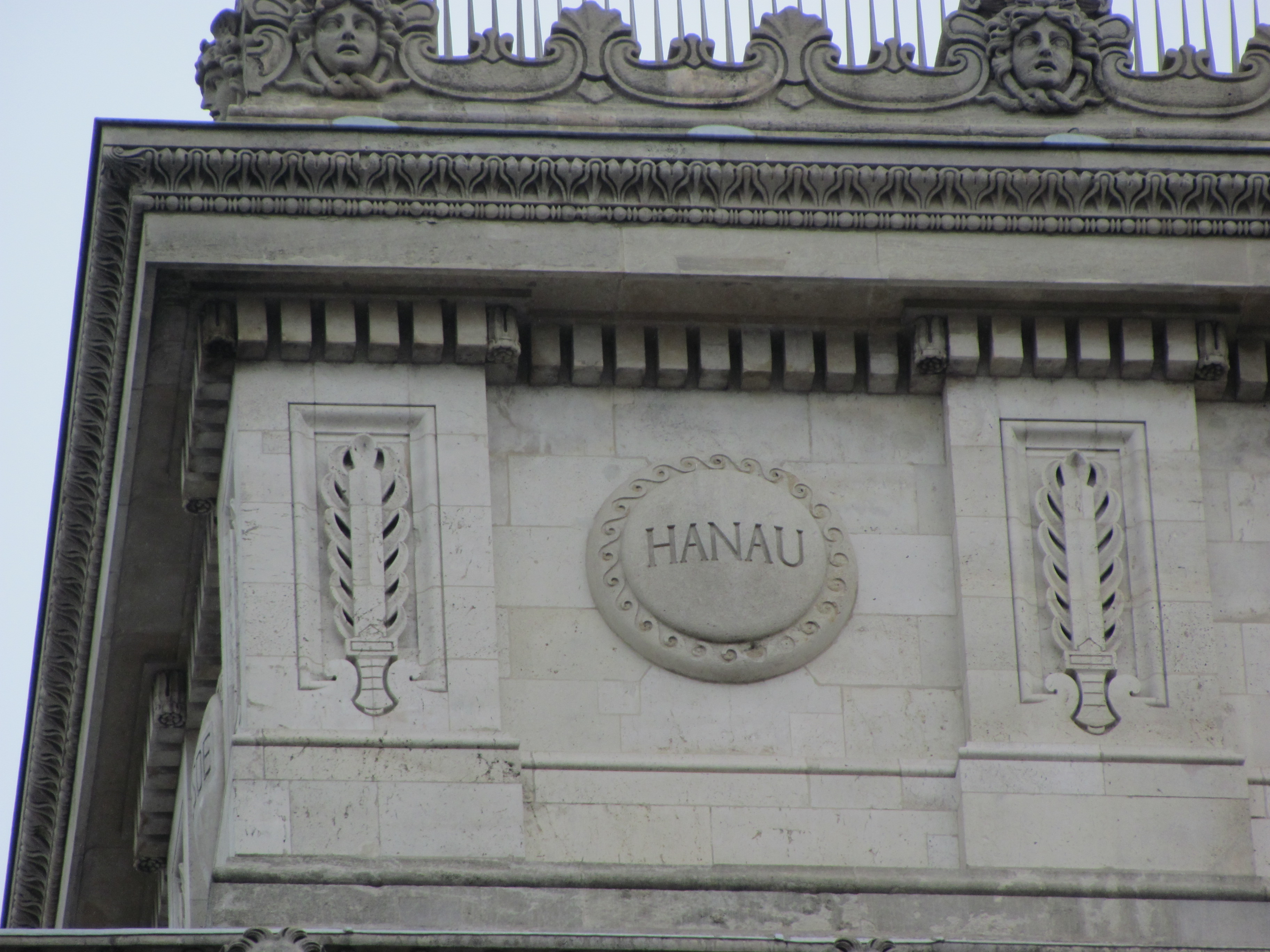
Inscription for the Battle of Hanau on the Arc de Triomphe

In 2015, around 200 remains of French soldiers fallen in the battle were exhumed near Frankfurt.

== Notes ==
Preceded by Battle of Leipzig	Napoleonic Wars; Battle of Hanau	Succeeded by Battle of Nivelle
