= Karl Philipp von Wrede =

Bavarian Field Marshal (1767–1838)

Generalfeldmarschall Fürst Karl Philipp von Wrede
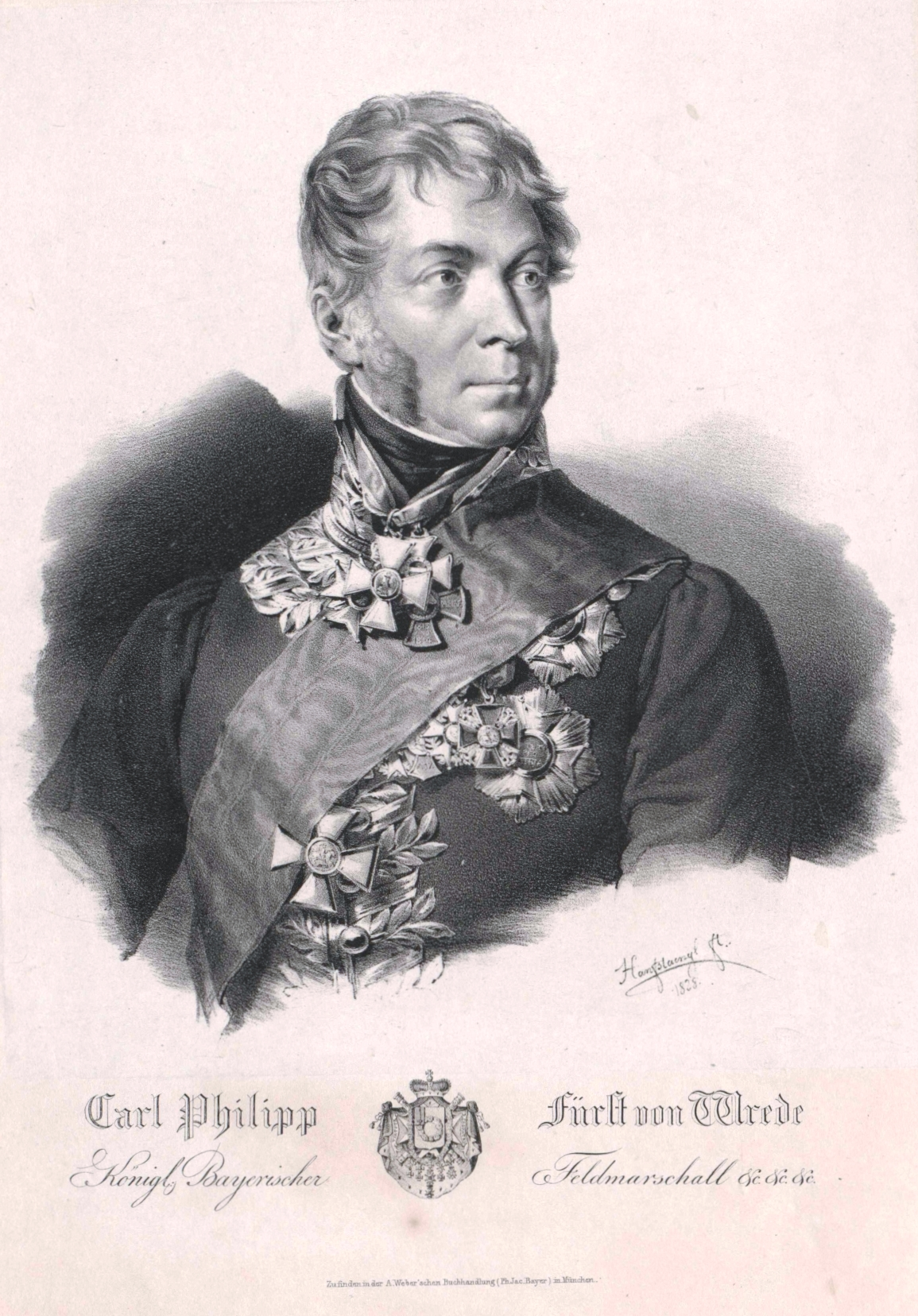
- Lithograph of Von Wrede by Franz Hanfstaengl
- Born: Karl Philipp Josef von Wrede; 29 April 1767; Heidelberg, Electorate of Bavaria
- Died: 12 December 1838 (aged 71); Ellingen, Kingdom of Bavaria
- Military career
- Allegiance: Electorate of Bavaria; Kingdom of Bavaria
- Branch: Bavarian Army
- Service years: 1793–1838
- Rank: Generalfeldmarschall
- Commands: 2nd Bavarian Division, Ausburg Regional Corps
- Conflicts: War of the Second Coalition; Battle of Hohenlinden; War of the Fifth Coalition; Battle of Abensberg; Battle of Landshut; Battle of Neumarkt-Sankt Veit; Tyrolean Rebellion; Battle of Wörgl; Battle of Wagram; French invasion of Russia; First Battle of Polotsk; Second Battle of Polotsk; War of the Sixth Coalition; Battle of Hanau; Battle of La Rothière; Battle of Lesmont; Battle of Bar-sur-Aube; Battle of Laubressel; Battle of Arcis-sur-Aube; Hundred Days; Invasion of France
- Awards: Military Order of Max Joseph; Military William Order; Order of St. George; Order of the Bath; Military Order of Maria Theresa

Karl (or Carl) Philipp Josef, Prince von Wrede (German: [ˈvʁeːdə]; 29 April 1767 – 12 December 1838) was a Bavarian field marshal. He was an ally of Napoleonic France until he negotiated the Treaty of Ried with Austria in 1813. Thereafter Bavaria joined the coalition.

== Early life ==
Von Wrede was born at Heidelberg, the youngest of three children of Ferdinand Josef Wrede (1722–1793), created in 1791 1st Baron von Wrede, and wife, married on 21 March 1746, Anna Katharina Jünger (1729–1804), by whom he had two more children: Baroness Luise von Wrede (23 September 1748 – 9 February 1794), married to Philipp, Baron von Horn (died 1834); and Baron Georg von Wrede (8 December 1765 – 3 April 1843), married on 17 January 1808 to Julie Zarka de Lukafalva (1781 – 1 August 1847), by whom he had issue.

== Early career ==
He was educated for the career of a civil official under the Electorate of the Palatinate government, but on the outbreak of the campaign of 1799 he raised a volunteer corps in the Palatinate and was made its colonel. This corps excited the mirth of the well-drilled Austrians with whom it served, but its colonel soon brought it into a good condition, and it distinguished itself during Kray's retreat on Ulm. At the Battle of Hohenlinden Wrede commanded one of the Palatinate infantry brigades with credit, and after the peace of Lunéville he was made lieutenant-general in the Bavarian Army, which was entering upon a period of reforms. Wrede soon made himself very popular, and distinguished himself in opposing the Austrian invasions of 1805.

Wrede was engaged in the campaign against Prussia, winning especial distinction in the Battle of Pułtusk. But the attitude of the French towards the Bavarian troops, and accusations of looting against himself, aroused the general's fiery temper, and both in 1807 and in 1809 outward harmony was only maintained by the tact of Maximilian, the king of Bavaria.

== 1809 ==
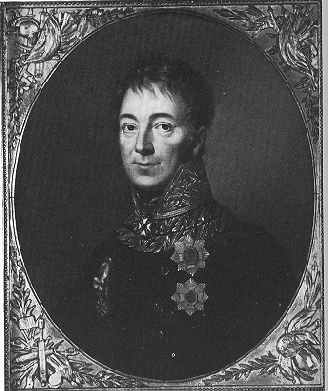
Karl Philipp von Wrede

In the War of the Fifth Coalition, he led the 2nd Bavarian Division in the VII Corps. He played an important part in the Battle of Abensberg on 20 April 1809. In the morning, he probed Joseph Radetzky's Austrian defense at Siegenburg. Unable to make headway, he marched his division north to Biburg and crossed the Abens River. From Biburg, he moved on Kirchdorf and attacked Frederick Bianchi's reinforced brigade. When the Austrians retreated, Wrede aggressively pursued them to Pfeffenhausen late that evening. He led the advance from Pfeffenhausen and was involved in the Battle of Landshut on 21 April, capturing 11 cannon. On 24 April, his division was defeated at the Battle of Neumarkt-Sankt Veit when Johann von Hiller counterattacked in superior force. After occupying Salzburg on 29 April, Wrede moved southwest against the Tyrolean Rebellion. He pushed back Tyrolean irregulars at Lofer on 11 May and defeated Franz Fenner's mixed regulars and Tyroleans at Waidring the next day. On 13 May, he played a major part in crushing the division of Johann Gabriel Chasteler de Courcelles in the Battle of Wörgl.

After the French defeat at the Battle of Aspern-Essling, Napoleon I of France called Wrede's division to Vienna as a reinforcement. At first, Wrede's division stood in reserve in the Battle of Wagram. In the afternoon of 6 July, the Bavarians were sent into battle in support of Jacques MacDonald's celebrated attack. In a successful charge on the village of Sussenbrunn, Wrede was grazed by a bullet. Fearing the wound was fatal, he told MacDonald, "Tell the Emperor I die for him. I recommend to him my wife and children." Seeing that Wrede's injury was minor, the French general smiled and replied, "I think that you will be able to make this recommendation to him yourself." The embarrassed general got up and continued to lead his troops.

== Later career ==
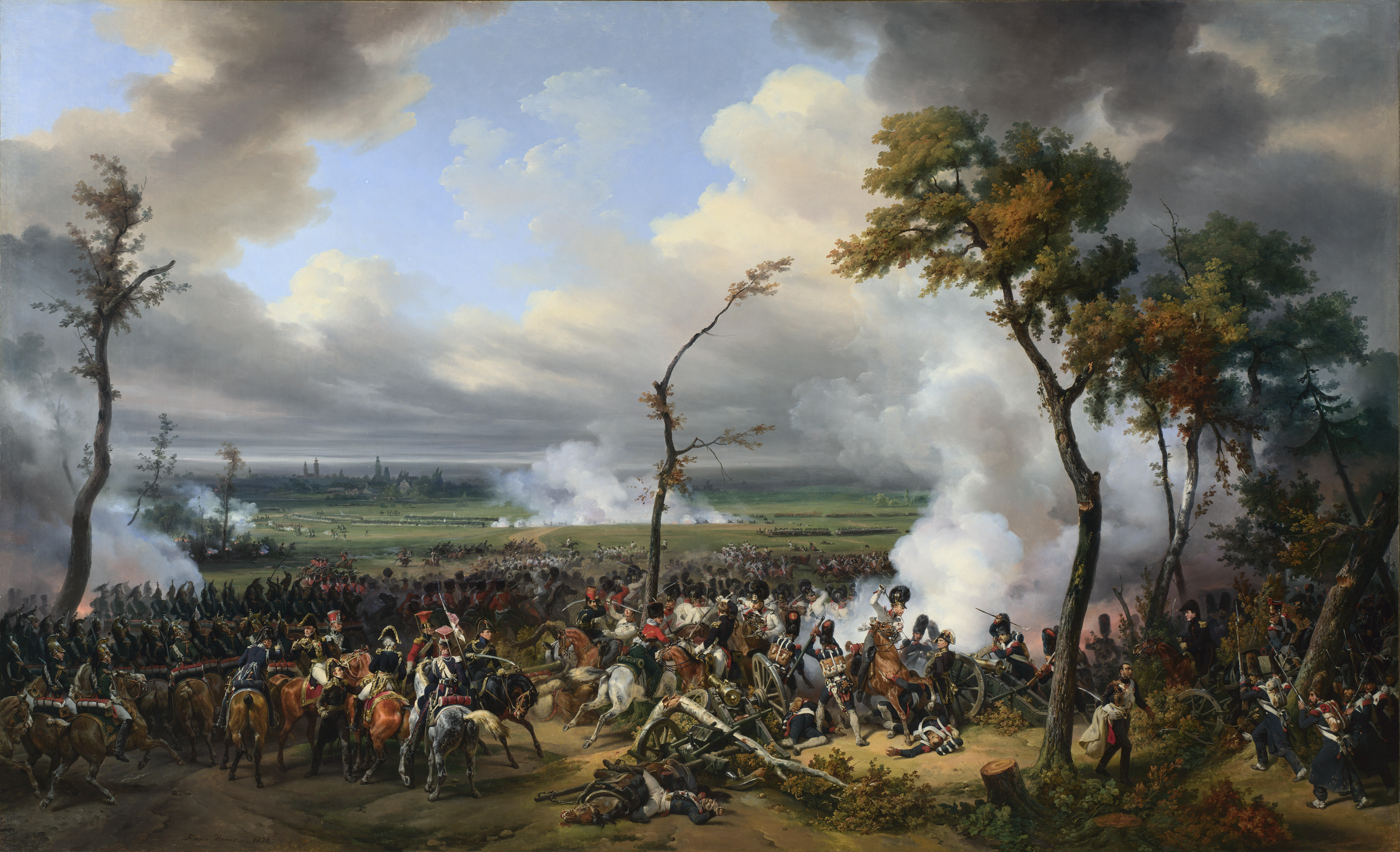
The Battle of Hanau by Horace Vernet. Napoleon defeated Wrede's attempt to block his retreat into France at the battle in late October 1813

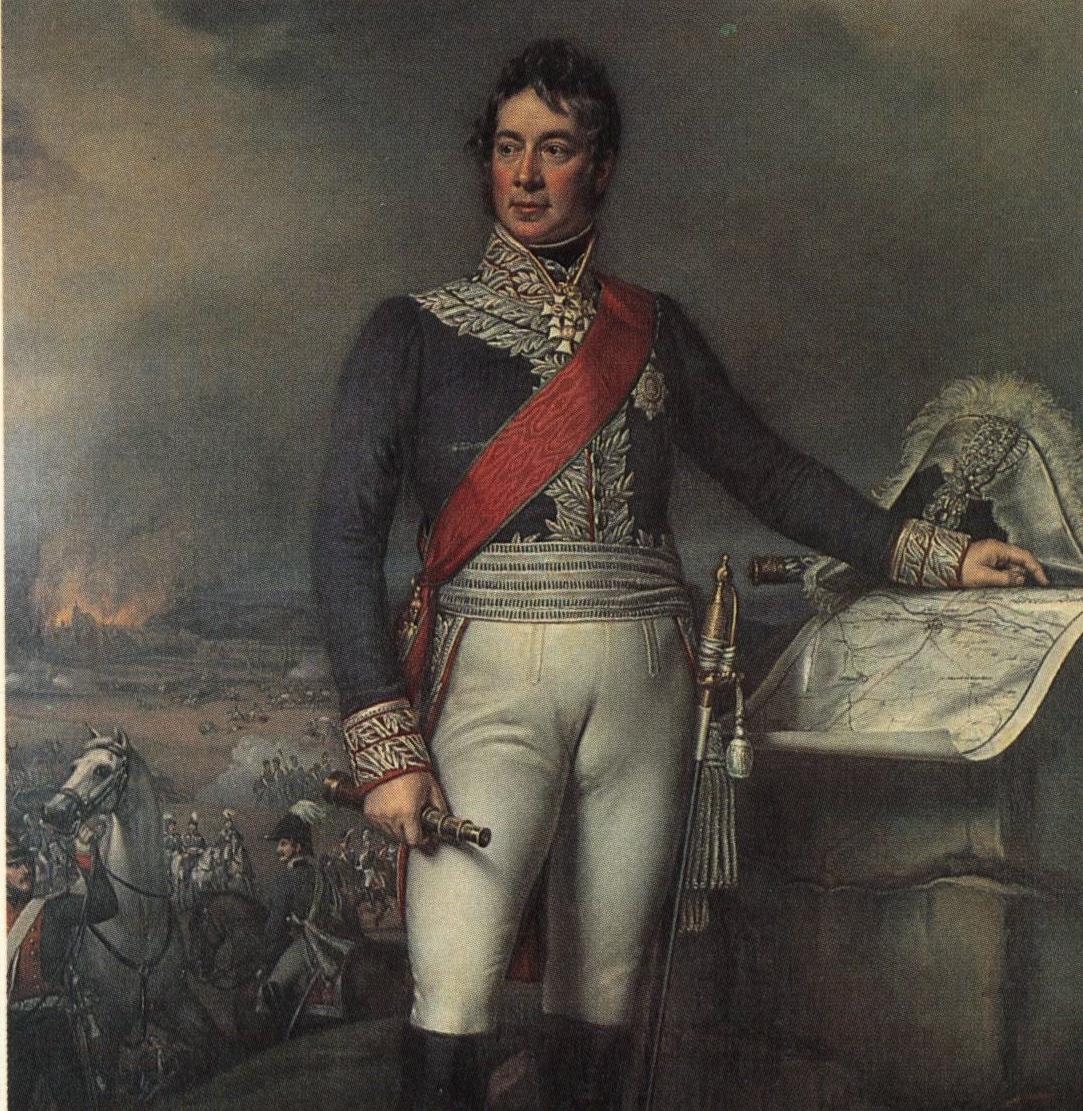
Field Marshal Carl Philipp Fürst von Wrede, 1815

The Bavarians were for several years the active allies of Napoleon, and Wrede led the Bavarian corps that fought in Russia in 1812. Just before the Battle of Leipzig in October 1813, he negotiated the Treaty of Ried between Austria and Bavaria, by which Bavaria switched sides. Wrede then fought with the allies against Napoleon. After Leipzig, he tried to block the French escape at the Battle of Hanau on 30 and 31 October. Upon seeing the Bavarian armies' opening dispositions at the battle, Napoleon is said to have said of Wrede, "I made him a count, but I couldn't make him a general." Wrede positioned his troops poorly and Napoleon smashed one of his wings, inflicting 9,000 casualties. In 1814, at La Rothière, under the command of Blücher, he led the attack on Bonaparte's extreme left flank. In the same year he was created prince and field marshal. Wrede represented Bavaria at the Congress of Vienna.

He died in Ellingen. Von Wrede was no doubt the leading Bavarian soldier of his day.

== Family ==
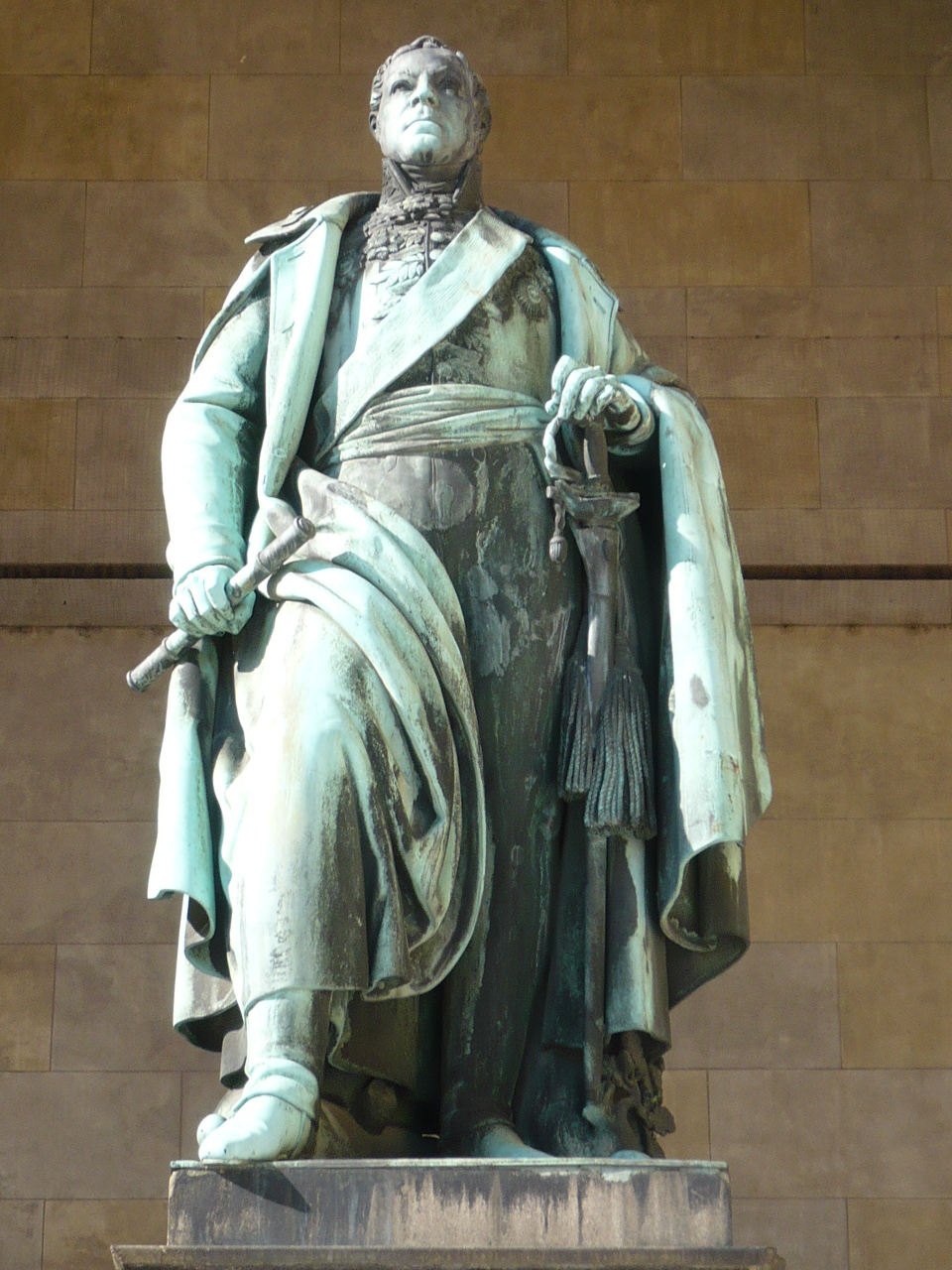
Statue of Wrede at the Feldherrnhalle (lit. 'Field Marshals' Hall') in Munich

Coat of Arms of the Princes of Wrede

He married on 18 March 1795 Countess Sofie von Wiser-Siegelsbach (23 May 1771 – 7 May 1837), by whom he had eight children:

- Princess Amalie Auguste von Wrede (15 January 1796 – 11 September 1871, buried in Oettingen), married in Hochaltingen on 31 August 1813 Johann Aloys III, Prince zu Oettingen-Oettingen and zu Oettingen-Spielberg (Oettingen, 9 May 1788 – Munich, 7 May 1855, buried in Oettingen), and had issue
- Carl Theodor, 2nd Prince von Wrede (8 January 1797 – 10 December 1871), married firstly on 26 December 1824 Countess Amalie von Thürheim (20 July 1801 – 30 October 1842), and had issue, and married secondly on 13 January 1844 Amalie Löw (24 February 1811 – 24 June 1879):
  - Princess Walburga Marie von Wrede (7 March 1826 – 30 December 1883), married on 6 November 1851 Sigismund, Count zu Boineburg (died 1882)
  - Carl Friedrich, 3rd Prince von Wrede (Munich, 7 February 1828 – Ellingen, 22 December 1897), married in Tutzing on 28 July 1856 Countess Helene von Vieregg (Tutzing, 30 March 1838 – Pähl, 21 October 1913), and had issue:
    - Princess Juliane Karoline Anna Maria von Wrede (3 June 1857 – 29 January 1943), married on 14 July 1880 Otto, Baron von Hallberg zu Broich (died 1905)
    - Princess Leopoldine Gabriele Anna von Wrede (3 May 1860 – 22 June 1937), unmarried and without issue
    - Carl Philipp, 4th Prince von Wrede (Ellingen, 10 September 1862 – Munich, 16 August 1928), married in Prague on 19 November 1889 Princess Maria Anna von Lobkowicz (Prague, 24 December 1867 – Pähl, 6 May 1957), and had issue:
      - Princess Maria Helene Leonhardine Alexia Ludovica von Wrede (Ellingen, 14 September 1890 – Pähl, 28 June 1974), unmarried and without issue
      - Princess Maria Sidonia (Zdenka) Leopoldine Leonhardine Melchiora von Wrede (Munich, 15 November 1892 – Munich, 21 July 1983), married at Castle Sandsee on 5 July 1921 Hans, Ritter und Edler Herr von Rauscher auf Weeg (Munich, 7 August 1889 – Munich, 28 November 1957)
      - Princess Marie Gabrielle Leopoldine Leonhardine Paula Balthasara von Wrede (Ellingen, 25/26 June 1895 – Munich, 14 September/November 1971), married in Munich civilly on 20 and religiously on 21 March 1922 Prince Robert-Prosper von Arenberg (Pesch-am-Rhein, 10 August 1895 – Munich, 24 February 1972), and had female issue
      - Princess Maria Rosa Simone Bernhardine Kaspara Gregoria von Wrede (Ellingen, 14 November 1896 – Munich, 29 February 1920), married in Munich on 28 June 1919 Hans Ritter and Edler Herr von Rauscher auf Weeg (Munich, 7 August 1889 – Munich, 28 November 1957)
      - Carl Joseph Maria Antonius Oskar Philipp Leonhard Melchior, 5th Prince von Wrede (Ellingen, 12 June 1899 – Märtensmühle, 3 May 1945, of wounds received in action in the Second World War on 30 April 1945), married as her first husband in Bad Warmbrunn on 17 July 1939 Countess Sophie Hedwig Maria Anna Schaffgotsch genannt Semperfrei von und zu Kynast und Greiffenstein (Bad Warmbrunn, 25 May 1916 – Weissenburg, 6 September 2008), and had issue:
        - Princess Anna Gabriella/Gabriele Maria Theresia Kaspara von Wrede (Pähl, 11 September 1940), married as his second wife in Ellingen on 15 October 1971 Archduke Rudolf of Austria, (Prangins, near Nyon, 5 September 1919 – Brussels, 15 May 2010, buried in Klein Muri), and had female issue
        - Carl Friedrich Oskar Melchior, 6th Prince von Wrede (Pähl, 7 June 1942), married firstly in Munich on 26 July 1969 (divorced in 1989) Ingeborg Hamberger (Bad Feilenbach, 2 December 1944), and has issue, and married secondly in Pleinfeld on 9 September 1991 Eva Katharina Kovarcz de Kovarczfalva (Obervellach, 10 November 1945), without issue:
          - Princess Alexandra Elisabeth Sophie Maria Caspara von Wrede (Munich, 12 May 1970), married civilly in Frières on 27 March 1998 and religiously in Ellingen on 2 May 1998 Archduke Karl of Austria, (Katana, 5 November 1955), and has issue
          - Prince Carl Christian Franz Ferdinand Melchior von Wrede (Munich, 6 November 1972), married civilly in Castle Ellingen on 14 June 2003 and religiously in Budapest on 12 July 2003 Countess Katalin Bethlen de Bethlen (Vienna, 20 September 1975), and has issue:
            - Princess Alicia Claire Eugenie Sophie von Wrede (Vienna, 7 December 2007)
            - Prince Carl Nikolaus Franz Valentin Melchor von Wrede (Vienna, 29 January 2010)
            - Prince Balint Alexis Philipp Gilbert Balthasar von Wrede (Vienna, 24 April 2012)
          - Princess Sophie-Elisabeth Maria Balthasara von Wrede (Pähl, 16 January 1944), married in Ellingen on 17 August 1968 Tassilo de Garnerin de la Thuille, Count von Montgelas (Pähl, 2 April 1937)
      - Princess Maria Ida Leonhardine Hedwig Mechtildis Balthasara von Wrede (Munich, 26 February 1909 – Anholt, 25 October 1998), married as his first wife in Munich on 19 July 1928 (divorced in 1948) Nikolaus Leopold 8th Prince zu Salm-Salm (Potsdam, 14 February 1906 – Anholt, 15 January 1988), and had issue
    - Prince Oskar Eugen Friedrich Maria von Wrede (Munich, 20 May 1867 – Ellingen, 16 June 1953), unmarried and without issue
  - Prince Otto Friedrich von Wrede (25 April 1829 – 14 February 1896), married on 24 September 1858 Ignatia von Mack (23 April 1837 – 12 November 1905), and had issue:
    - Princess Helene Ignatia Amalie von Wrede (Vienna, 18 September 1859 – Wallgau, 21 September 1935), married in Mondsee on 2 July 1879 Karl, Count von Almeida (Lisbon, 10 May 1846 – Munich, 21 Jul 1902)
  - Princess Emma Sofie von Wrede (17 June 1831 – 7 January 1888), married on 5 June 1853 Wilhelm, Count von Tattenbach (died 1898)
  - Prince Oskar Eugen von Wrede (23 September 1834 – 2 September 1907), married on 16 October 1873 Baroness Maria von Leitner (5 June 1848 – 17 July 1902), and had issue:
    - Prince Albin Oskar von Wrede (26 September 1874 – 1877/8)
    - Prince Karl Friedrich Maximilian von Wrede (12 October 1875 – 1877/8)
  - Prince Alfred Josef von Wrede (11 January 1836 – 9 January 1839)
  - Prince Alfred Karl Johann Friedrich Georg von Wrede (2 July 1844 – 1 October 1911), married firstly on 19 September 1866 (divorced in 1883) Rosa von Mack (25 February 1831 – 7 January 1915), and had issue, and married secondly on 23 July 1884 Karola Köpatha de Nemes Kapus (11 July 1844 – 28 January 1926), without issue:
    - Princess Olga Alfreda Rosa von Wrede (25 July 1867 – 9 August 1938), married on 8 September 1885 Prince Alfred Lodzia Ponin-Poninski (died 1915)
    - Prince Adalbert Alfred Friedrich Otto von Wrede (1868–1883)
    - Prince Ignaz Christian Egon Friedrich von Wrede (9 February 1870 – 5 September 1945)
- Prince Josef von Wrede (27 September 1800 – 26 December 1871), married on 31 October 1836 Anastasia Petrowo-Solovovo (17 April 1808 – 25 December 1870), and had issue:
  - Prince Nikolaus von Wrede (Saint Petersburg, 26 December 1837 – Gmunden, 1 August 1909), married in Vienna on 15 June 1879 Countess Gabriele zu Herberstein (Graz, 3 December 1851 – Gmunden, 9 November 1923), and had issue:
    - Princess Gabrielle Therese Maria Pia Anastasia Olga von Wrede (Graz, 5 May 1880 – Lugano-Massagno, 18 May 1966), married in Vienna on 27 April 1907 Eduard, Count von Kielmansegg (Vienna, 17 February 1874 – Walshausen, 10 February 1941)
    - Princess Maria Theresia Josefa von Wrede (Athens, 29 October 1881 – Gmunden, 7 February 1966), unmarried and without issue
    - Princess Therese Maria Josefa Antonia Anna Ignatia Lydia von Wrede (Munich, 29 March 1893 – Gmunden, 6 February 1973), married in Gmunden on 21 October 1919 Ernst August, Baron von der Wense (Vienna, 28 May 1891 – Gmunden, 16 December 1942)
  - Princess Olga von Wrede (born 14 January 1839), married on 1 May 1862 Karl, Baron von Simbschen (died 1865)
  - Princess Anastasia von Wrede (Cerlenkow, 12 August 1840 – Wiener Neustadt, 28 December 1912), married in Graz on 30 May 1870 Friedrich Albrecht, Count zu Ortenburg (Mühlhausen, 3 October 1831 – Coburg, 28 August 1904), and had issue
  - Prince Konstantin von Wrede (15 January 1842 – 30 December 1873), unmarried and without issue
  - Prince Adolf von Wrede (23 July 1849 – September 1923), married firstly on 30 June 1892 (divorced in 1896) Ludmilla Maldaner (born 4 September 1861), without issue, and married secondly on 22 October 1896 María del Carmen de Alvear y Pacheco (16 September 1855 – 2 June 1926), without issue
- Prince Gustav Friedrich von Wrede (23 February 1802 – 13 April 1840), married on 19 May 1833 Contessa Maria Balsamo (27 September 1802 – 23 July 1841), and had issue:
  - Prince Johanna Adelaide von Wrede (28 July 1834 – 23 May 1915), married on 3 October 1860 Karl, Count von Wiser
  - Princess Sofie von Wrede (26 September 1836 – 13 May 1849)
- Prince Eugen Franz von Wrede (4 March 1806 – 1 May 1845), married on 4 April 1835 Baroness Mathilde Therese von Schaumburg (13 September 1811 – 15 December 1887), and had issue:
  - Prince Edmund Karl von Wrede (14 January 1836 – 2 November 1890), unmarried and without issue
  - Princess Bertha Amalie von Wrede (30 August 1837 – 19 September 1883), unmarried and without issue
  - Prince Eugen Adolf von Wrede (Munich, 6 January 1839 – Munich, 18 October 1909), married in Schloss Weixelstein on 29 September 1875 Maria von Gutmansthal-Benvenuti (Odessa, 3 December 1852 – Munich, 30 May 1936), and had issue:
    - Prince Karl Ludwig Edmund Maria von Wrede (Pola, 15 September 1876 – Munich, 31 January 1947), married in Munich on 24 June 1930 Marie Alice Mayer (Lommeringen, 1 May 1886 – 19__), without issue
    - Prince Edmund Alexander Nikolaus Maria von Wrede (Weixelstein, 21 August 1878 – Munich, 14 March 1963), married in Madrid on 20 May 1903 Edda de Benítez y Alvear (Buenos Aires, 3 November 1880 – Munich, 21 November 1958), and had issue:
      - Princess Carmen Adolfine Nicolette Elvira Dolores Elli Charlotte Maria von Wrede (Berlin, 28 March 1904 – Munich, 25 March 1994, buried in Bamberg), married civilly in Bayreuth on 7 September 1946 and religiously in Schloss Niederstotzingen on 24 September 1946 Prince Alexander Ernst August Ignaz Joseph zu Solms-Braunfels (Braunfels, 5 August 1903 – Munich, 8 October 1989, buried in Bamberg), without issue
      - Princess Edda Maria Lydia Angeles Eugenia Adamsina Therese Edmunda von Wrede (Berlin, 28 March 1904 – Munich, 28 July 1985), married in Bayreuth on 2 April 1946 (divorced in 1961) Walter Burckhard (Strassburg, 19 February 1908 – 19__)
      - Prince Edmund Philipp Josef Adam Karl Eugen Antonius Eustachius Maria von Wrede (20 September 1919 – k.a. in the Second World War, 22 June 1941), unmarried and without issue
- Princess Sofie Marie von Wrede (4 March 1806 – 21 June 1866), unmarried and without issue
- Princess Natalie Wilhelmine von Wrede (born 4 March 1809), unmarried and without issue
- Prince Adolf Wilhelm von Wrede (8 October 1810 – 27 July 1884), married on 24 April 1836 Desirée Grabowska (1 June 1799 – 16 November 1863), and had issue:
  - Prince Raoul Josef von Wrede (25 November 1843 – 19 October 1914), married Countess Marie Czapska (died 10 December 1873), without issue

== Honours ==
He received the following orders and decorations:

- Kingdom of Bavaria:
  - Grand Cross of the Military Order of Max Joseph, 1 March 1806; Chancellor, 1822
  - Grand Cross of Merit of the Bavarian Crown, 25 June 1813
  - Knight of St. Hubert, 1813
  - Cross of Honour of the Order of Ludwig, 1827
- French Empire: Grand Officer of the Legion of Honour, 13 March 1806
- Austrian Empire:
  - Commander of the Military Order of Maria Theresa, 9 November 1813
  - Grand Cross of the Imperial Order of Leopold, 9 November 1813
  - Grand Cross of the Royal Hungarian Order of St. Stephen, 1833
- Grand Duchy of Hesse: Grand Cross of the Ludwig Order
- Netherlands: Grand Cross of the Military William Order, 27 August 1815
- Kingdom of Prussia:
  - Knight of the Black Eagle, 3 February 1814
  - Knight of the Red Eagle, 1st Class
- Russian Empire:
  - Knight of St. George, 3rd Class, 9 November 1813; 2nd Class, 19 May 1814
  - Knight of St. Alexander Nevsky, 9 November 1813
  - Knight of St. Andrew, 17 May 1814; in Diamonds, 1826
- United Kingdom: Honorary Grand Cross of the Bath (military), 18 August 1815
