= The Battle of Hanau =

Painting by Horace Vernet

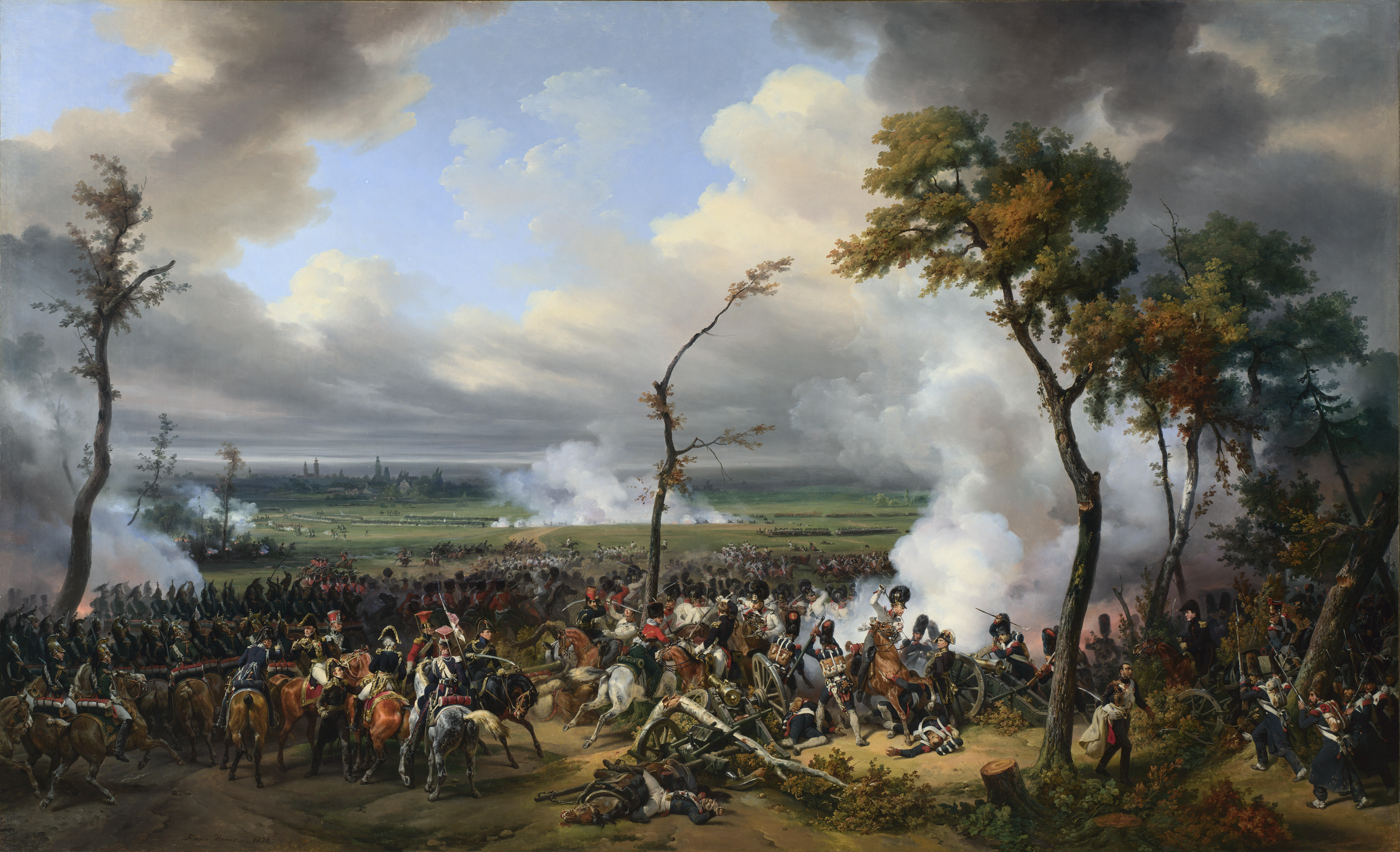
- Artist: Horace Vernet
- Year: 1824
- Medium: Oil on canvas
- Dimensions: 174 cm × 289.8 cm (69 in × 114.1 in)
- Location: National Gallery, London

The Battle of Hanau is an 1824 history painting by the French artist Horace Vernet. It depicts the Battle of Hanau fought at Hanau in Hesse in October 1813 during the Napoleonic Wars.

== Subject ==
Following the heavy defeat for Napoleon at the Battle of Leipzig earlier in the month, Bavarian forces (having recently changed sides) attempted to block Napoleon's retreat towards the Rhine. An Austro-Bavarian force under Marshal Wrede were defeated by the retreating elements of the Grande Armée. This allowed Napoleon to reach France with some forces intact and take the field for a further years campaign in 1814.

== Painting ==
It was one of a number of paintings Vernet exhibited at the Salon of 1824, having boycotted the previous Salon in 1822 when two of his works were rejected. It was the third in a series of four epic battles scenes painted by Vernet between 1821 and 1826, each depicting major events from the French Revolutionary and Napoleonic Wars. The four works were commissioned for 38,000 francs by the Duke of Orleans, the future Louis Philippe I. It was acquired from Louis Phillippe by the Marquess of Hertford following the Revolution of 1848 during which it had been damaged when mobs attacked the Palais-Royal. Hertford brought in Vernet to oversee the repairs of the work. Today it is in the National Gallery in London.

== Bibliography ==
- Harkett, Daniel & Hornstein, Katie (ed.) Horace Vernet and the Thresholds of Nineteenth-Century Visual Culture. Dartmouth College Press, 2017.
- Hornstein, Katie. Picturing War in France, 1792–1856. Yale University Press, 2018.
- Junkelmann, Marcus. Napoleon und Bayern: Eine Königskrone und ihr Preis. Verlag Friedrich Pustet, 2014.
- Thoma, Julia. The Final Spectacle: Military Painting under the Second Empire, 1855–1867. Walter de Gruyter, 2019.
