= Treaty of Ried =

1813 treaty between Bavaria and Austria

The Treaty of Ried of 8 October 1813 was a treaty that was signed between the Kingdom of Bavaria and Austrian Empire. By the treaty, Bavaria left the Confederation of the Rhine, which was allied with Napoleon, and agreed to join the Sixth Coalition against Napoleon in exchange for a guarantee of its continued sovereign and independent status. On 14 October, Bavaria made a formal declaration of war against the First French Empire. The treaty was passionately backed by the Crown Prince Louis and by Marshal von Wrede.

The treaty was drafted by Klemens von Metternich, who assembled the German partners in the Sixth Coalition. By separating Bavaria from the Confederation of the Rhine, Metternich checked the ambitions of German nationalists such as Baron von Stein, who had been aiming to use the fall of Napoleon to create a pan-German state. Metternich, a conservative Austrian, desired to avoid a pan-German state, which would dissolve local sovereignty and engender liberalism, and also desired to avoid the Prussian ambition of bifurcating Germany between Prussia and Austria. The secret articles in the treaty guaranteed full sovereignty to Bavaria under its existing borders.

The enactment of the treaty broke Napoleon's supply lines, and two weeks later, he was defeated at the Battle of Leipzig.
