= Claude Marie Meunier =

French division commander

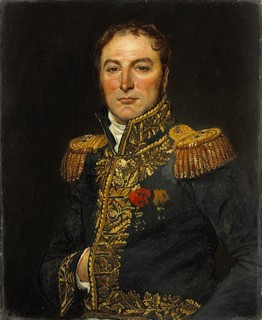
- Claude Marie Meunier by Jacques-Louis David
- Born: 4 August 1770; Saint-Amour, Jura, France
- Died: 14 April 1846 (aged 75) Paris, France
- Allegiance: France
- Branch: Infantry
- Service years: (France) 1792–1815, 1831–1833
- Rank: General of Division
- Conflicts: War of the First Coalition; First Battle of Wissembourg; Campaign in Italy; Campaign in Egypt; War of the Third Coalition; Battle of Haslach-Jungingen; Battle of Dürenstein; War of the Fourth Coalition; Battle of Halle; Battle of Waren-Nossentin; Battle of Lübeck; Battle of Mohrungen; Battle of Friedland; Peninsular War; Battle of Uclés; Battle of Medellín; Battle of Talavera; Battle of Barrosa; French invasion of Russia; War of the Sixth Coalition; Battle of Lützen; Battle of Bautzen; Battle of Katzbach; Battle of Leipzig; Battle of Brienne; Battle of La Rothière; Battle of Champaubert; Battle of Montmirail; Battle of Château-Thierry; Battle of Vauchamps; Battle of Craonne; Battle of Laon; Battle of Reims
- Awards: Légion d'Honneur, GC 1835
- Other work: Baron of the Empire, 1808

Claude Marie Meunier (French pronunciation: [klod maʁi mønje]; 4 August 1770 – 14 April 1846) became a French division commander during the Napoleonic Wars. He joined a volunteer regiment in 1792 and fought on the Rhine and in Italy as a captain. After a stint in the Consular Guard as a major, he became colonel of the 9th Light Infantry Regiment in 1803. His regiment fought at Haslach and Dürenstein in 1805, Halle, Waren and Lübeck in 1806, and Mohrungen and Friedland in 1807. Transferred to Spain, he led his troops at Uclés, Medellín and Talavera in 1809. He was promoted general of brigade in 1810 and fought at Barrosa in 1811.

He participated in the French invasion of Russia in 1812. He led a brigade at Lützen, Bautzen, the Katzbach and Leipzig in 1813. He was appointed general of division at the end of 1813 and led a Young Guard division at Brienne, La Rothière, Champaubert, Montmirail, Château-Thierry, Vauchamps, Craonne, Laon and Reims in 1814. He married a daughter of painter Jacques-Louis David. His surname is one of the names inscribed under the Arc de Triomphe, on Column 30.

== Early career ==
Meunier was born on 4 August 1770 to a family of modest means in Saint-Amour in what later became the Jura department. He enlisted in the 10th Jura Volunteer Battalion on 5 August 1792 and became a captain seven days later. He fought with the Army of the Rhine from 1792 to 1794. He was wounded in the left thigh by a bullet on 13 October 1793 at the First Battle of Wissembourg. He transferred to the Army of Italy where he served from 1794 to 1797. On 14 May 1797 Meunier was a grenadier captain in the 1st Battalion of the 69th Demi-Brigade. He transferred to the Army of the Orient and fought in the French campaign in Egypt and Syria in 1798–1801. He became captain in the Foot Guides on 20 January 1799 and was promoted to chef de bataillon (major) on 17 February 1800.

During the occupation of Egypt, the French generals formed two quarreling factions, those supporting the army commander Jacques-François Menou and those backing Jean Reynier. Fearing that the opposing faction was about to depose him, Menou sent Jacques Zacharie Destaing with more than 350 soldiers and a cannon to surround Reynier's house on 13 April 1801. An officer named Novel burst into the room where Reynier, François Étienne Damas and others were meeting and demanded that they surrender their weapons. When they refused, Novel brought in some Foot Guides and shouted "Bourrez-moi ces bougres" (Fuck me these buggers)! The officers in the room drew their swords. Reynier aimed a pistol at Novel and promised to fire if that officer made a move. Bloodshed was avoided when a quick-thinking Meunier ordered his Foot Guides out of the room, then politely requested Reynier and his colleagues to submit to their commander-in-chief. Reynier and the others gave in at once and were placed aboard a ship heading to France. On 30 August 1801, Menou surrendered Egypt to a British expedition.

The Foot Guides were renamed the Foot Chasseurs of the Consular Guard on 22 December 1801. Meunier subsequently served with the Army of the Ocean Coasts. He was promoted colonel of the 9th Light Infantry Regiment on 23 December 1803. He received the Officer's Cross of the Légion d'honneur on 14 June 1804. He married Émilie David on 27 March 1805. She was the daughter of the famous painter Jacques-Louis David.

== Empire ==
=== 1805–1807: Germany ===
Meunier served in the division of Pierre Dupont de l'Étang in the 1805–1807 campaigns. On 11 October 1805, the 9th Light Infantry fought at the Battle of Haslach-Jungingen as part of Dupont's 1st Division of Marshal Michel Ney's VI Corps. During this remarkable action, Dupont's 5,350 infantry, 2,169 cavalry and 18 guns held off 25,000 Austrians under Karl Mack von Leiberich. The division was involved in a mopping-up action at Herbrechtingen on 17 October. Dupont's division fought at the Battle of Dürenstein on 11 November. The 9th Light Infantry captured two colors from the Russian Viatka Musketeer Regiment during the action. Meunier became a commander of the Légion d'honneur on 25 December 1805.

On 17 October 1806, the 9th Light Infantry fought in the Battle of Halle as part of Marie François Rouyer's brigade. Dupont's division was part of Marshal Jean-Baptiste Bernadotte's I Corps. The French inflicted 5,000 casualties on the Prussians while only sustaining losses of 800 killed and wounded. Meunier was wounded in the chest on this day. His regiment lost three officers and a number of men in the Battle of Waren-Nossentin on 1 November. Dupont's division was held in reserve at the Battle of Lübeck on 6 November. The I Corps fought in the Battle of Mohrungen on 25 January 1807. Dupont's division was involved in a skirmish at Braniewo (Braunsberg) on 26 February. The I Corps under Claude Perrin Victor fought at the Battle of Friedland on 14 June 1807. At Friedland, Dupont's division performed noteworthy service in breaking the Russian center.

=== 1808–1812: Spain ===
At the Battle of Uclés on 13 January 1809, the division under François Amable Ruffin, formerly Dupont's, conducted a successful envelopment of the Spanish right flank. In the Battle of Medellín on 29 March, Ruffin's division remained in reserve.

During the Battle of Talavera on 27–28 July 1809, Marshal Victor ordered Ruffin's division to conduct a night assault on the British-held Cerro de Medellin. Ruffin placed Meunier's 9th Light in the center with the 24th Line to the right and 96th Line to the left. At 9:00 pm the columns descended from the French-held height, called the Cascajal, and began the attack. The 9th Light advanced in battalion columns with the battalions one behind the other. As it happened, the 24th Line got lost in the dark and never attacked while the 96th Line struggled to cross the ravine and only skirmished with the British. On the other hand, the 9th Light rapidly crossed the ravine and ascended the Cerro, striking the 7th Line Battalion of the King's German Legion. The German unit had its pickets placed too close so that the battalion was overrun within a few minutes, losing 150 casualties including many prisoners. As the two leading French battalions reached the top of the Cerro, the British division commander Rowland Hill rode up to them and was nearly captured. Though an officer with him was killed, Hill galloped away in the dark, rallied a nearby brigade and led them to retake the hilltop. The first British battalion to reach the top was stopped cold in a close-range musketry duel. When the other two British battalions arrived, the French were beaten and fled down the slope. The stray third battalion of the 9th Light soon joined the others in retreat. Meunier was shot in the head and the left leg. The 9th Light suffered about 300 casualties, including the badly-wounded Meunier and 65 others who were captured. A few days later, Talavera de la Reina was abandoned by the Spanish; Meunier and other wounded prisoners in the hospitals were liberated by the French.

Meunier was promoted general of brigade on 8 January 1810. He directed the converged grenadier battalion of Jean François Leval's division at the Battle of Barrosa on 5 March 1811. The grenadiers were held in reserve and when the division was beaten, the grenadiers covered the retreat of the 54th Line Infantry Regiment. The source mistakenly identified Meunier as a colonel. On 1 March 1812, Meunier led the 1st Brigade in Nicolas François Conroux's 1st Division of Marshal Jean-de-Dieu Soult's Army of the South. The brigade included two battalions of the 9th Light Infantry Regiment and three battalions of the 24th Line Infantry Regiment. Together with Georges Alexis Mocquery's 2nd Brigade (96th Line), the division numbered 182 officers and 5,263 men. Soon afterward, he traveled to Paris where his father-in-law painted his portrait. He then joined the army preparing to invade Russia.

=== 1812–13: Russia and Germany ===
Meunier fought in Russia, but the source does not state with which corps he served. In the Battle of Lützen on 2 May 1813, Meunier led a brigade in the 36th Infantry Division under Henri François Marie Charpentier in Marshal Jacques MacDonald's XI Corps. The units in his brigade that were engaged were three battalions of the 14th Provisional Demi-Brigade. At about 5:30 pm, Charpentier's division came into action on the extreme French left flank, preceded by a bombardment from the corps artillery. The 36th Division's 1st Brigade advanced against the village of Eisdorf while the 2nd Brigade attacked Kleingörschen. Eisdorf was seized by the French, but the French Imperial Guard had to intervene in the struggle before Kleingörschen finally fell.

On 20–21 May, the 14th and 15th Provisional Demi-Brigades fought at the Battle of Bautzen. On the first day, the XI Corps attacked the Allied center and captured the town of Bautzen. MacDonald's XI Corps continued attacking the Allied center on the second day, but Napoleon intended it to be a holding attack to distract the Allied generals from seeing the real threat to their right flank. The 36th Division fought in the Battle of Katzbach on 26 August. At the Battle of Leipzig on 16–19 October, Meunier's brigade in the 36th Division was made up of the 3rd and 4th battalions of the 3rd Light Infantry and the 3rd, 4th and 7th battalions of the 14th Light Infantry. Meunier was shot in the right arm on 16 October. He was promoted general of division on 5 November 1813.

=== 1814: France ===
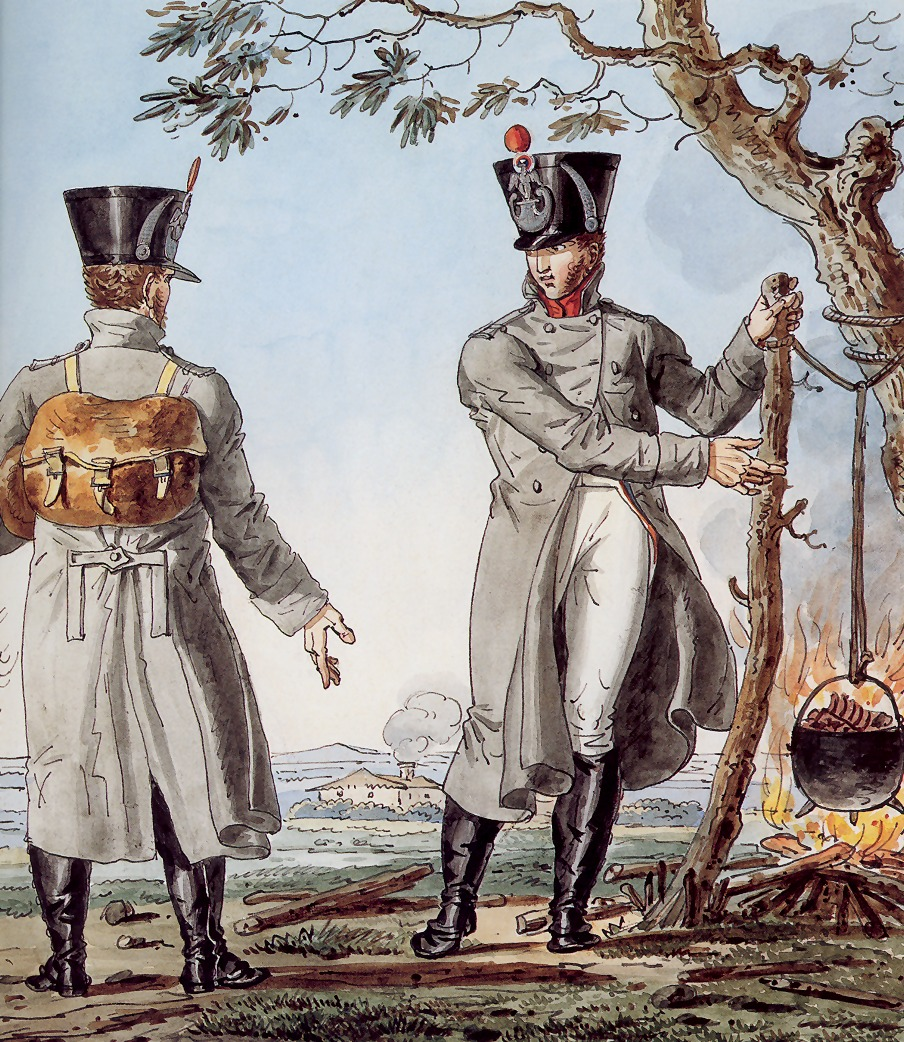
Since the 1814 campaign was fought January–March, Meunier's infantrymen wore greatcoats if they were lucky.

On 6 January 1814, Meunier's 1st Young Guard Voltiguer Division, with 5,250 men, was located near Nancy. On 11 January, the Allies roughly handled Guillaume-Charles Rousseau's brigade of the division during its retreat from Épinal. Soon after, Marshal Michel Ney arrived to take command of Meunier's division and other units. On 25 January 1814, Meunier's 1st Young Guard Division had two brigades, as follows. Jean Étienne Clément-Lacoste's brigade consisted of the 1st Voltiguer Regiment, 657 men, and the 2nd Voltiguer Regiment, 940 men. Rousseau's brigade was composed of the 3rd Voltiguers, 1,263 men, and the 4th Voltiguers, 1,144 men. Each regiment had two battalions and 140 gunners and artillery drivers were attached. At the Battle of Brienne on 29 January, Meunier's division attacked the village of Brienne-le-Château after nightfall but was unable to oust its Russian defenders. The division numbered about 3,000 men at the Battle of La Rothiere on 1 February. Meunier's troops became involved in the left flank fighting before being forced to withdraw.

At the start of the Six Days' Campaign, Ney's corps included Meunier's division with 4,133 soldiers and Philibert Jean-Baptiste Curial's 2nd Young Guard Division with 2,840 men. In the Battle of Champaubert on 10 February 1814, Marmont's corps led the attack, but Ney's corps became involved in the fighting after 11:00 am. At the Battle of Montmirail the next day, Meunier's division was engaged in a bitter struggle against the Russians at the village of Marchais-en-Brie. On 12 February, the 1st Young Guard Division joined in the pursuit of the Allies in the Battle of Château-Thierry. At the Battle of Vauchamps two days later, Ney's corps was present but not engaged.

The Guard was in reserve at the Battle of Montereau on 18 February 1814. At the Battle of Craonne on 7 March, Ney attacked prematurely on the right flank without artillery support, throwing Meunier's division at the Chemin des Dames ridge near Ailles around 9:00 am. Consequently, the 1st Young Guard Division suffered heavy losses. At 11:30 am after the French guns belatedly began bombarding the Russian position, Ney personally led Meunier's depleted division forward and they secured a foothold on the high ground. Despite cavalry support, Meunier's troops were driven off the ridge at 1:00 pm, but an hour later they won another foothold. As the Russians stubbornly retreated, Ney's survivors followed. At this time the 1st Young Guard Division was reduced to 865 men. Meunier was wounded in the right arm during the battle. During the Battle of Laon on 9 March, Ney's corps fought all day over the hamlet of Semilly, capturing it and being driven out more than once. The attack on Semilly was continued on 10 March before Napoleon was finally convinced that he must retreat.

At the Battle of Reims on 13 March 1814, Ney's corps consisted of the Young Guard divisions of Meunier and Curial and the 9th Division of Pierre François Xavier Boyer. At about this time, Napoleon reorganized the Young Guard into two divisions under Curial and Charpentier. At the Battle of Arcis-sur-Aube on 20–21 March, Ney's corps consisted of the divisions of Boyer, Louis Friant, Christophe Henrion and Jan Willem Janssens; Meunier's division was no longer in the order of battle. The remnants of the 1st, 2nd, 3rd and 4th Voltiguer Regiments were transferred to one of Curial's brigades.

== Later career ==
During the Hundred Days, Meunier was placed in command of a Young Guard division, but he did not fight at the Battle of Waterloo. He was appointed inspector general of Brittany during the Bourbon Restoration and the subsequent July Monarchy. He wrote a popular history of Napoleon for his children. He was awarded the Grand Cross of the Légion d'honneur on 30 April 1835. Meunier died at Paris on 14 April 1846. He was buried beside his father-in-law Jacques-Louis David in the Père-Lachaise Cemetery, 56th division, 1st line. MEUNIER, C. is inscribed on the south pillar of the Arc de Triomphe.
