= Friant =

Friant can mean either

- Louis Friant, French general during the Napoleonic Wars
- Friant, California, a town in the United States
