= Battle of Reims (1814) =

1814 battle during the War of the Sixth Coalition

- Part of the Campaign of France of the Sixth Coalition
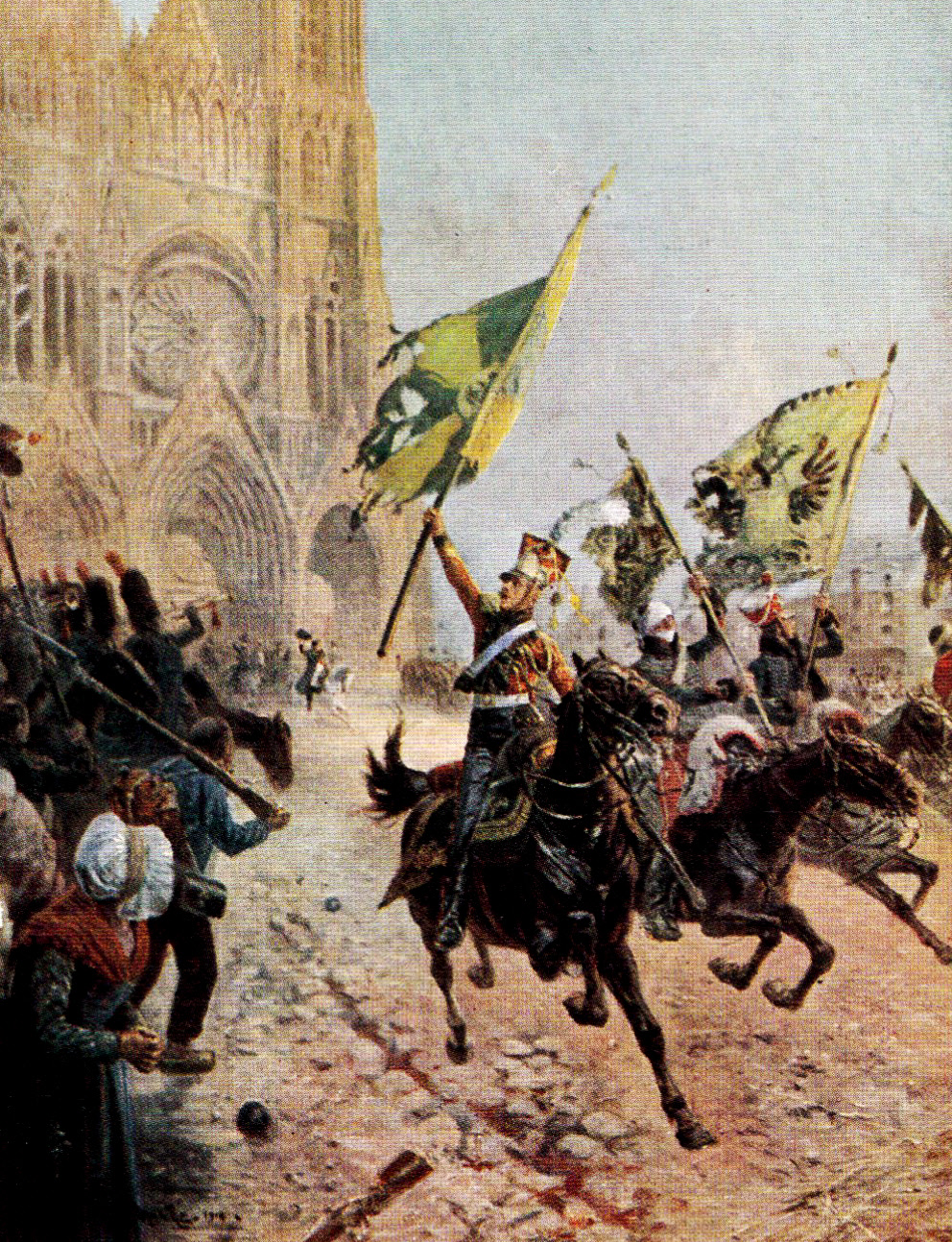
- The Last Victory, by Maurice Orange
Date	12 and 13 March 1814
Location	Reims, French Empire 49.2628°N 4.0347°E
Result	Coalition victory – 12th; French victory – 13th

Belligerents
(First French Empire) France	(Russian Empire) Russia (Kingdom of Prussia) Prussia

Commanders and leaders
12 March: (First French Empire) Jean Lacoste-Duvivier (POW); 13 March: (First French Empire) Napoleon Bonaparte (First French Empire) Auguste de Marmont (First French Empire) Michel Ney	(Russian Empire) Emmanuel de Saint-Priest (DOW) (Russian Empire) Georgi Emmanuel (Kingdom of Prussia) Friedrich von Jagow

Strength
12 March: 3,000–4,000 of the National Guard; 13 March: 8,000–10,000	12 March: 13,400–15,000; 13 March: 11,800–14,600; • Russia: 7,800–9,000; • Prussia: 4,000–5,600

Casualties and losses
12 March: entire force; 13 March: 700	12 March: unknown; 13 March: 6,000–8,000
- Location within France

War of the Sixth Coalition:
Campaign in north-east France
current battle
Napoleon in command
Napoleon not in command

The Battle of Reims (12–13 March 1814) was fought at Reims, France between an Imperial French army commanded by Emperor Napoleon and a combined Russian-Prussian corps led by General Emmanuel de Saint-Priest. On the first day, Saint-Priest's Russians and General Friedrich Wilhelm von Jagow's Prussians easily captured Reims from its French National Guard garrison, capturing or killing more than half of its defenders; this event is also mentioned as the storming of Reims. On the second day, an overconfident Saint-Priest carelessly deployed his forces west of the city, not grasping that Napoleon was approaching with 20,000 troops. Too late, Saint-Priest realized who he was fighting and tried to organize a retreat. In the battle that followed, the French army struck with crushing force and the Allies were routed with serious losses. During the fighting, Saint-Priest was struck by a howitzer shell and died two weeks later.

== Background ==
On 9–10 March 1814, a 100,000-strong Allied army led by Field Marshal Gebhard Leberecht von Blücher defeated Emperor Napoleon's 39,000-man Imperial French army in the Battle of Laon. The French lost 4,000 killed and wounded plus 2,500 men, 45 guns and 130 caissons captured. The Allies admitted only 744 casualties. Another source stated that the Allies sustained 4,000 casualties while inflicting 7,500 on the French. Early on the second day, Blücher was so ill with an eye infection that he temporarily handed over command to his chief of staff August Neidhardt von Gneisenau. Though Blücher had issued orders to attack the French that day, the new commander cancelled them. Consequently, Napoleon was able to disengage his battered army and withdraw almost unmolested to Soissons. Without Blücher's guiding hand, the Allied corps commanders began to clash with one another. Ludwig Yorck von Wartenburg tried to resign his corps command and was only persuaded to remain by Blücher.

At dawn on 11 March, Napoleon's army began its retreat to Soissons where it formed for battle at 3:00 pm. Only 1,500 Russians mounted a pursuit and they were easily kept at bay by the French rearguard. The right wing of Marshal Auguste de Marmont, whose corps had been routed at Laon, retreated to Fismes. On 11–12 March Napoleon organized a defense at Soissons and issued orders for his eastern garrisons to break out and harass the Allied supply lines going back to the Rhine River.

Not only did the French army suffer heavy casualties at Laon, it also lost between 5,400 and 8,000 men at the Battle of Craonne on 7 March. Napoleon assigned Marshal Édouard Mortier to command 8,000–9,000 infantry in the divisions of Joseph Boyer de Rébeval, Henri François Marie Charpentier, Charles-Joseph Christiani, Philibert Jean-Baptiste Curial, Claude Marie Meunier, Paul-Jean-Baptiste Poret de Morvan and 4,000 cavalry in the divisions of Nicolas-François Roussel d'Hurbal and Louis Michel Pac, and a march regiment. One battalion of the Legion of the Vistula, 600 Polish lancers, three cavalry march regiments, two companies of coast guard gunners, two sapper companies and 1,000 conscripts arrived as reinforcements from Paris. A new cavalry unit called the Converged Squadrons Division was formed and assigned to Sigismond Frédéric de Berckheim.

Napoleon disbanded the two Young Guard corps of Marshals Michel Ney and Claude Perrin Victor and Poret de Morvan's provisional division. Extra officers and non-coms were sent to Paris to recruit while the survivors were consolidated into the divisions of Curial and Charpentier. After reorganization, Mortier's 10,609-strong corps consisted of Christiani's 2,034 men, Curial's 2,796 men, Charpentier's 2,755 men, 2,062 cavalrymen and 962 gunners. The remainder of the army was formed into Marmont's 7,200 soldiers, Louis Friant's 3,600 Old Guards, Boyer de Rébeval's 3,000 men, the 2,400 sabers of the I Cavalry Corps, Berckheim's 1,700 horsemen and Horace Sebastiani's 4,400 guard cavalrymen.

== Allies capture Reims ==
Saint-Priest, a French émigré, led the Russian 8th Infantry Corps, which was made up of the 11th and 17th Infantry Divisions. Each division consisted of four line infantry and two jäger regiments. At the beginning of 1814, the corps numbered 11,900 soldiers and formed part of Louis Alexandre Andrault de Langeron's 43,000-strong army corps. On 31 December 1813, the 8th Corps executed a successful assault crossing of the Rhine River near Koblenz. After this operation the corps advanced to Dinant on the Meuse River. On 15 February, Saint-Priest's corps was ordered to take over the Siege of Mainz. By early March, Saint-Priest had moved west to occupy Châlons-sur-Marne and Vitry-le-François. Fresh from the blockade of Erfurt, Jagow brought his Prussian brigade to join Saint-Priest.

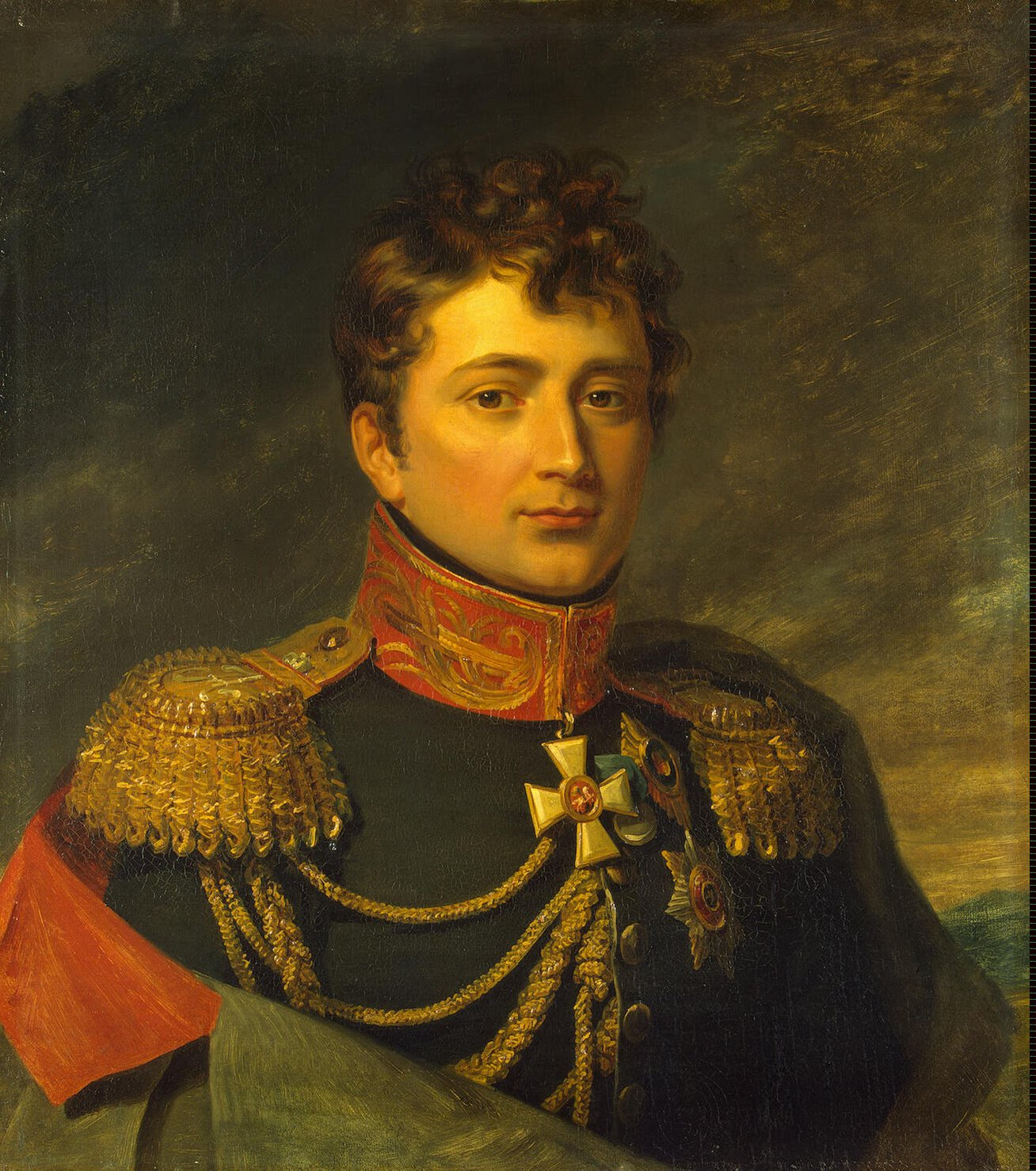
Emmanuel de St-Priest

In 1814, Reims had a population of 30,000 and was one of the most important cities of France. The city was surrounded by a wall and the Vesle River flowed through the city from southeast to northwest. The Soissons suburb was on an island to the southwest, opposite the city. Reims was 38 miles (61 km) north of Châlons-sur-Marne and 31 miles (50 km) east of Soissons. Napoleon was aware that Reims was in grave danger but he could only spare the Honor Guards cavalry division under Jean-Marie Defrance to watch the crossings of the Aisne River. The city's garrison was commanded by Jean Corbineau and was made up of 4,000 National Guards, a handful of line infantry and eight artillery pieces. Another authority asserted that the French garrison numbered only 1,256 infantry and 150 cavalry. These included details from the 15th, 43rd, 50th, 66th and 138th Line Infantry, 1st and 3rd Gardes d'Honneur, 2nd Eclaireurs and Guard artillery.

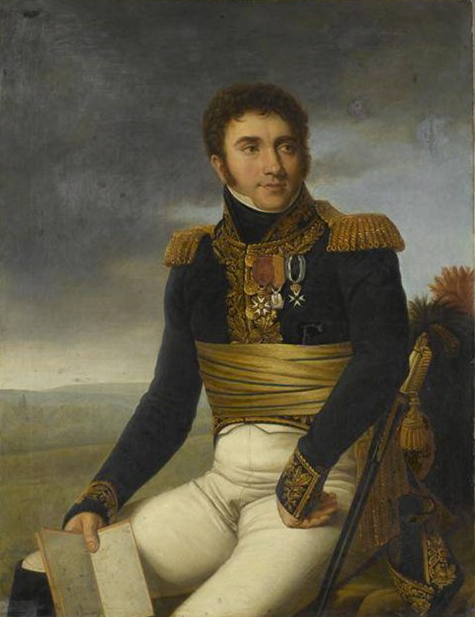
Jean-Marie Defrance

Saint-Priest's force included the 8-battalion 11th Division led by Ivan Stepanovich Gurgalov, four battalions from the 17th Division under Igor Maximovich Pillar, two dragoon regiments commanded by Georgi Emmanuel, the 3-regiment 1st Horse Chasseur Division directed by Ivan Davidovich Pandschulishev and at least 12 guns. Attached to the force was Jagow's Prussian brigade which had three battalions each of the 1st Pommeranian (919 men) and 5th Kurmärk (810 men) Landwehr Regiments, one battalion each of the 3rd Pommeranian (380 men) and 2nd Neumark (263 men) Landwehr Regiments, elements of the 7th Kurmärk (77 sabers) and 1st West Prussian (41 sabers) Landwehr Cavalry Regiments, a battery with eight 6-pound cannons and a battery with six 7-pound howitzers. (Note: The low numbers of Prussian cavalry may be due to a typographical error in the "rank and file" column. The 7th Kurmärk listed 9 officers, 8 non-coms, 2 musicians and 58 troopers (258?) while the 1st West Prussian listed 4 officers, 14 non-coms, 2 musicians and 21 troopers (210?). It is unlikely that Saint-Priest guarded his left flank with only 118 Prussian horsemen when he had five Russian cavalry regiments available. Nafziger's Prussian returns come to only half of the 5,600 listed by Smith.) There were 7,800 Russians and 5,600 Prussians, including two 4-squadron regiments of Landwehr cavalry.

The three attacking columns assembled at Cormontreuil at 3:00 am on 12 March 1814. Emmanuel's column consisted of the Kiev Dragoons, Riazan Infantry Regiment and 33rd Jägers plus two Prussian battalions, two cannons and two howitzers. Pillar's column included the rest of the Russian infantry, 50 horsemen, two Prussian battalions and two howitzers. Jagow's column had six Prussian battalions 150 cavalry and 10 artillery pieces. Jagow's column assaulted Reims between the Épernay and Soissons roads, from the southwest. Covered by the fire of two 12-pound cannons, the Prussians broke into the city at the Paris gate. Pillar's column moved from the southeast along the north bank of the Vesle. The column under Emmanuel attacked from the northeast down the Rethel road, while the Kiev Dragoons and the Chernigov Horse Chasseurs stormed from the northwest down the Laon road. The attack was a complete surprise.

Emmanuel slowly pushed a Young Guard cadre back to the Place des Arcades. Meanwhile, Pillar's troops forced their way into the city by the Châlons gate and followed the edge of the city wall to get behind the French defenders. The Young Guards tried to fight their way through Pillar's men but were soon forced to surrender. A body of defenders tried to get away north to Berry-au-Bac but they were intercepted by Russian cavalry and over 200 survivors were captured. Some French defenders retreated to the northwest along the north bank of the Vesle. Though pursued by Allied horsemen, they escaped when Defrance's six squadrons of honor guards and hussars arrived in time to cover their withdrawal. Altogether, 2,500 French infantry and 11 guns fell into Allied hands in the city. A second source stated that 100 men of the 1,356-man garrison were killed and most of the remainder captured, including General Jean-Laurent Lacoste-Duvivier.

Emmanuel deployed the Kiev Dragoons at La Neuvillette north of Reims. They clashed inconclusively with Defrance's cavalry for the remainder of the day. Saint-Priest was anxious to quickly establish contact with Blücher's army via Berry-au-Bac. The rest of the day was spent rounding up French soldiers trapped in the city. Saint-Priest's Russians camped inside Reims while Jagow's Prussians bivouacked in the villages on the west side of the city. Scouts were sent as far west as Fismes but patrolling was not aggressive. The Russian commander was aware of the Allied victory at Laon and did not expect any trouble. When he heard that Reims had fallen, Gneisenau asserted that the French were not capable of quickly retaking the city.

== Battle ==
=== Approach march ===
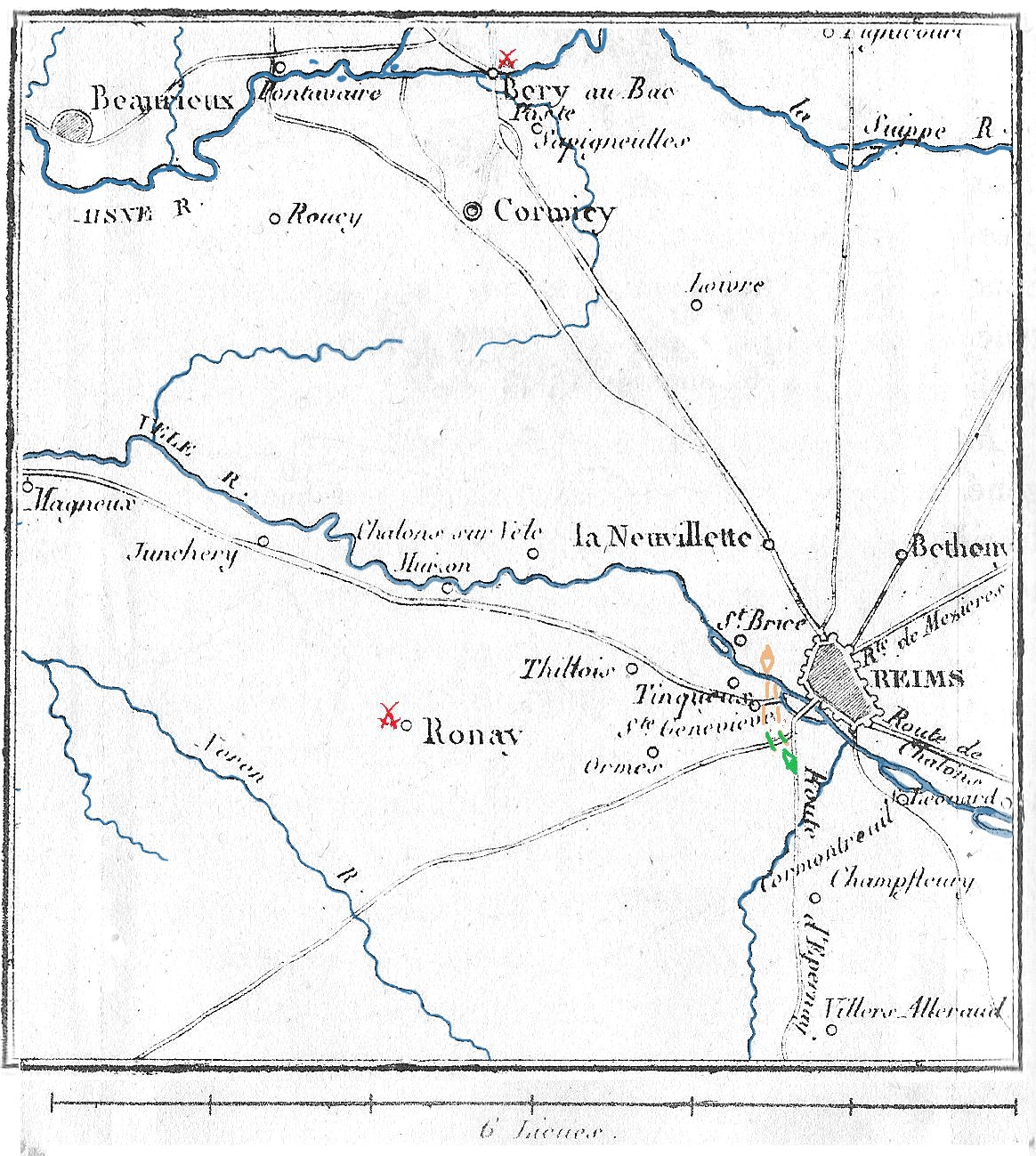
Map shows Reims, Rosnay (Ronay), Berry-au-Bac, and the Aisne and Vesle (Vêle) Rivers.

When Napoleon heard that Saint-Priest captured Reims he realized that he might score a cheap victory over the Allies. A success at Reims would cut the link between the army Blücher to the north and Karl Philipp, Prince of Schwarzenberg's Allied army to the south. The war was going badly for Napoleon. Marshal Jacques MacDonald was falling back before Schwarzenberg, Eugène de Beauharnais was in a tight spot in Italy, Marshal Pierre Augereau was losing territory in the south. The political situation also appeared dire. The Allies were negotiating the Treaty of Chaumont in order to more closely bind their alliance against the French emperor and the French people were tired of the war. Napoleon needed a quick victory to restore his reputation. The emperor wrote, "My intention being to attack Saint-Priest near Reims tomorrow, to defeat him and reoccupy the town".

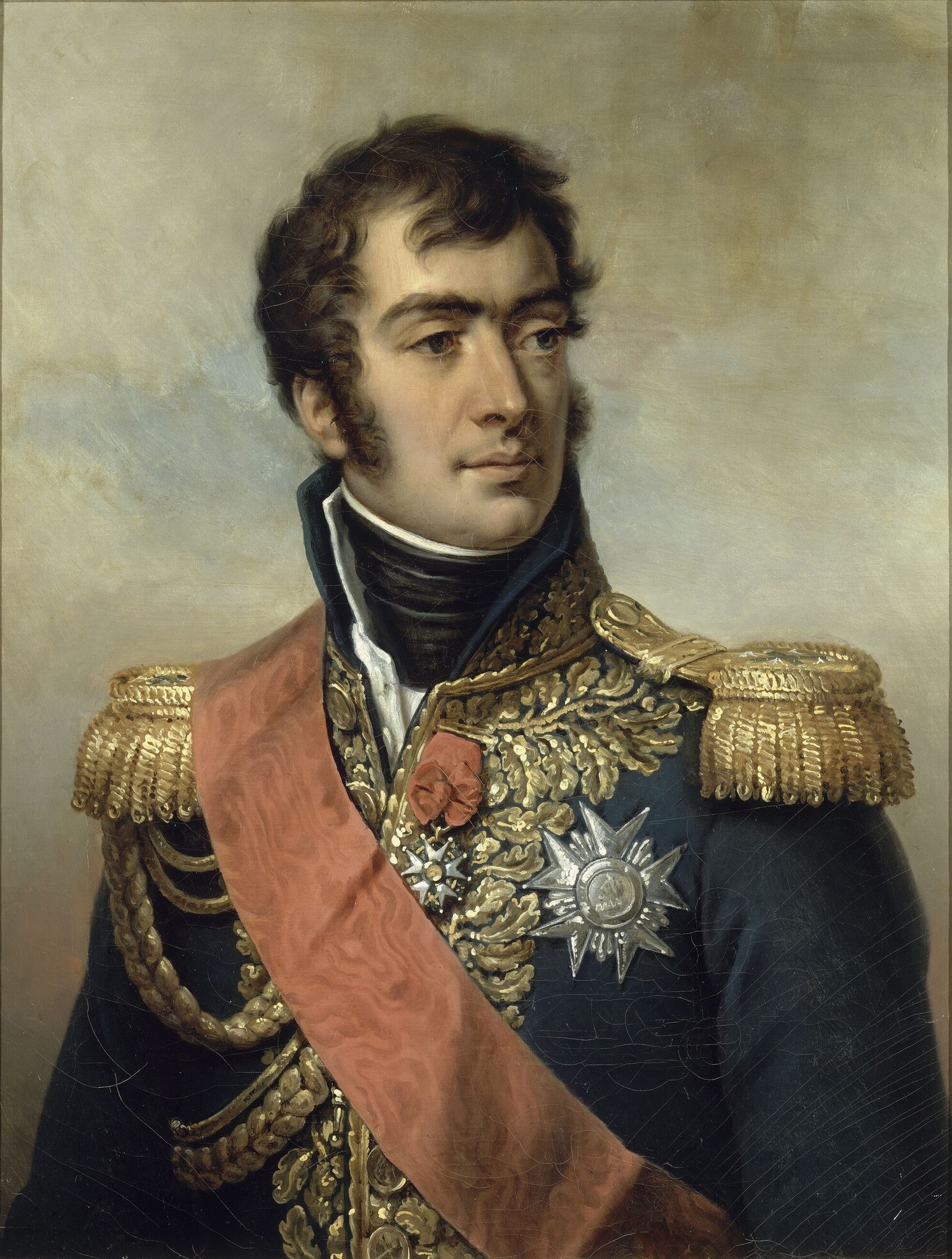
Auguste de Marmont

Napoleon left Mortier with 8,000 infantry and 4,000 cavalry to hold Soissons. Augustin Daniel Belliard led Mortier's cavalry which included a brigade from Berckheim's division. Mortier was instructed to defend the Aisne on either side of Soissons but not to allow himself to be drawn into a general battle. Napoleon ordered Marmont with the VI Corps and the I Cavalry Corps to march from Fismes toward Reims starting on the morning of 13 March. They would be followed by all the Guard Cavalry, Friant's division, Pierre François Xavier Boyer's brigade and the Legion of the Vistula battalion. The stage was set for the French soldiers to do some epic marching. Friant began his march from Soissons at 2:00 am and arrived before Reims at 4:00 pm, while Marmont set out from Fismes at 6:00 am. Ney's infantry started from Soissons around 8:00 am and got to Reims before 4:00 pm. Napoleon set out from Soissons with the Guard cavalry service squadrons.

Étienne Tardif de Pommeroux de Bordesoulle's I Cavalry Corps led Marmont's advance. After obtaining local guides, the column left the main road at Jonchery-sur-Vesle and followed a route through Sapicourt to Rosnay. At Rosnay, they surprised several squadrons of Prussian cavalry which fled in a panic. One battalion of the 3rd Pommeranian Landwehr Regiment was at Rosny while a second battalion was at Muizon on the Vesle. The 5th Kurmärk Landwehr had one battalion at Gueux and a second one at Thillois. The battalion in Rosnay fell back fighting to Gueux and finally to Ormes. While defending themselves in the Ormes cemetery, the Prussians were overwhelmed by Pierre Pelleport's infantry brigade; many surrendered while others were cut down by the 10th Hussars and the 1st Gardes d'Honneur from Cyrille Simon Picquet's cavalry brigade. While he was inspecting a camp at Gueux, Jagow was surprised by French cavalry and galloped away on an unsaddled horse. Caught unaware as they cooked supper, many of the Prussians at Muizon and Thillois left their shoes and coats behind in their flight.

Saint-Priest deployed his Allied troops on the west side of Reims in a double line supported by 24 field guns. His right flank rested on the Vesle River, his center on the Tinqueux heights and his left flank at the La Muire ravine. The 1st Pommeranian Landwehr and 12 guns were posted near Bezannes on the left. One battalion of the Neumark Landwehr was at Cormontreuil while a second battalion guarded the bridge at Sillery to the southeast of Reims. The Prussian cavalry deployed on the far left while Russian cavalry held the far right flank. Saint-Priest established an artillery battery on the Sainte-Geneviève plateau which was supported by the Riazan Infantry, the 1st and 33rd Jagers and the Kharkov and Kiev Dragoons. This force was placed under the direction of Adam Ivanovich Bistrom. Saint-Priest was still convinced that the French activity was a simple reconnaissance.

=== Assault ===
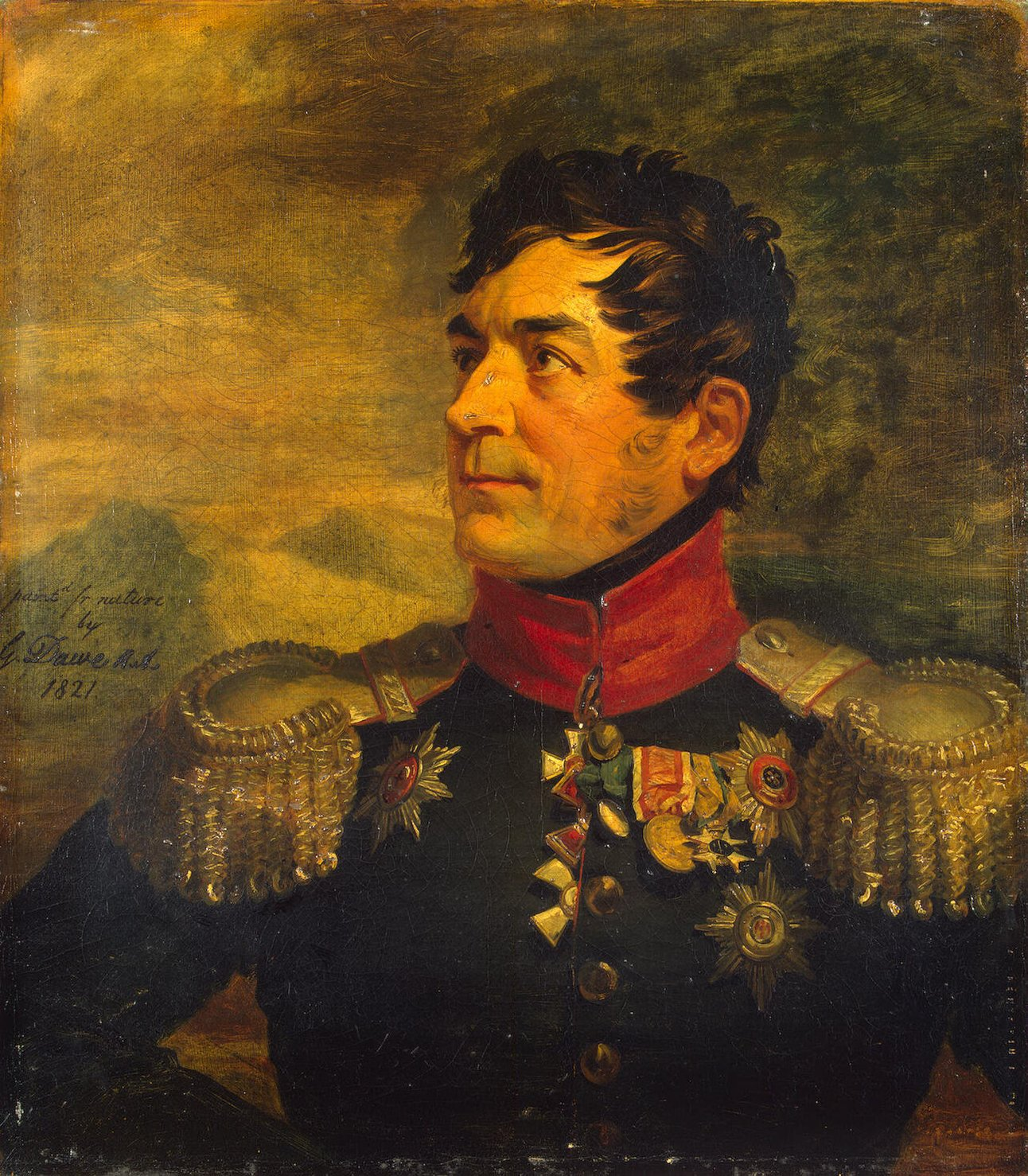
Georgiy Emmanuel

Bordesoulle's horsemen began pressing back Bistrom's troops. In the early afternoon, Napoleon reached the battlefield. Since the infantry under Ney and Friant had not yet arrived, the French emperor instructed Bordesoulle and Defrance to withdraw a little and ordered the cannons to cease fire. The lack of serious action satisfied Saint-Priest that he had nothing to worry about. The Russian commander gave no orders to move the corps wagon train which was parked in Reims. He believed his defenses were manned in sufficient strength. By 4:00 pm Ney and Friant were on hand. With evening only two hours away, Napoleon ordered an immediate attack.

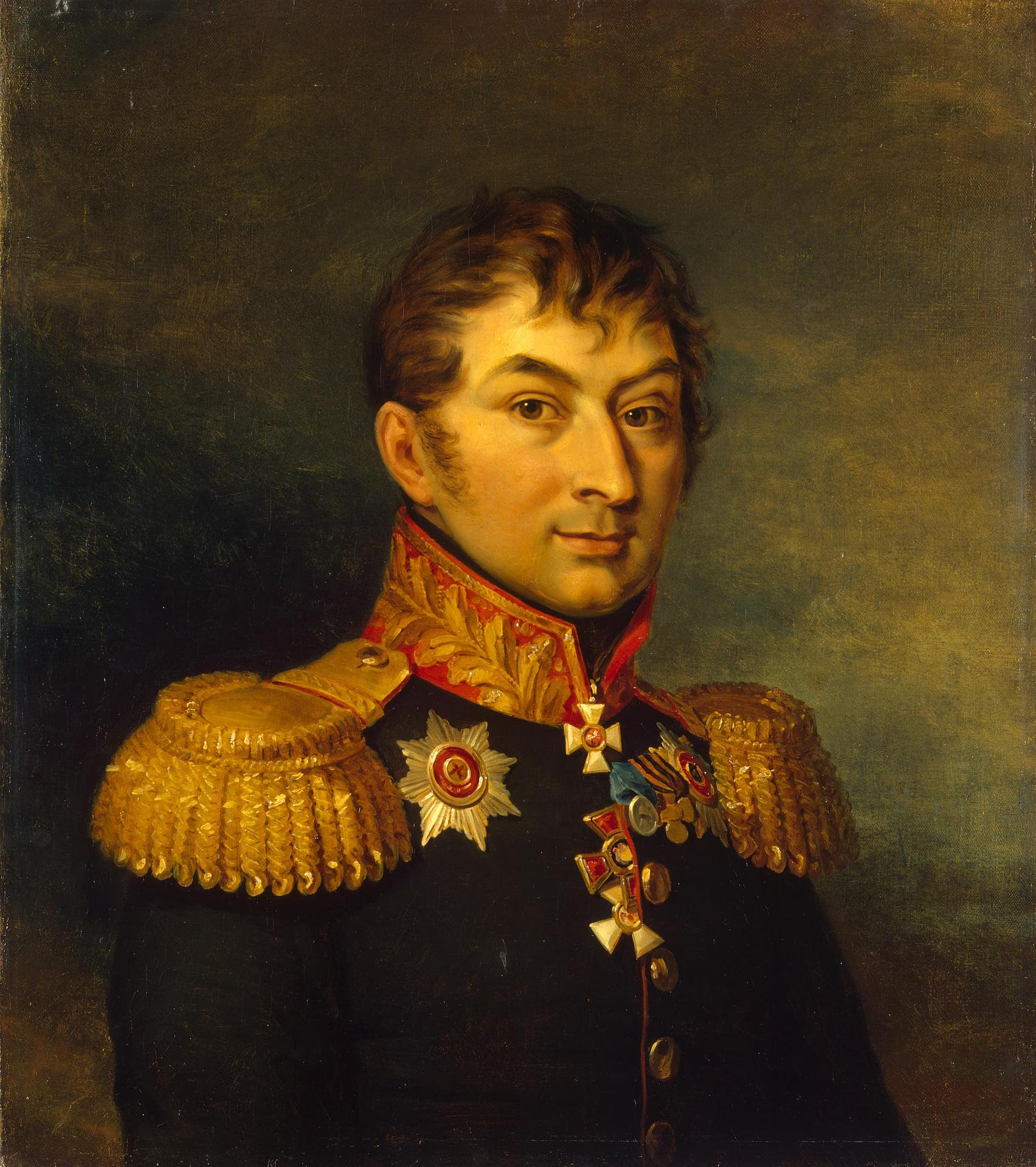
Ivan Pandschulishev

Defrance's cavalry and Étienne Pierre Sylvestre Ricard's infantry division led the assault. The Guard cavalry divisions of Rémi Joseph Isidore Exelmans and Pierre David de Colbert-Chabanais, under the direction of Sebastiani, advanced on Ricard's flanks. Farther south, Bordesoulle's divisions moved toward Bezannes with Christophe Antoine Merlin's division leading. Bordesoulle's thrust was designed to prevent the Prussians from retreating to the southeast via Sillery. The French artillery took position at Croix-Saint-Pierre to the north of the Soissons road while Friant and Pierre Boyer were held in reserve. Ricard's division crossed the La Muire ravine and forced its way onto the Sainte-Geneviève heights, splitting the center of the Allied line and forcing the Russians back toward Reims.

The violence of the assault convinced Saint-Priest that he was facing Napoleon himself. He hastily ordered his second line to retreat through Reims in the direction of Laon. The Russian commander directed his wagon train to go south to Châlons and asked Bistrom to cover the withdrawal. The retrograde movement of the Prussians through the Reims suburb became confused and Jagow was unable to unsnarl it. When Saint-Priest and his staff rode to a place between the Soissons road and Tinqueux village, they drew fire from the French artillery on the Croix-Saint-Pierre heights. Saint-Priest was hit in the shoulder by a howitzer shell and thrown senseless from his horse. A second source stated that the projectile was a solid shot. The next ranking officer, Pandschulishev was injured earlier in the day. Unable to mount a horse, he stayed behind in Reims. After witnessing Saint-Priest being struck down, Emmanuel should have assumed command of the troops. Instead, he "lost his head" and rode back into Reims to ask Pandschulishev what he ought to do. The Allied command structure went to pieces.

The Allied withdrawal soon degenerated into a scramble to safety as cannons were left behind and some foot soldiers jettisoned equipment in order to get away more rapidly. Philippe Paul, comte de Ségur led the 3rd Gardes d'Honneur, some cuirassiers and the 14th Young Guard Battery in a charge that forced some Russian dragoons into the Vesle. However, the Riazan Regiment, bearing the unconscious body of Saint-Priest, maintained its discipline. Pandschulishev ordered six battalions to hold the city walls. Caught between Russians manning the Reims defenses and the withdrawing Riazan Regiment, Ségur's horsemen were trapped and shot down by the score. Next, Ricard's infantry tried to storm the Soissons gate but were driven back by intense musketry. Marmont ordered a battalion into the houses near the walls and instructed the soldiers to pick off the defenders.

Skirmishing went on until 11:00 pm when artillery was wheeled into position to fire on the gate. Though a number of gunners were shot down by the Russian defenders, 16 cannons of the Guard artillery blew open the gate in a furious barrage. Cuirassiers charged into Reims and soon cleared the streets of the Allies. Napoleon and his staff entered Reims at midnight. Another source stated that Napoleon's entrance was an hour later and added that the townspeople turned out to welcome him. Meanwhile, utilizing a bridging train, Exelmans' division and some Polish horsemen crossed the Vesle and headed for the road to Berry-au-Bac. They waded into the retreating column of Jagow and Emmanuel, turning it into a fleeing mob. When Jagow arrived at Berry-au-Bac early on 14 March he reported having only two intact battalions.

== Results ==
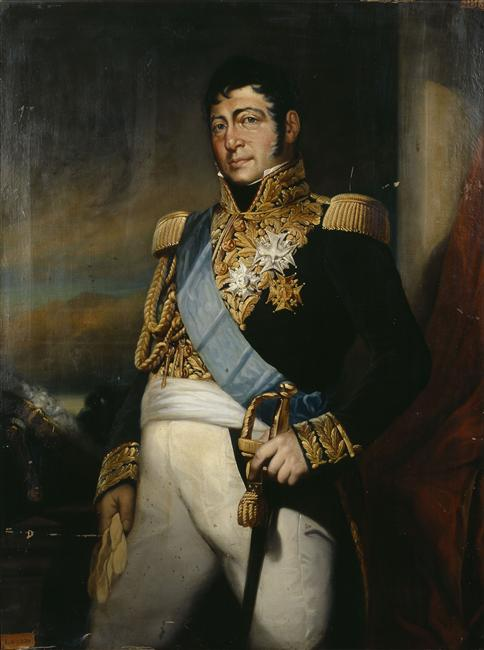
Étienne de Bordesoulle

Napoleon claimed in his battle report that the gunner who fatally wounded Saint-Priest was the same one who killed Jean Victor Marie Moreau at the Battle of Dresden. Historian Digby Smith wrote that French casualties in the recapture of Reims were about 900. The Russians lost 1,400 men and 12 guns, while the Prussians suffered casualties of 1,300 men and 10 guns. George Nafziger stated that the French suffered 700–800 casualties including a badly-wounded Ségur. Nafziger listed Allied losses as 700–800 dead, 1,500–1,600 wounded and 2,500–3,500 captured, along with 11–14 guns and 100 caissons or wagons. The Prussians admitted losses of 1,300 infantry, 85 cavalry, six howitzers and four cannons. David G. Chandler asserted that the French inflicted 6,000 casualties on the Allies while sustaining losses of 700. While the French army brought 20,000 to 25,000 troops onto the battlefield, no more than 10,000 were actually employed against the 14,500 Allies.

Napoleon spent three days at Reims following his victory. With Blücher still recovering from sickness, Gneisenau did not trouble the French during that time. The French emperor sent Ney to seize Châlons-sur-Marne, which was done without opposition. Ney was joined by Jan Willem Janssens who gathered 3,000 men from the Ardennes garrisons. Meanwhile, Schwarzenberg's army advanced perilously close to Paris. Napoleon's problem was to lure the Allied army away from Paris. He decided to leave Marmont and Mortier with 21,000 soldiers to watch Blücher and move south toward Arcis-sur-Aube to threaten Schwarzenberg's supply line. The Battle of Arcis-sur-Aube was fought on 20–21 March 1814.

Napoleon had achieved a remarkable but ultimately hollow victory with troops whose morale had suffered due to the heavy casualties at Craonne and the defeat at Laon. According to the historian F.W.O. Maycock, success at Reims was, "surely one of the greatest triumphs of [Napoleon's] remarkable career, and speaks volumes for his powers as a leader of men". Napoleon once again interposed between the forces of Blücher and Schwarzenberg, putting him in position to move on the latter's line of communications.

== Notes ==
Footnotes

Citations

Preceded by Battle of Laon	Napoleonic Wars; Battle of Reims (1814)	Succeeded by Battle of Craonne
