= Joseph Boyer de Rébeval =

French division commander

Joseph Boyer de Rebeval
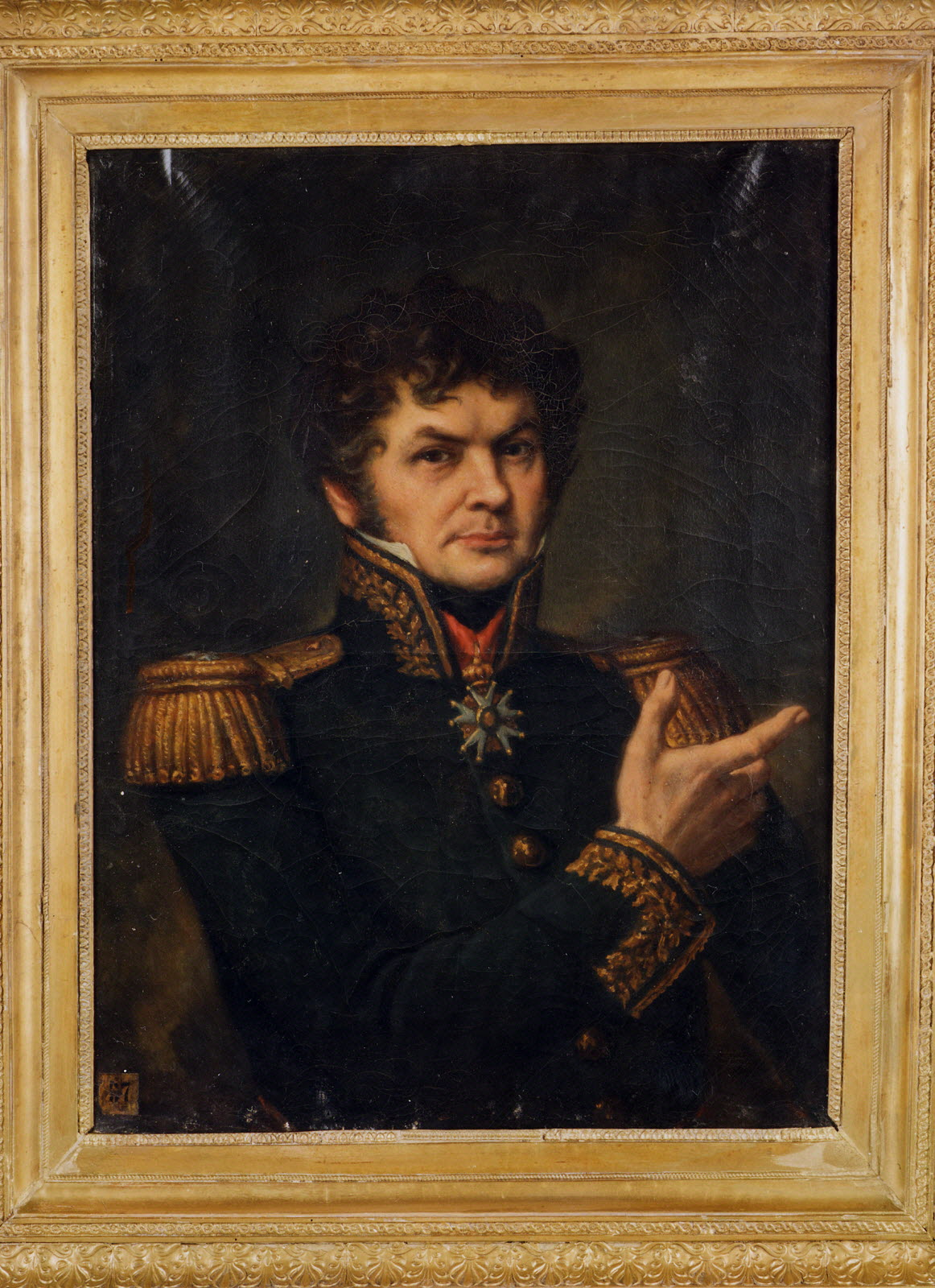
- Born: 20 April 1768; Vaucouleurs, France
- Died: 5 March 1822 (aged 53) Paris, France
- Allegiance: Kingdom of France; France
- Branch: Infantry
- Service years: (Kingdom of France) 1787–1792 (France) 1792–1815
- Rank: General of Division
- Conflicts: War of the First Coalition; Battle of Valvasone; War of the Second Coalition; War of the Fourth Coalition; Siege of Kolberg; War of the Fifth Coalition; Battle of Aspern-Essling; Peninsular War; War of the Sixth Coalition; Battle of Borodino; Battle of Dresden; Battle of Leipzig; Battle of Craonne; Battle of Laon; Battle of Reims; Battle of Arcis-sur-Aube; Hundred Days; Battle of Waterloo
- Awards: Légion d'Honneur, CC 1809
- Other work: Baron of the Empire, 1809

Joseph Boyer de Rébeval (French pronunciation: [ʒozɛf bwaje də ʁɛbval]; 20 April 1768 – 5 March 1822) became a French division commander during the later Napoleonic Wars. He enlisted in the French Royal Army in 1787 and earned promotions through the ranks in the War of the First Coalition and subsequent conflicts. He was wounded at Valvasone in March 1797. He emerged as a major in the Vélites of the Imperial Guard in 1806 and fought at Kolberg in 1807. He was promoted colonel of the 2nd Foot Chasseurs of the Guard in 1808. He fought at Wagram in 1809, winning promotion to general of brigade. He was wounded at Borodino in 1812. He commanded a Young Guard brigade at Dresden and Leipzig in 1813 and was promoted to general of division. He led a Young Guard division at Craonne, where he was wounded, and at Laon, Reims and Arcis-sur-Aube in 1814. During the Hundred Days he commanded units of the Imperial Guard at Waterloo in 1815 and retired soon afterward.
