= Battle of Venta del Pozo =

1812 battle during the Peninsular War

- Part of the Peninsular War
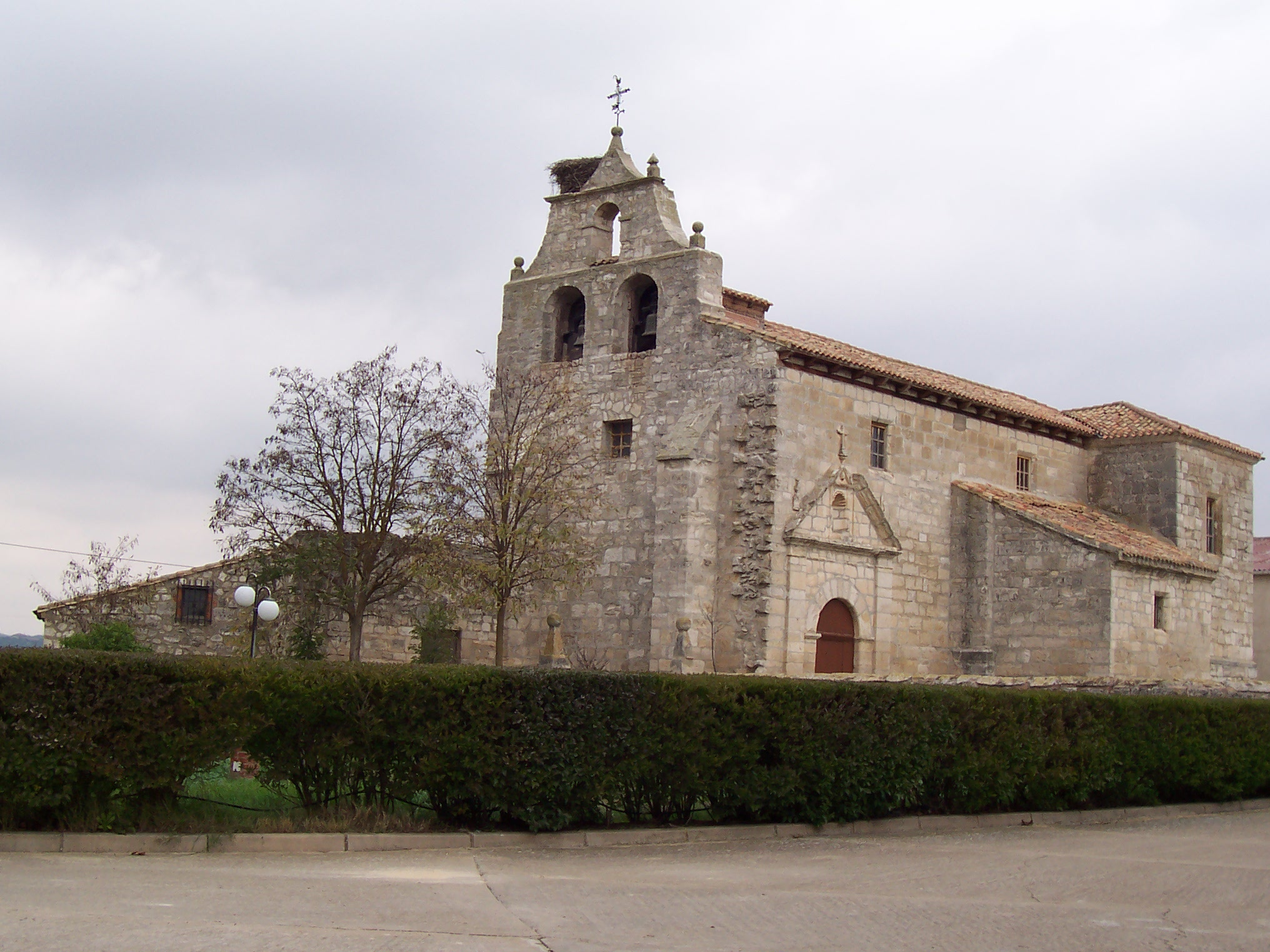
- City of Villodrigo
Date	23 October 1812
Location	Venta del Pozo, Villodrigo, Spain 42°08′11″N 4°04′53″W
Result	French victory

Belligerents
French Empire	United Kingdom (Note: Guerrillas also participated in the battle to a limited extent (on one flank). Their numbers are unknown.)

Commanders and leaders
Pierre Boyer; Jean-Baptiste Curto	Stapleton Cotton; Marquess of Wellington (Note: Participated in the second half of the battle)

Strength
3,200	2,800

Casualties and losses
141–300 killed, wounded or captured	165–250 killed or wounded 65–85 captured

Peninsular War
Castile 1811–13
current battle

The Battle of Venta del Pozo, also known as the Battle of Villodrigo by the French and Spanish, was a rear-guard action fought as part of the Peninsular War on 23 October 1812 between an Anglo-German force led by Major-General Stapleton Cotton and Marquess of Wellington against French troops under Major-Generals Pierre François Xavier Boyer and Jean-Baptiste Théodore Curto. A French victory was achieved by dislodging British forces from a series of defensive positions held successively by Cotton and Wellington. Despite repelling two French assaults on the last-held high ground, the British ultimately withdrew from the engagement to secure a safer position.

== Background ==
The Duke of Wellington's Anglo-Portuguese Army gave up its unsuccessful Siege of Burgos on 21 October 1812 and withdrew southwest toward Torquemada. Wellington's 35,000-man army was pursued by Maj-Gen Joseph Souham's reinforced Army of Portugal of 53,000 soldiers.

== Forces ==
Major-General Stapleton Cotton's rearguard included Colonel Colin Halkett's King's German Legion (KGL) brigade (1st and 2nd KGL Light battalions), Major-General George Anson's light cavalry brigade (11th, 12th, and 16th Light Dragoons), Major-General Eberhardt von Bock's heavy cavalry brigade (1st and 2nd King's German Legion Dragoons), and Norman Ramsay's RHA troop of six cannons. The total strength was 2,800 men.

Curto's light cavalry brigade was made up of the 3rd Hussars and the remnants of the 13th, 14th, 22nd, 26th, and 28th Chasseurs. Boyer's dragoon brigade included the 6th, 11th, 15th, and 25th Dragoons. Colonel Faverot, in charge of the 15th Chasseurs and Duchy of Berg Light Horse Lancers, and Colonel Béteille, head of the élite Gendarmes, also rode with the advanced guard. The French force numbered 3,200 men.

== Battle ==
On 23 October, Cotton drew up his cavalry in front of a stone bridge where the main highway crossed a deep, dry streambed. He planned to ambush the French advanced guard. As the French approached, Anson's cavalry would file across the bridge and presumably the French would closely follow. After the French had crossed, Ramsay's guns would open fire on them and Bock's dragoons would then charge them.

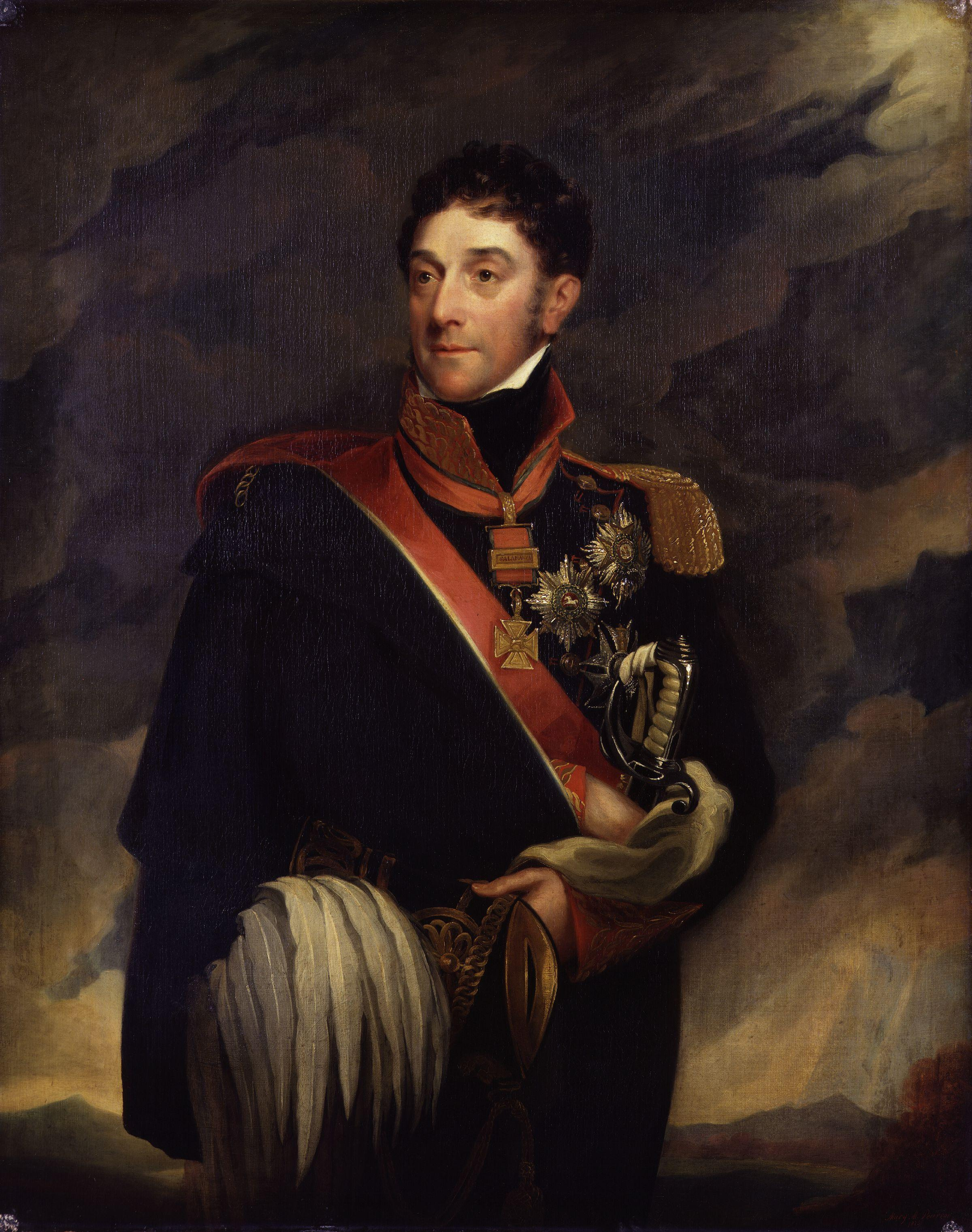
Stapleton Cotton, 1st Viscount Combermere.

Meanwhile, on the British left flank, Curto's hussars had crossed the dry stream bed further upstream and attacked mounted Spaniards (guerrillas only) under the command of Marquinez posted on the hills overlooking the battlefield. As the Spaniards came pouring down the hills, closely pursued by the French hussars, the whole mass fell upon the 16th Light Dragoon, which was simultaneously charged by French dragoons that had crossed the bridge.

The 16th Light Dragoon fell back in complete confusion and turned the wrong way, blocking both Ramsay's guns and Bock's intended charge zone. The Lancers of Berg, 15th Chasseurs, and Gendarmes then arrived in line towards the stream bed, which they found impassable. They quickly turned right, trotted over the bridge, turned left, and formed a line in front of Bock's heavy cavalry brigade. The Berg lancer squadron posted itself closest to the bridge, followed by the five squadrons of the 15th Hussars, and finally the four Gendarme squadrons.

At 17:00, before the last two Gendarme squadrons had finished positioning themselves, Bock's Dragoons attacked in two lines. The first line of three squadrons was reeling back when the second line entered the melee. Just before this charge, the last two Gendarme squadrons had managed to place themselves in such a way as to attack both Dragoon lines on their right flank. Eight to ten minutes of bitter fighting ensued, overlooked by both armies on the surrounding heights.

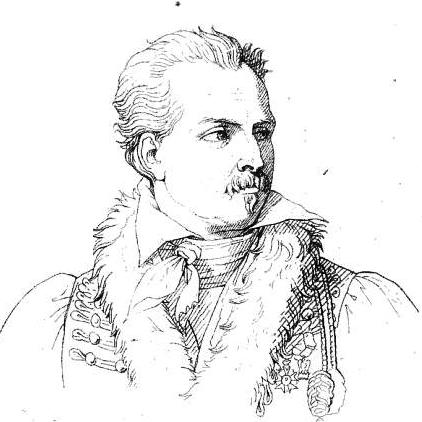
The Baron Pierre Boyer.

Bock's men retreated in disorder, followed by Anson's brigade. They soon became outflanked on both sides as more French dragoons came racing down upon them, causing the British cavalry to break in complete confusion. They finally rallied behind Halkett's two KGL infantry battalions as the Gendarmes, 15th Chasseurs, and Berg Lancers halted to also rally themselves. Boyer's Dragoons charged and broke Bock's dragoons a second time. Wellington, arriving on the field, then directed Halkett's squares to fire at the French Dragoons, which unsuccessfully charged the squares three times before pulling away. The arrival of French infantry then forced the Anglo-German force to retreat, but in good order. Cotton greatly distinguished himself by his "coolness, judgment, and gallantry."

The Allies lost 165 killed and wounded and 65 captured. The French lost between 200 and 300 casualties. Other sources state 250 killed and wounded for the Allies and 85 prisoners, five of which were officers, while the French had 7 killed and 134 wounded. One of them was Colonel Jean-Alexis Béteille, who was left for dead on the field after receiving twelve sword wounds (eight to the head, one of which cracked his skull open, and four to his left hand). French surgeons managed to save him. Several months later he was made brigadier general and officer of the Légion d'honneur by Napoleon himself.

== Battle honours ==
The German 1st and 2nd KGL Light battalions wore the "Venta del Pozo" battle honour until 1918 in their subsequent service with the Hanoverian and Prussian armies.

== Notes ==
Preceded by Second Battle of Polotsk	Napoleonic Wars; Battle of Venta del Pozo	Succeeded by Battle of Maloyaroslavets
