= Pierre François Xavier Boyer =

French division commander

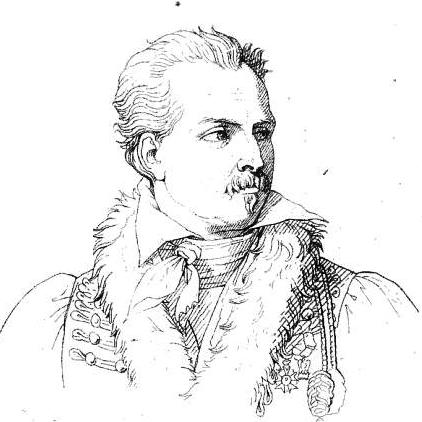
- Pierre François Xavier Boyer
- Born: 7 September 1772; Belfort, France
- Died: 11 July 1851 (aged 78) Lardy, Essonne, France
- Allegiance: France
- Branch: Infantry, Cavalry
- Service years: (France) 1792–1824 c. 1825–1828 (France) 1830–1839
- Rank: General of Division
- Conflicts: War of the First Coalition; War of the Second Coalition; Egypt invasion; Haitian Revolution; War of the Fourth Coalition; Battle of Jena; Battle of Pultusk; Battle of Friedland; War of the Fifth Coalition; Battle of Wagram; Peninsular War; Battle of Sobral; Battle of Salamanca; Battle of Venta del Pozo; Battle of Vitoria; Battle of Nivelle; Battle of the Nive; War of the Sixth Coalition; Battle of Mormant; Battle of Craonne; Battle of Laon; Battle of Arcis-sur-Aube; French conquest of Algeria
- Awards: Order of Saint-Louis, 1814; Légion d'Honneur, GC 1835
- Other work: Baron of the Empire, 1812

Pierre François Xavier Boyer (French pronunciation: [pjɛʁ fʁɑ̃swa ɡzavje bwaje]; 7 September 1772 – 11 July 1851) became a French division commander during the Napoleonic Wars. He joined a volunteer regiment in 1792. He fought in the Italian campaign of 1796 and participated in the French invasion of Egypt in 1798. He became a general of brigade in 1801 and took part in the Expedition to Saint-Domingue in 1802. While sailing back to France he was captured by the British. After being exchanged, he fought at Jena and Pultusk in 1806, Friedland in 1807 and Wagram in 1809. Transferred to Spain, Boyer led a dragoon division at Salamanca and Battle of Venta del Pozo in 1812 and Vitoria in 1813. He earned the nickname "Pedro the Cruel" for brutal actions against Spanish partisans. He led an infantry division at the Nivelle and the Nive in late 1813. His division was transferred to the fighting near Paris and he was promoted general of division in February 1814. He led his troops at Mormant, Craonne, Laon and Arcis-sur-Aube.

Because Boyer rallied to Napoleon during the Hundred Days, he was compelled to flee to Germany for a short time. After he was retired in 1824, he helped train the army of Muhammad Ali of Egypt. Restored to active service after the July Revolution of 1830, he was placed in command of Oran during the French conquest of Algeria. His superior complained about his harshness toward the local people, but Boyer was not relieved until 1833. He retired from active service in 1839 and died in 1851. BOYER is one of the names inscribed under the Arc de Triomphe, on Column 7.

== Spain ==
Boyer was chief of staff in Jean-Andoche Junot's VIII Corps during Marshal André Masséna's invasion of Portugal in 1810. The VIII Corps was held in reserve at the Battle of Bussaco but was involved in a skirmish with the British in the Battle of Sobral on 13–14 October 1810.

== 1814 ==
On 19 January 1814, Marshal Jean-de-Dieu Soult received the order to begin the transfer of the infantry divisions of Boyer and Jean François Leval to Napoleon's army operating near Paris. They began their march on 21 January. Boyer's division left behind Jean-Baptiste Pierre Menne's brigade, the 118th and 120th Line Infantry Regiments, and instead took David Hendrik Chassé's brigade, the 16th Light, 8th Line and 28th Line. Boyer received promotion to general of division on 16 February 1814. A detachment under Étienne Gauthier arrived in time to join Marshal Nicolas Oudinot's corps for the Battle of Mormant on 17 February. Present were two battalions each of the 2nd Light and 122nd Line and one battalion each of the 24th Line and 33rd Line. The 33rd was a new unit of conscripts that joined along the way.

On 22 February, Antoine Gruyer led 3,600 men of the 2nd Light, 24th Line, 36th Line and 122nd Line plus the 6th Chevau-léger Lancers in an attack on Méry-sur-Seine. There were 5,000 Russians and 1,200 Prussians in opposition. Both sides suffered about 800 casualties including Gruyer wounded. Chassé's 2nd Brigade, which was made up of the 16th Light, 8th Line, 28th and 54th Line, was not engaged. In the action, the French overran the village of Méry, but were unable to hold the part of the town on the north bank in the face of an Allied counterattack. Boyer later reported that the army of Gebhard Leberecht von Blücher was moving west along the Seine River. This alerted Napoleon that the Prussian general might be trying to cut his communications with Paris.

On 27 February, Napoleon followed Blucher's army which had moved northwest toward Meaux. At this time, Gruyer's brigade, under Boyer, was attached to Napoleon's army. Boyer's other brigade was left in the south with the army of Marshal Jacques MacDonald. Boyer's brigade was involved in a skirmish with Russian forces on 6 March. The next day during the Battle of Craonne, Boyer's brigade operated with Marshal Michel Ney's Young Guard corps. That morning Ney prematurely launched the divisions of Boyer and Claude Marie Meunier against the Russian left flank. Because Ney failed to provide artillery support, the initial attacks failed. When the French guns arrived, Meunier and Boyer's troops fought a costly battle with their enemies for several hours. At 2:30 pm, Boyer's men finally captured the village of Ailles on the extreme French right flank. For the rest of the day, Boyer followed up the Russian withdrawal.
