= Louis Friant =

French military commander

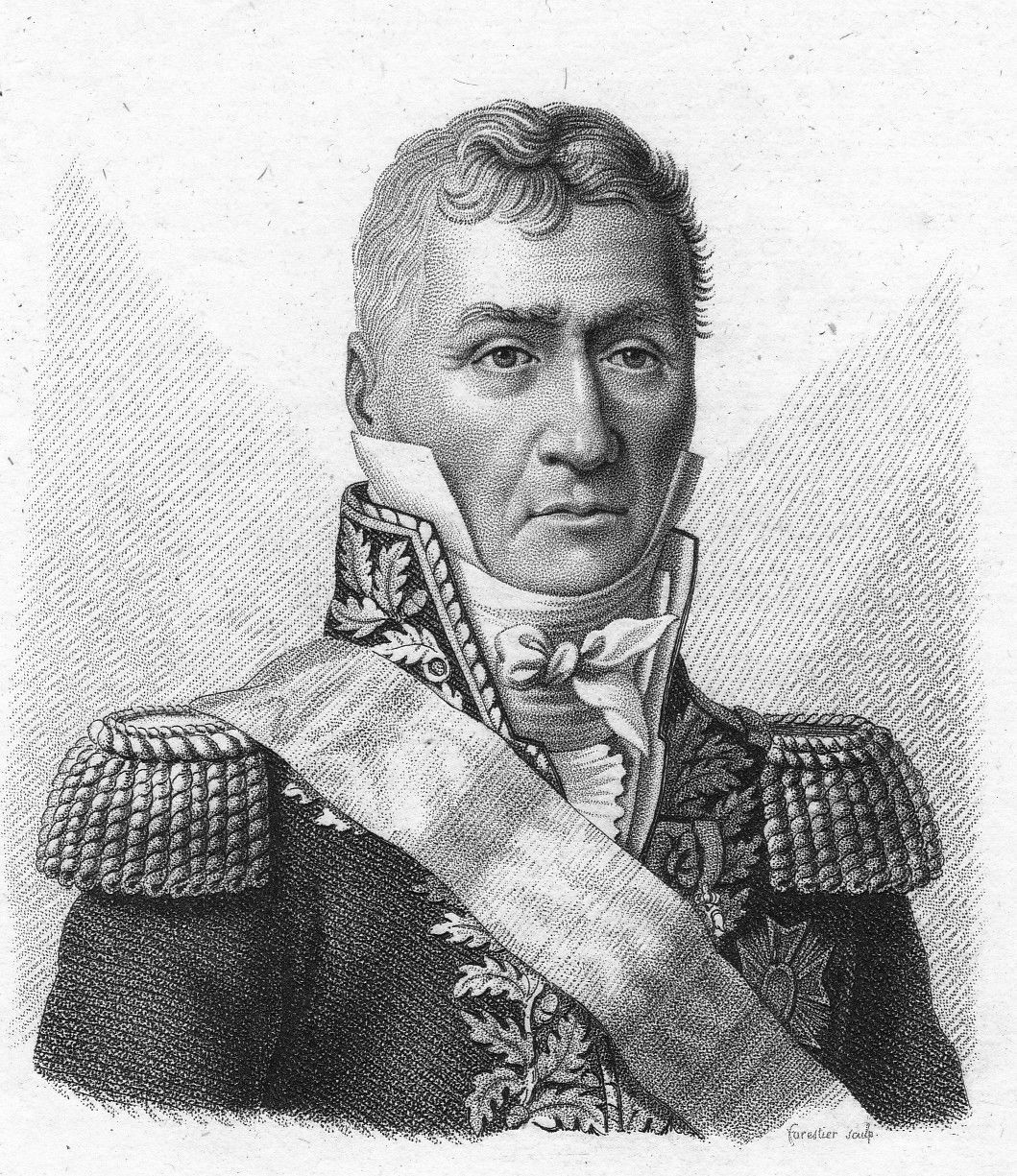
General Louis Friant

Louis Friant (French pronunciation: [lwi fʁijɑ̃]; 18 September 1758 – 24 June 1829) was a French general who fought in the French Revolutionary Wars and the Napoleonic Wars.

== Early life and French Revolutionary Wars ==
Friant was born in the village of Morlancourt, 8 km south of Albert near the river Somme, the son of a wax-maker. He enlisted in the Gardes Françaises in February 1781, at age 22, and rose to the rank of Corporal before leaving the service in 1787. With the outbreak of the French Revolution, Friant volunteered for the Garde Nationale of Paris in September 1789. He was elected lieutenant-colonel of the 9e Battalion de Paris in September 1792, leading that battalion on the German frontier under the Army of the Moselle until wounded in the left leg on 16 December 1793.

Returning to action as colonel of the 181e Demi-Brigade in March 1794, Friant took part in the great victory of Fleurus (a stone's throw from the future battlefield of Ligny/St-Amand) on 26 June 1794. He was briefly acting-commander of a brigade (July 1794) and a division (August 1794). He served at the sieges of Maastricht (October 1794) and Luxemburg (April 1795). He was promoted to Général de Brigade on 13 June 1795.

After a period as Military Governor of Luxemburg, Friant served with the Army of Sambre-et-Meuse in 1796 along the Rhine. In January 1797 he joined Bernadotte's Division of the Army of Italy. He served at the Battle of the Tagliamento (16 March 1797), and assumed command of the 5th Brigade, 3rd Division (30e and 55e Ligne) from June 1797.

=== Egypt ===
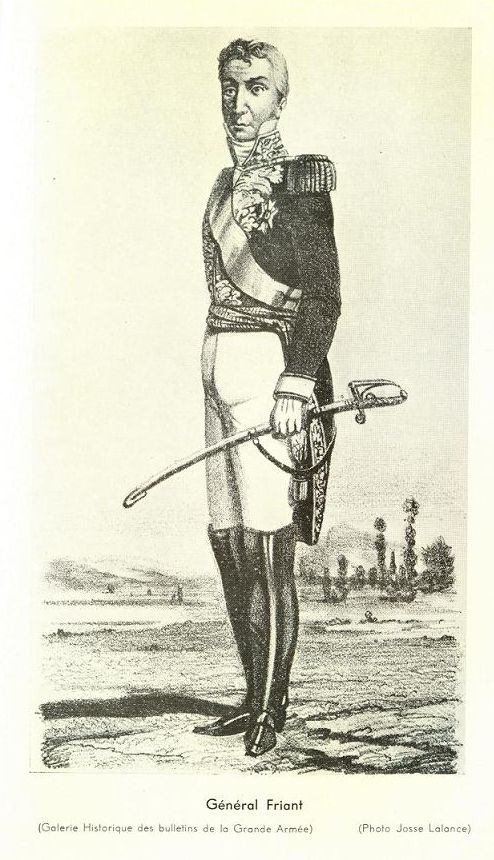
General Louis Friant

Friant commanded the 2nd Brigade (61e and 88e Ligne) of General Desaix's division in Egypt, taking part in the Battle of the Pyramids (21 July 1798), and in Desaix's brilliant campaign in Upper Egypt. He was provisionally promoted to Général de Division on 4 September 1799, and succeeded Desaix as commander in Upper Egypt after Desaix departed to play his decisive but fatal part in the Marengo campaign. Friant took a lead role in the suppression of the great revolt in Cairo in March–April 1800. Confirmed in the rank of Général de Division and named Governor of Alexandria in September 1800, he fought the British at the Second Battle of Aboukir (8 March 1801), and defended Alexandria through August 1801.

Repatriated with the remnants of the Army of the Orient, Friant served as an inspector-general of infantry in 1801–03 before joining the Corps of his brother-in-law Davout at the Camp of Bruges. There, he molded the 2ème Division, III Corps into "what arguably became the finest line division on the face of the earth" (Bowden, Napoleon and Austerlitz).

== Napoleonic Wars ==
=== High days of the Empire ===
In the Ulm-Austerlitz campaign of 1805, Friant's Division earned a reputation for rapid and effective marching. This quality was put to excellent use when the Division was summoned from Vienna to reinforce the Grande Armée at Austerlitz, marching 70 miles in 46 hours and arriving just in time to counterattack the Allies at Telnice and Sokolnice on the morning of 2 December 1805. In the ferocious fighting along the Goldbach stream, Friant had three horses killed under him.

Friant was awarded the Grand Eagle of the Legion of Honor on 27 December 1805. In the 1806 campaign, at the Battle of Auerstädt (14 October 1806) in which Davout's III Corps of 26,000 men faced and defeated the Prussian main body of 63,000, Friant's Division advanced on the right, turning the Prussian left flank. The infantry of Friant and Gudin, standing in square, withstood and shattered a massive cavalry attack led by Blücher himself.

In the Polish campaign, Friant's Division fought successfully at the forcing of the Ukra River on 24 December 1806. At the Battle of Eylau, Friant's Division arrived to reinforce the French right on the morning of 8 February 1807, helping to turn a near-defeat into a stalemate. Friant suffered a gunshot wound to his right side at Eylau.

Friant was named Comte de l'Empire on 5 October 1808.

In the 1809 campaign, Friant's Division fought with distinction at Teugen-Hausen (19 April), Abensberg (21 April), Eckmühl (22 April), and Ratisbon (23 April). At the Battle of Wagram on 6 July 1809, Friant was wounded in the shoulder by a shell fragment during the successful storming of the Square Tower at Markgrafneusiedl.

=== Russia, Germany, France ===
In the Russian campaign of 1812, Friant commanded the 2e Division of Davout's I Corps. In August 1812, after General Dorsenne's death, he was nominated as commander of the Grenadiers à Pied de la Vieille Garde. Friant remained at the head of his Division. He was wounded at the Battle of Smolensk (17 August) and severely wounded during the capture of Semenovskaya village at the Battle of Borodino (7 September 1812). Incapacitated and left behind at Gzhatsk, he was still there with his wounds unhealed when the retreating army returned to Gzhatsk at the end of October.

Friant returned to France to recover from his wounds in January 1813. He returned to the front in June 1813, commanding the Old Guard Division at the Battles of Dresden (26 August), Leipzig (16–19 October), and Hanau (30 October 1813).

In the 1814 campaign in France, Friant and his 1st Division of the Old Guard fought a successful defensive action against Gyulai's Austrians at Bar-sur-Aube on 24 January. Friant took part in Napoleon's surprise counter-offensive against Blücher's Army of Silesia, gaining victories at Montmirail (11 February), Château-Thierry (12 February), and Vauchamps (14 February 1814). Friant's Old Guard was the core and reserve of the Emperor's masse de manoeuvre. They were committed to battle in the bloody and indecisive clash at Craonne (7 March 1814), the reverse at Laon (9–10 March), the recapture of Reims (13 March), and the defeat at Arcis-sur-Aube, (20 March).

=== Waterloo and final years ===
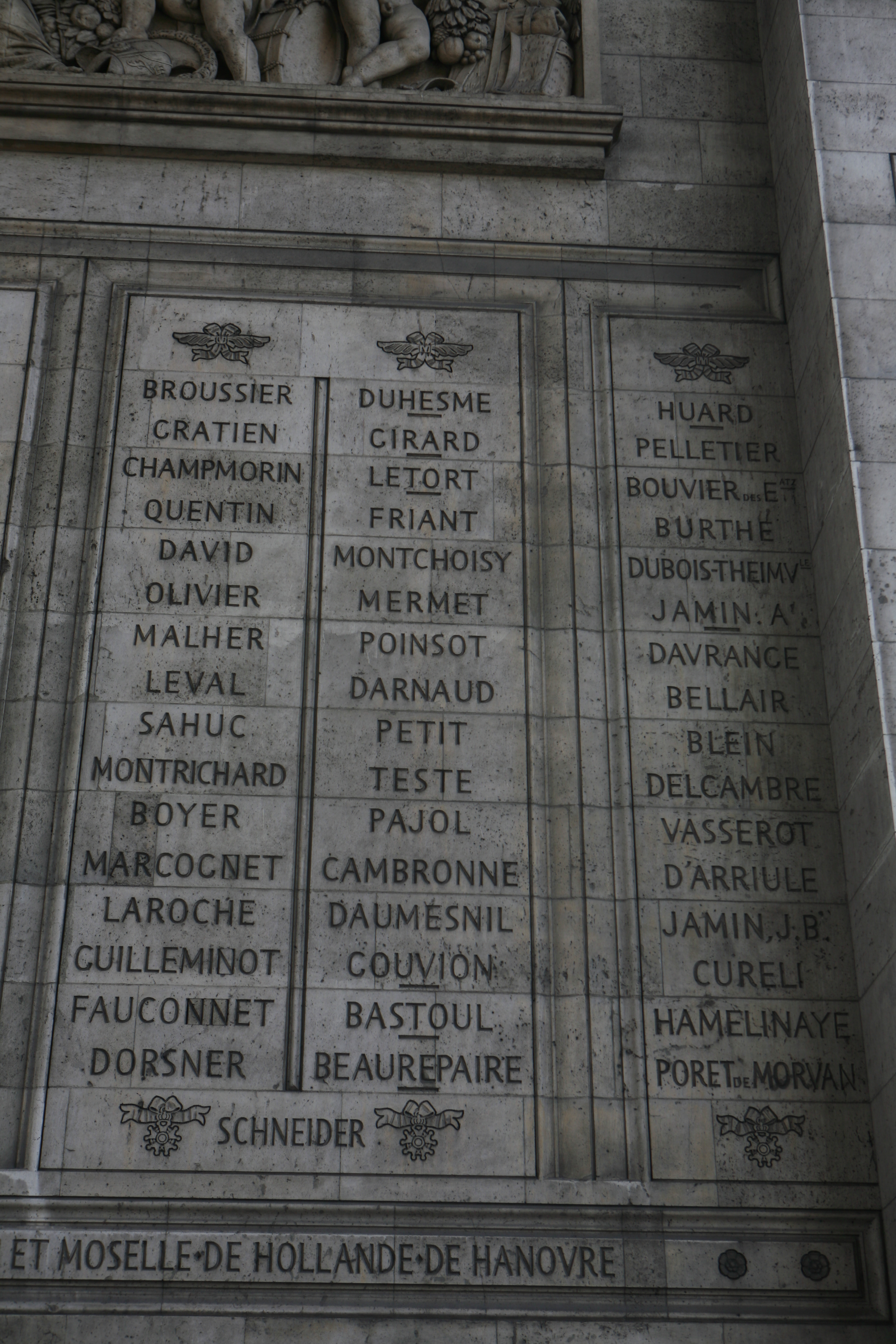
His name is on the Arc de Triomphe in Paris

During Napoleon's exile, Friant was retained as commander of the grenadiers à pied de France. In the campaign of the Hundred Days, he was Colonel-in-Chief of the Grenadiers à Pied de la Vieille Garde. His men made the final assault on Ligny as darkness fell on 16 June 1815. On 18 June, at Waterloo Friant led his Old Guard Grenadiers in the final, fateful attack on the Allied center, where he was wounded yet again.

Friant retired in September 1815. He died on 24 June 1829, aged 70.
