= Villodrigo =

Coordinates: 42°09′N 4°06′W

- municipality
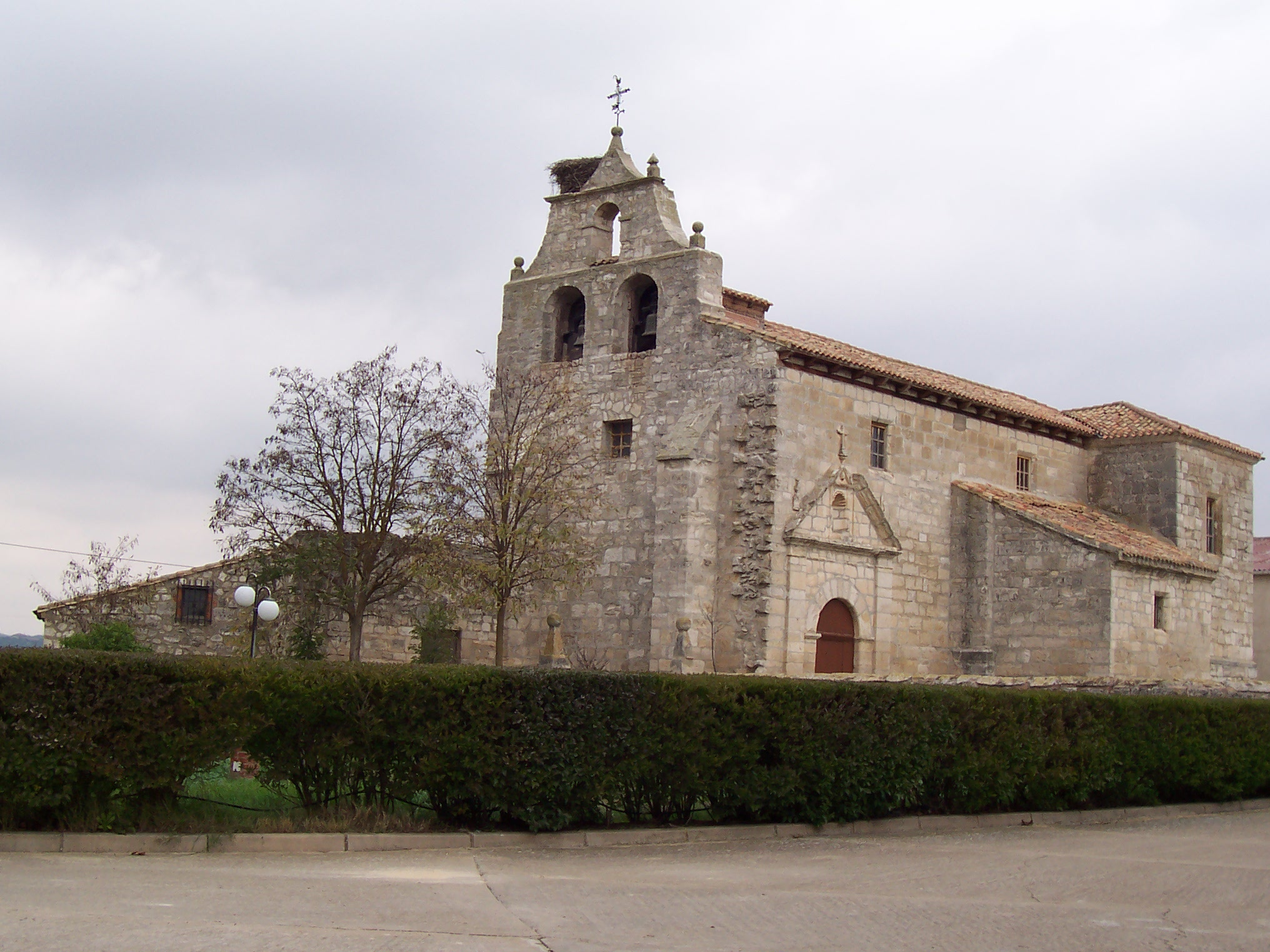

- Flag Coat of arms
- Interactive map of Villodrigo
- Country: Spain
- Autonomous community: Castile and León
- Province: Palencia
- Municipality: Villodrigo

Area
  - Total: 8 km^{2} (3.1 sq mi)

Population (2025-01-01)
  - Total: 96
  - Density: 12/km^{2} (31/sq mi)
- Time zone: UTC+1 (CET)
  - Summer (DST): UTC+2 (CEST)
- Website: Official website

Villodrigo is a municipality located in the province of Palencia, Castile and León, Spain. According to the 2022 census (INE), the municipality has a population of 100 inhabitants.
