= Battle of Laon =

1814 battle during the War of the Sixth Coalition

- Part of the Campaign of France of the Sixth Coalition
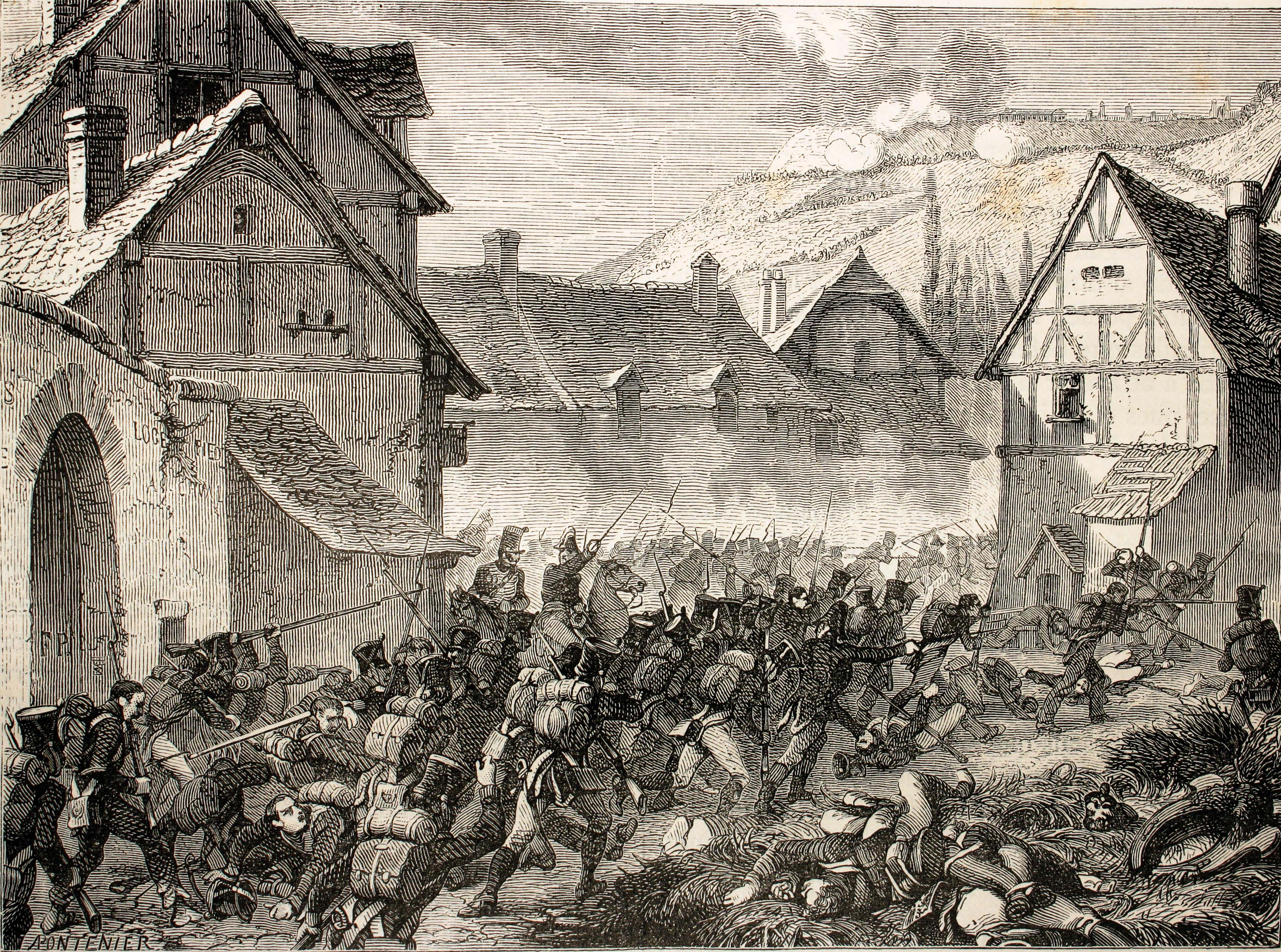
- Illustrations from the work: History of the Consulate and the Empire: continuation of the history of the French Revolution / by A. Thiers. - Barcelona: Montaner y Simón, 1879-
Date	9–10 March 1814 (Note: Limited fighting south of Laon began on 8 March.)
Location	Laon, France 49.5658°N 3.6206°E
Result	Coalition victory

Belligerents
(First French Empire) France	(Kingdom of Prussia) Prussia, (Russian Empire) Russia

Commanders and leaders
(First French Empire) Napoleon I (First French Empire) Auguste de Marmont (First French Empire) Michel Ney	(Kingdom of Prussia) Gebhard von Blücher (Kingdom of Prussia) August von Gneisenau (Kingdom of Prussia) Friedrich von Bülow (Russian Empire) Ferdinand von Wintzingerode

Strength
47,000–54,000 (Note: Estimates: • 37,000 directly under Napoleon, and 10,000 entrusted personally to Marmont.; • 50,000; • Napoleon had around 40,000 under his direct command, with another 14,000 under Marmont to the east, close enough to participate in battle, but not near enough to communicate with Napoleon.); 260 cannon (unknown number of cannon involved)	85,000–100,000 (Note: Estimates: • 85,000; • At the start of battle the Allies had around 100,000 men around Laon.); 480 cannon (150 cannon involved)

Casualties and losses
6,000–7,500 (Note: Estimates: • 6,000; • 6,500; • Up to 7,500: J. Rickard initially claims that Marmont's corps suffered 3,000–4,000 casualties, and then that the main force around 3,500 whilst Marmont "as many again".) 45 cannon and 120 caissons lost by Marmont	3,500–4,000 (Note: Estimates: • 3,500; • 4,000)
- Location within France

War of the Sixth Coalition:
Campaign in north-east France
current battle
Napoleon in command
Napoleon not in command

The Battle of Laon, fought on March 9–10, 1814, was a pivotal engagement during the waning months of the Napoleonic Wars. Blücher's Prusso-Russian force, occupying a tough defensive position at the town of Laon, repelled attacks by and successfully counterattacked French Emperor Napoleon and his subordinate corps commander, Marshal Marmont.

Marmont's actions were severely criticized by Napoleon and almost led to disaster. Meanwhile, Blücher, despite having approximately 50,000 more troops, acted cautiously; he was misled by false information suggesting 90,000 in the French ranks, and was himself sick and exhausted. Blücher was significantly superior to Napoleon in all three arms: infantry (75,000 vs. 40,000), cavalry (25,000 vs. 10,000), and artillery (480 pieces vs. 260). The 71-year-old Blücher was rendered hors de combat just as he planned to deliver the decisive blow to Napoleon on the morning of the 11th. On the 11th, he was replaced by his chief of staff, Gneisenau, who was deceived by Napoleon's frontal demonstrations against Laon. By the morning of the 12th, Gneisenau's cautious attacks on Ney's rearguard were repeatedly repulsed.

== Prelude ==
Following his costly success at the Battle of Craonne, Napoleon sought to exploit the disarray within General Blücher's Army of Silesia. Blücher had retreated to the fortified hilltop town of Laon, where he consolidated his forces, reinforced by Prussian and Russian contingents. Laon's strategic significance lay in its role as a key road junction, dominating the terrain and offering natural defensive advantages. Napoleon, aware of the urgent need to halt Blücher's advance toward Paris, assembled a smaller but determined French force, weakened by casualties and stretched supply lines. Despite his strategic acumen, Napoleon faced a formidable challenge: a well-prepared, numerically superior Allied force under an experienced and resolute commander.

The French approach to Laon was fraught with difficulties. Napoleon's troops were exhausted from continuous campaigning, and logistical support was inadequate. On March 8, heavy fog concealed French movements as Napoleon divided his forces, aiming to outflank the Allies and exploit weaknesses in their defensive line. However, coordination suffered due to poor visibility and the delayed arrival of Marshal Marmont's corps. Blücher, who had initially considered retreating, capitalized on these delays and ordered his troops to hold their positions. The Allies established a strong defensive line anchored by artillery on the heights of Laon, with villages such as Ardon and Semilly serving as forward bastions. Napoleon, undeterred by the odds, launched probing attacks, hoping to dislodge the Allied positions and force a decisive victory.

== Battlefield ==
The battlefield at Laon was strategically significant due to its natural advantages. The town sat atop a flat-topped hill rising over 100 meters above the surrounding countryside, providing excellent visibility and a commanding position for defensive operations. The area to the north was open and flat, ideal for large troop movements, while the southern approaches featured rough, wooded terrain, complicating offensive maneuvers. The villages of Ardon and Semilly, located at the base of the hill, served as strong defensive outposts for the Allied forces.

Blücher capitalized on Laon's defensive potential by deploying his forces along the ridge, supported by an extensive network of artillery. The key roads converging at Laon made it a vital logistical hub, and its natural elevation gave the Allies a decisive advantage in both defense and observation. Napoleon's forces, approaching from the south, faced significant obstacles in trying to dislodge the entrenched Prussian and Russian troops, as the terrain funneled their attacks into well-prepared kill zones.

== Preparations ==
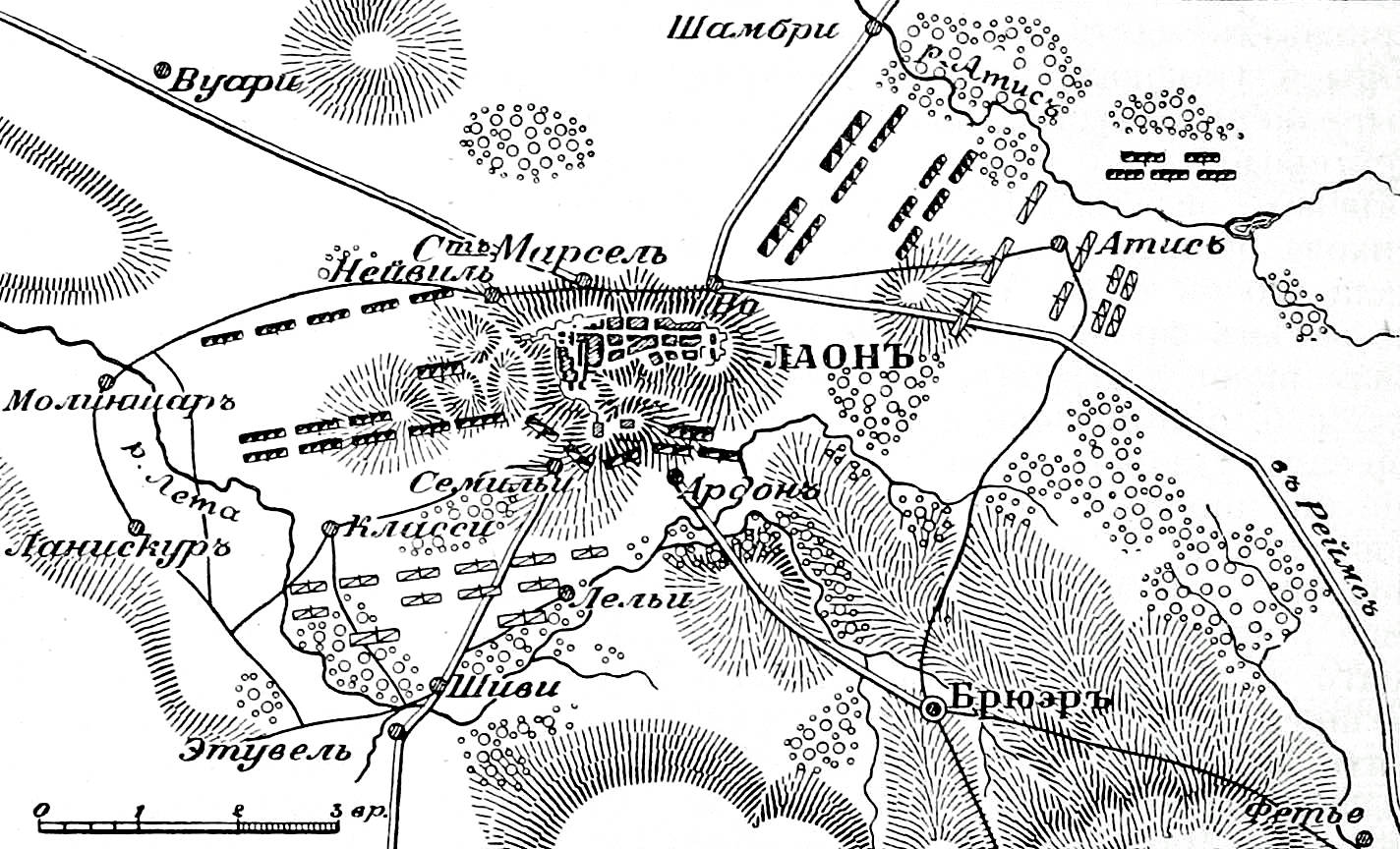
Map-scheme for the article "Laon". Sytin's Military Encyclopedia (St. Petersburg, 1911–1915)

Blücher now had about 90,000 troops and 176 guns. Friedrich Wilhelm Freiherr von Bülow's Prussian corps was assigned the defense of Laon itself. Blücher's western wing was covered by a Russian corps under Ferdinand von Wintzingerode while the eastern wing was defended by two Prussian corps under Generals Yorck and Kleist. Two Russian corps under Generals Langeron and Osten-Sacken stood in reserve. After Craonne, Napoleon had taken the bulk of his forces northeastwards towards Laon while detaching about 10,000 troops under Marmont to advance on Laon via the Berry-au-Bac road.

== Battle ==
Blücher was suffering from a fever. He, because of poor intelligence sources, was operating under the impression that the French had 90,000 troops and was generally reluctant to have his troops launch any attacks.

The Battle of Laon began on the morning of March 9, 1814, with Napoleon Bonaparte's forces advancing to confront the Army of Silesia, commanded by Blücher. Following a series of defeats and withdrawals, Blücher had taken up a strong defensive position at Laon, a hilltop town with a commanding view of the surrounding landscape. The Allied army, which consisted primarily of Prussian and Russian forces, numbered about 100,000 troops (in total), significantly outnumbering Napoleon's smaller force of approximately 50,000 men in total numbers. Napoleon, despite the challenges posed by his weakened forces, was determined to halt Blücher's progress toward Paris. He sought to use his tactical brilliance to exploit any weakness in the enemy's lines and strike decisively.

The French army, fatigued from previous engagements, struggled with supply and coordination issues, and this hampered Napoleon's ability to deploy his forces efficiently. The weather, too, played a role, with thick fog and difficult terrain slowing down the movement of the French troops. Napoleon's strategy relied on splitting his forces, with the aim of outflanking the Allies and catching them off guard. Marshal Marmont's 6th Corps was positioned on the right flank and tasked with engaging the enemy at Athies, while the rest of Napoleon's army advanced toward the southern approaches of Laon. However, delays in Marmont's arrival and the logistical difficulties caused confusion in the French plans, which Blücher was quick to exploit.

Blücher, sensing an opportunity, ordered his forces to prepare for an attack and used the fog to his advantage. He launched a surprise counteroffensive against Marmont's isolated corps during the night of March 9. The French forces, unprepared for such an assault, were pushed back in disarray. The counterattack was a success, forcing Marmont's corps into a hasty retreat and exposing a gap in the French lines. This unexpected setback for Napoleon disrupted his overall plan and gave Blücher's forces a significant advantage. The night attack was crucial in the outcome of the battle, as it shattered the cohesion of the French forces and shifted the momentum toward the Allies. Marmont narrowly escaped encirclement and total destruction thanks to the intervention of Colonel Fabvier and the Old Guard escort, both of whom secured the retreat routes from enemy units.

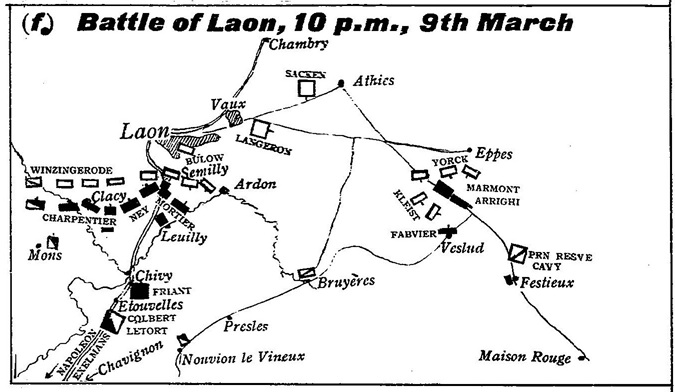
Battle of Laon, 10 pm, 9 March 1814 – The Prussians rout Marmont.

The next morning, March 10, Napoleon attempted to regroup his forces and launch a fresh assault on the Allied positions. The French commander aimed to push through the southern and eastern sections of Laon, targeting the strong defensive positions that had been fortified with artillery. Despite some initial successes in breaking through the Allied skirmishers, the French were met with heavy resistance. The Allied artillery, positioned on the high ground, unleashed devastating fire on the French advancing troops, causing significant casualties. Napoleon's forces struggled to make headway against the entrenched defensive lines, which were well-supported by the Prussian and Russian infantry.

As the day wore on, Napoleon realized that the battle was not progressing in his favor. His forces were suffering heavy losses, and the French attempts to outflank the Allied positions were repeatedly thwarted by Blücher's resolute defense. The French could not break the Allied lines, and the casualties continued to mount. Napoleon's own tactical brilliance was not enough to overcome the disadvantages of being outnumbered, fatigued, and unable to fully coordinate his forces due to the delays and logistical challenges. Meanwhile, Blücher's army, although also tired, was bolstered by its strong defensive position and superior numbers, allowing the Allies to absorb the French assaults and maintain their ground.

By the evening of March 10, it became clear that further fighting would only lead to more French casualties without a realistic chance of victory. Napoleon, understanding that the French were unlikely to achieve a breakthrough, ordered a withdrawal under the cover of darkness. The retreat was organized in a relatively orderly fashion, but the French had suffered significant losses. The total number of French casualties in the battle was estimated as at least 6,000 men, including killed, wounded, and captured. On the Allied side, casualties numbered at least 3,500, but they retained their position on the field and were able to continue their advance toward Paris.

== Aftermath ==
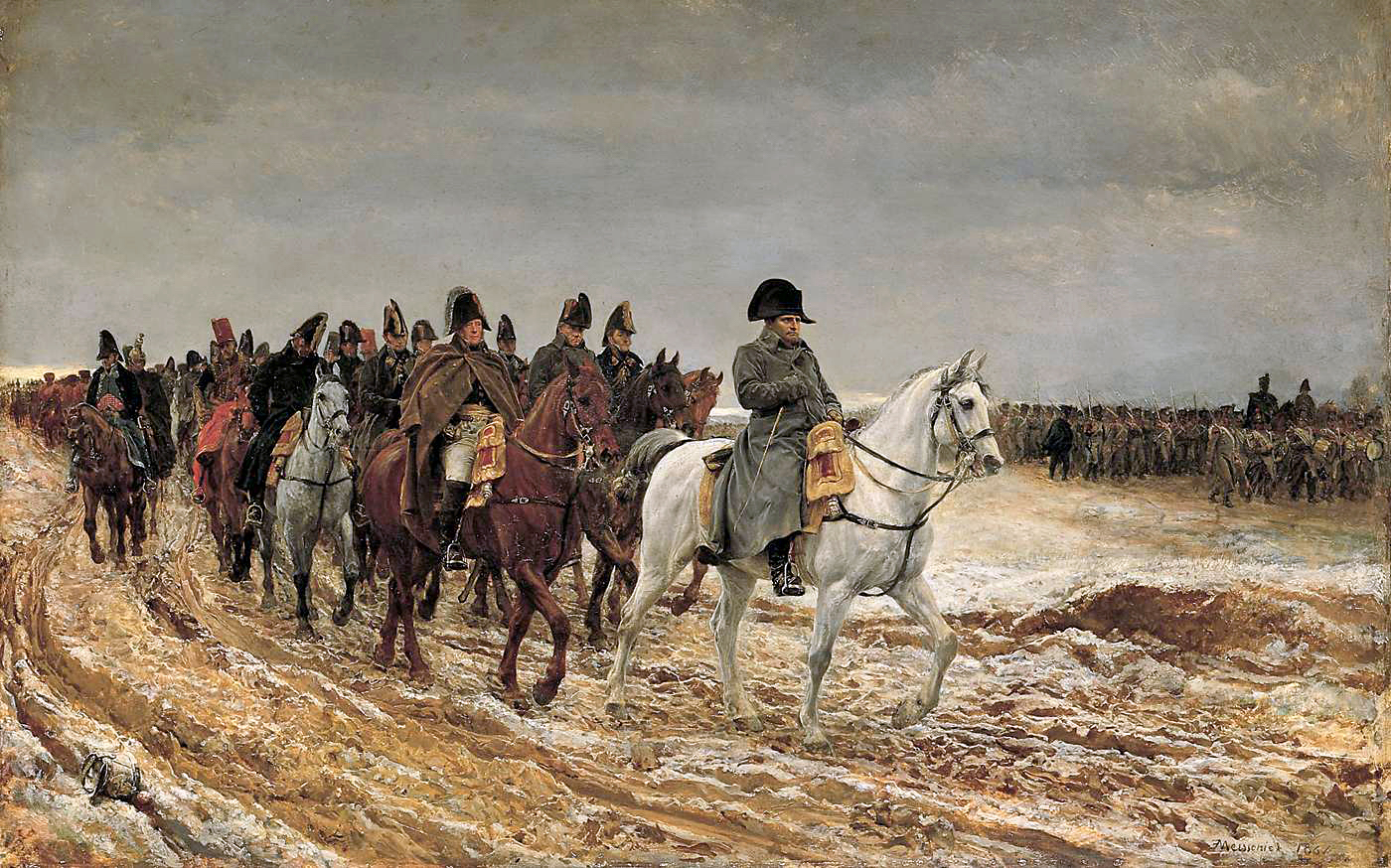
Napoleon and his staff returning from Soissons after the battle.

This setback did not by itself spell the end for Napoleon. Just a few days later, the French crushed an isolated enemy corps at Reims. Blücher's Army of Silesia remained inactive for a week after the victory. Nevertheless, the Allied stand had prevented Napoleon from driving them further north. The Allies were still in a position to advance on and take Paris, which they did at the end of March.

== Notes ==
Preceded by Battle of Bar-sur-Aube	Napoleonic Wars; Battle of Laon	Succeeded by Battle of Reims (1814)
