= Six Days' Campaign =

1814 campaign during the War of the Sixth Coalition

- Part of the 1814 campaign in north-east France
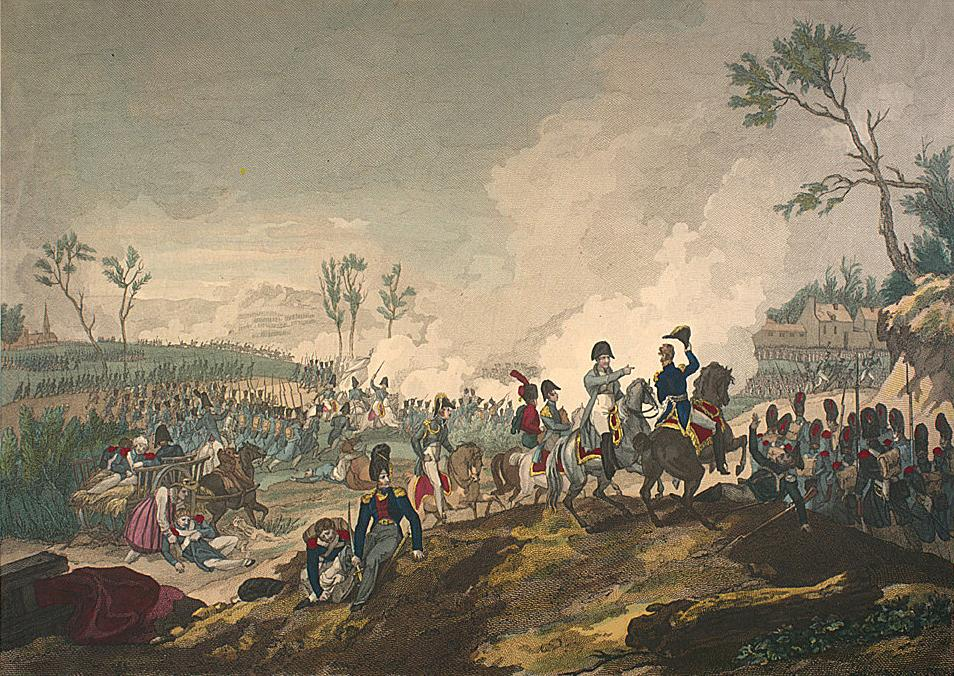
- Lithograph of the Battle of Montmirail
Date	10–15 February 1814
Location	Northeastern France
Result	French victory (see Analysis)

Belligerents
France	Prussia; Russia

Commanders and leaders
(First French Empire) Napoleon I	(Kingdom of Prussia) Gebhard von Blücher

Strength
30,000 men	50,000–56,000 men

Casualties and losses
3,400 men	17,750 men (in battle); 28,500 (in total); 36 guns

The Six Days' Campaign (10–15 February 1814) was a final series of victories by the forces of Napoleon I of France as the Sixth Coalition closed in on Paris. As was said by his contemporary enemy, the Austrian general Johann von Nostitz-Rieneck, this campaign demonstrated Napoleon's tactical mastery "to the highest degree." The campaign occurred during the campaign in north-east France.

When the Napoleonic army was preparing to strike at Blücher's Russo-Prussian Army of Silesia, the latter's headquarters underestimated this threat. The Army of Silesia was stretched out on the march towards Paris. Its Russian corps commander Osten-Sacken had already made contact with the advanced Napoleon's units on 8 February, but did not report to Blücher, while its chief of staff Gneisenau made another blunder, namely, he believed that Napoleon's full movement from Villenauxe to Sézanne was only a reconnaissance after the leading French cavalrymen, who had come into view, retreated. A Russian officer arrived at Blücher's headquarters late on the 9th and reported to him and the staff that the army was under threat from the south, while on the night of the 10th intelligence discovered Napoleon himself already at Sézanne. Early on the 10th Napoleon attacked the central corps of the Army of Silesia, which was at Champaubert. Thus the Six Days Campaign began.

It was fought from 10 February to 15 February during which time Napoleon in the course of his lightning offensive, whilst his opponent did not have time to react, inflicted four defeats on the Army of Silesia by engaging its individual parts sequentially in the Battle of Champaubert, where he routed the entire corps and wedged into the central section of the enemy army, the Battle of Montmirail and the Battle of Château-Thierry, where he defeated the advanced forces and forced them to escape north-east beyond the Marne, and the Battle of Vauchamps, where he decisively pushed back the force under Blücher himself. With the exception of Champaubert, these battles took place with Napoleon's tactical inferiority in numbers; moreover, his army consisted largely of inexperienced soldiers. These shortcomings forced Napoleon to make extensive use of the Imperial Guard during the Six Days. Napoleon's 30,000-man army, having suffered the loss of 3,400 men, managed to inflict 17,750 casualties on Blücher's force of 50,000–56,000.

The advance of the Army of Bohemia under Prince Schwarzenberg toward Paris compelled Napoleon to abandon his pursuit of Blücher's army, which, though badly beaten and dispersed, was soon replenished by the arrival of reinforcements. Five days after the defeat at Vauchamps, the Army of Silesia was back on the offensive.

== Strategic situation ==
By the start of 1814 the Sixth Coalition had defeated the French both in Germany (see German Campaign of 1813 ) and in Spain (see Peninsular War § End of the war in Spain), and were poised to invade France from the north-east and south-west.

On the north-eastern front three Coalition armies were preparing to invade France, however by the time that Six Days' Campaign ended only two armies had crossed the frontier into France:

- The Army of Bohemia or the Grand Army, with 200,000–210,000 Austrian, Russian, Bavarian, and Wurttemberg soldiers under Prince Schwarzenberg, passed through Swiss territory (violating the cantons' neutrality) and crossed the Rhine between Basel and Schafhausen on 20 December 1813.
- The Army of Silesia, with 50,000–56,000 Prussians and Russians under Prince Blücher, crossed the Rhine between Rastadt and Koblenz on 1 January 1814.

At the same time Wellington invaded France over the Pyrenees. Leaving Marshals Soult and Suchet to defend south-west France, Napoleon commanded the French resistance in north-east France.

Napoleon had about 200,000 men in all, of whom upwards of 100,000 were held by the Duke of Wellington on the Spanish frontier (see Invasion of south-west France), and 20,000 more were required to watch the debouches from the Alps. Hence less than 80,000 remained available for the east and north-eastern frontier. If, however, he was weak in numbers, he was now operating in a friendly country, able to find food almost everywhere and had easy lines of communication.

== Prelude ==
The fighting in north-east France was indecisive during January and the first week of February. During the Battle of Brienne (29 January 1814) Napoleon surprised Blücher at his headquarters and nearly captured him. Having learnt that Napoleon was at hand Blücher fell back a few miles to the east the next morning to a strong position covering the exits from the Bar-sur-Aube defile. There he was joined by the Austrian advance guard and together they decided to accept battle—indeed they had no alternative, as the roads in rear were so choked with traffic that retreat was out of the question. At about noon on 2 February Napoleon attacked them opening the Battle of La Rothière. The weather was terrible, and the ground so heavy that the French guns, the mainstay of Napoleon's whole system of warfare, were useless and in the drifts of snow which at intervals swept across the field, the columns lost their direction and many were severely handled by the Cossacks. Although the French inflicted more damage than they received, Napoleon retired to Lesmont, and from there to Troyes, Marshal Marmont being left to observe the enemy.

Owing to the state of the roads, or perhaps to the extraordinary lethargy which always characterized Schwarzenberg's headquarters, no pursuit was attempted. But on 4 February Blücher, chafing at this inaction, obtained the permission of his own sovereign, King Frederick Wilhelm III, to transfer his line of operations to the valley of the Marne; Pahlen's corps of Cossacks were assigned to him to cover his left and maintain communication with the Austrians.

Believing himself secure behind this screen, Blücher advanced from Vitry along the roads leading down the valley of the Marne, with his columns widely separated for convenience of subsistence and shelter the latter being almost essential in the terrible weather prevailing. Blücher himself on the night of 7/8 February was at Sézanne, on the exposed flank so as to be nearer to his sources of intelligence, and the rest of his army were distributed in four small corps at or near Épernay, Montmirail and Étoges; reinforcements also were on their way to join him and were then about Vitry.

In the night Blücher's headquarters were again surprised, and Blücher learnt that Napoleon himself with his main body was in full march to fall on his scattered detachments. At the same time he heard that Pahlen's Cossacks had been withdrawn forty-eight hours previously, thus completely exposing his flank. He himself retreated towards Étoges endeavouring to rally his scattered detachments.

== Campaign ==
Napoleon was too quick for Blücher: he decimated Lieutenant General Olsufiev's Russian IX Corps at the Battle of Champaubert (10 February). There were 4,000 Russian casualties and Russian General Zakhar Dmitrievich Olsufiev taken prisoner, to approximately 200 French casualties.

This placed the French army between Blücher's vanguard and his main body. Napoleon turned his attention to the vanguard and defeated Osten-Sacken and Yorck at Montmirail on 11 February; There were 4,000 Coalition casualties, to 2,000 French casualties. Napoleon attacked and defeated them again the next day at the Battle of Château-Thierry. There were 1,250 Prussian, 1,500 Russian casualties and nine cannons lost, to approximately 600 French casualties.

Napoleon then turned on the main body of the Army of Silesia and on 14 February defeated Blücher in the Battle of Vauchamps near Étoges, pursuing the latter towards Vertus. There were 7,000 Prussian casualties and 16 cannons lost, to approximately 600 French casualties.

These disasters compelled the retreat of the whole Silesian army, and Napoleon, leaving detachments with Marshals Mortier and Marmont to deal with them, hurried back to Troyes.

== Analysis ==
Ralph Ashby wrote in Napoleon Against Great Odds (2010):

Blücher’s Army of Silesia had been very roughly handled between February 10 and 14. The ebullient Prussian Field Marshal was temporarily chastened. Napoleon had beaten a larger force with a smaller one and had suffered only a fraction of the casualties he inflicted on the Russo-Prussian forces. Even given the massive Allied superiority in numbers, they had taken losses proportionately greater than the French. The Army of Silesia had lost about a third of its strength, and the remainder was whipped and demoralized. To add to Allied woes, French partisan warfare was beginning to take shape...

David Zabecki wrote in Germany at War (2014):

Later commentators noted that in this campaign Napoleon achieved unexpected and extraordinary results, including the elimination of approximately 20,000 enemy troops, which nearly halved the forces he then faced. Napoleon's troops had been greatly outnumbered, and he therefore fought by means of careful tactical manoeuvring, rather than using the sort of brute force characteristic of earlier French victories.

But the campaign rallied the Allies and helped end their internal bickering.

Michael Leggiere in Blücher: Scourge of Napoleon (2014) quotes Johann von Nostitz that the campaign displayed Napoleon's "talents as a field commander to the highest degree in defeating five enemy corps in sequence", but in failing to totally destroy Blücher's army and driving the remnants back into Germany, Napoleon missed his only opportunity of forcing the Coalition Powers to agree to anything other than peace on their terms.

== Aftermath ==
Following his successful campaign against Blücher, Napoleon hurried south to face Schwarzenberg. Although his forces outnumbered Napoleon's by six to one, Schwarzenberg ordered a retreat upon hearing of Napoleon's approach, and left a rearguard under the Prince of Württemberg to fight the French at Montereau.

On 22 February, a council of war was held near Troyes by Coalition leaders. Frightened by his recent streak of victories, they offered Napoleon an armistice whose terms would allow him to keep his throne in exchange for the restoration of the French borders of 1791. Napoleon refused unless they agreed to the terms of the 1813 Frankfurt proposals.

On 28 February, Coalition forces resumed their advance. Napoleon inflicted further defeats on both Schwarzenberg's and Blücher's armies. Thus after six weeks fighting the Coalition armies had hardly gained any ground. However, after the Battle of Arcis-sur-Aube on 20 March, where the Austrians outnumbered his dwindling army 80,000 to 28,000, Napoleon realised that he could no longer continue with his current strategy of defeating the Coalition armies in detail and decided to change his tactics. He had two options: he could fall back on Paris and hope that the Coalition members would come to terms, as capturing Paris with a French army under his command would be difficult and time-consuming; or he could copy the Russians and leave Paris to his enemies (as they had left Moscow to him two years earlier). He decided to move eastward to Saint-Dizier, rally what garrisons he could find, and raise the whole country against the invaders and attack their lines of communications.

A letter containing an outline of his plan of action was captured by his enemies. The Coalition commanders held a council of war at Pougy on the 23 March and initially decided to follow Napoleon, but the next day Tsar Alexander I of Russia and King Frederick of Prussia along with their advisers reconsidered, and realising the weakness of their opponent, decided to march to Paris (then an open city), and let Napoleon do his worst to their lines of communications.

The Coalition armies marched straight for the capital. Marmont and Mortier with what troops they could rally took up a position on Montmartre heights to oppose them. The Battle of Paris ended when the French commanders, seeing further resistance to be hopeless, surrendered the city on 31 March, just as Napoleon, with the wreck of the Guards and a mere handful of other detachments, was hurrying across the rear of the Austrians towards Fontainebleau to join them.

Napoleon was forced to announce his unconditional abdication and sign the Treaty of Fontainebleau. Napoleon was sent into exile on the island of Elba and Louis XVIII became king. The Treaty of Paris, signed by representatives of the French monarchy and the Coalition powers, formally ended the War of the Sixth Coalition on 30 May 1814.
