= Battle of La Rothière =

1814 battle during the War of the Sixth Coalition

- Part of the Campaign of France of the Sixth Coalition
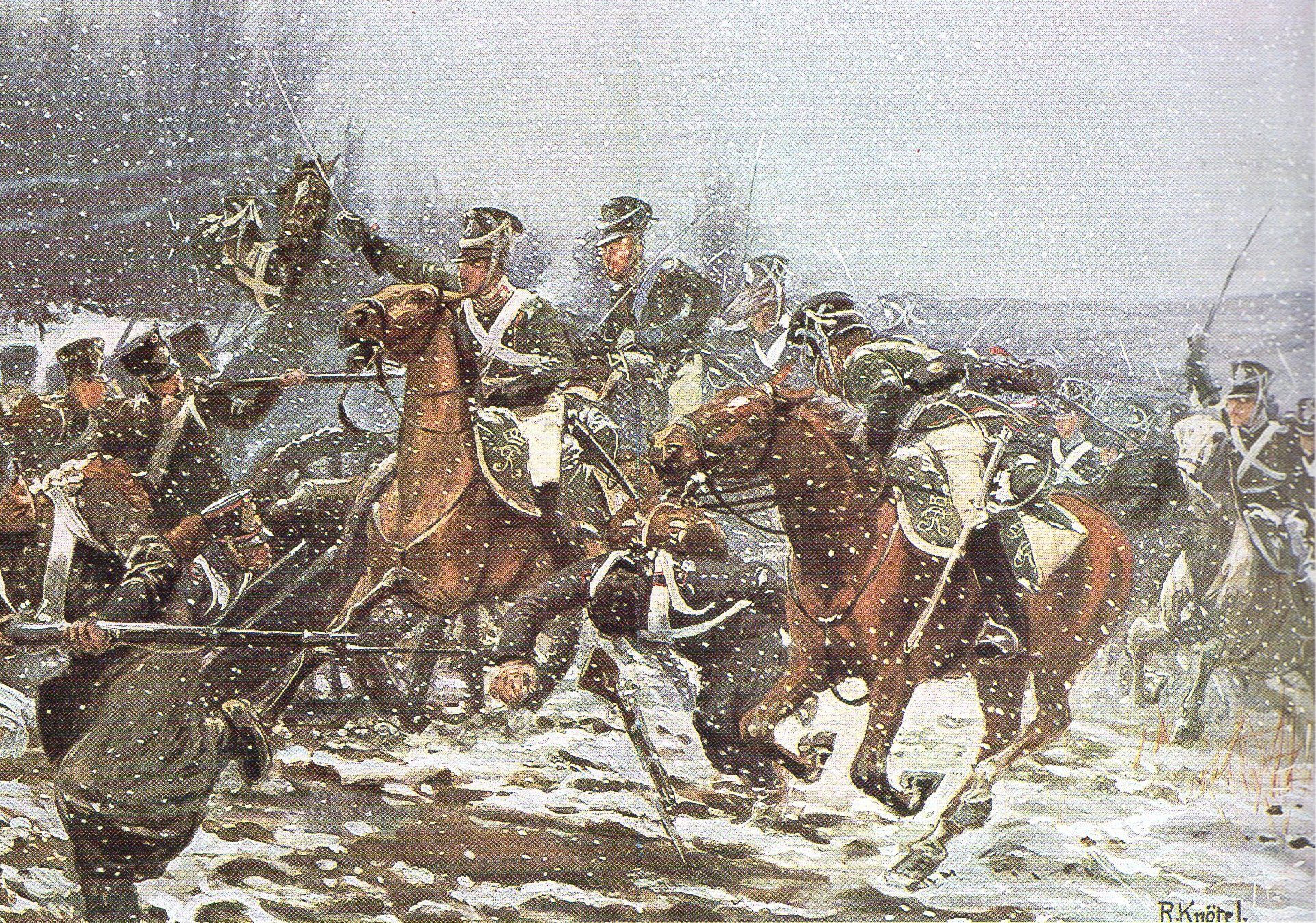
- Württemberg dragoons charging French infantry
Date	1 February 1814
Location	La Rothière, French Empire 48.3458°N 4.5583°E
Result	Coalition victory

Belligerents
(Austrian Empire) Austria; (Kingdom of Bavaria) Bavaria; (Kingdom of Prussia) Prussia; (Russian Empire) Russia; (Kingdom of Württemberg) Württemberg	(First French Empire) France

Commanders and leaders
(Kingdom of Prussia) Gebhard Blücher	(First French Empire) Napoleon Bonaparte

Strength
78,000–123,000; 200 guns	36,140–50,460; 128 guns

Casualties and losses
6,000–7,000	5,600–6,000, 50–73 guns
- Location within France

War of the Sixth Coalition:
Campaign in north-east France
current battle
Napoleon in command
Napoleon not in command

The Battle of La Rothière (1 February 1814) saw the Coalition forces of the Austrian Empire, Russian Empire, Kingdom of Prussia, Kingdom of Bavaria, and Kingdom of Württemberg attack a French army led by Emperor Napoleon. The main Coalition army was under the command of Field Marshal Karl Philipp, Prince of Schwarzenberg but Gebhard Leberecht von Blücher was given tactical control of the fighting. The Allies defeated the outnumbered and overextended French during a snowfall.

After clashing with Blücher's forces in the Battle of Brienne on 29 January, Napoleon lingered in the area too long. When the Coalition army attacked, Napoleon's troops were poorly positioned to defend themselves and it was too late to avoid battle. Nevertheless, the French army fought hard and managed to hold its ground until it could retreat under cover of darkness.

== Background ==
=== Strategic situation ===
After being disastrously defeated by the Coalition armies at the Battle of Leipzig, Napoleon with 60,000–70,000 French soldiers retreated across the Rhine River in November 1813. Napoleon garrisoned the various fortresses in Germany with 100,000 soldiers and these would be lost to him in the 1814 campaign. Furthermore, former French allies like Bavaria and other German states switched sides and joined the Coalition. Napoleon spread out his scanty forces in a thin line along the Rhine. Meanwhile, the French emperor tried to organize a new army to face the Coalition hosts. To oppose the numerically superior allies, Napoleon could deploy only 129,106 men on 1 December 1813.

In late 1813, three Coalition armies were poised to invade France. The Army of Bohemia under Field Marshal Karl Philipp, Prince of Schwarzenberg crossed the upper Rhine near Basel in Switzerland on 20 December 1813. The Army of Silesia under Blücher crossed the middle Rhine on 1 January 1814. General Ferdinand von Wintzingerode crossed the lower Rhine on 6 January. On 1 January 1814, the Army of Bohemia numbered 156,868 men and the Army of Silesia counted 77,100 soldiers. From the North Army, Wintzingerode directed 36,000 Russians and General Friedrich Wilhelm Freiherr von Bülow controlled 30,000 Prussians.

=== Operations ===
At first, the French retreated rapidly and offered little resistance to the Allied invasion. The First Battle of Bar-sur-Aube on 24 January 1814 was the first significant clash. In this battle, Marshal Édouard Mortier, Duke of Treviso with 20,000 men fought with part of the Army of Bohemia before retreating to Troyes. Napoleon reached the theater of action on 26 January and assumed command of the 41,303 available soldiers. His intention was to attack Blücher's army while it was separated from a Prussian corps led by Ludwig Yorck von Wartenburg. The result was the Battle of Brienne on 29 January 1814. During the battle, Blücher was nearly captured by a sudden rush of French troops. Learning that the French emperor in person was at hand, Blücher accordingly fell back the next morning to a strong position covering the exits from the Bar-sur-Aube defile.

Historian David G. Chandler regarded the Battle of Brienne as inconclusive. As Francis Loraine Petre noted, Napoleon failed to destroy Blücher's army before Schwarzenberg's army could come to its assistance. On 30 January, Blücher took up a position at Trannes, south of Brienne, and stayed there the following day. Napoleon remained fixed in position on 30 and 31 January. The French emperor mistakenly concluded that the Allies were intent on keeping him stationary at Brienne, while their main effort was directed at Troyes. On the morning of 1 February, Napoleon directed Marshal Michel Ney to march from Brienne to Troyes. However, at noon, movements by Blücher indicated that an Allied attack might be coming.

On 29 January, Schwarzenberg held a council of war at which it was decided that Feldzeugmeister (FZM) Hieronymus von Colloredo-Mansfeld's 1st Corps should move from Bar-sur-Seine to Vendœuvres in order to block any move by Mortier to advance east from Troyes. This move would free FZM Ignaz Gyulai's 3rd Corps to join Crown Prince William of Württemberg's 4th Corps at Bar-sur-Aube. General Karl Philipp von Wrede's 5th Corps and General Peter Wittgenstein's 6th Corps at Joinville were to attack Wassy. However, Marshal Auguste de Marmont's corps left Wassy and marched to Morvilliers so as to join Napoleon. Yorck occupied Saint-Dizier and marched west toward Vitry-le-François. The 4th Corps moved to the right rear of Blücher's position at Trannes. (Note: The Coalition 2nd Corps had been detached to support FML Ferdinand Bubna's operations from Switzerland (Petre, p. 21n).)

On 31 January, the Allies determined to attack Napoleon the following day. Schwarzenberg tasked Blücher to assume tactical control of the battle. Blücher was given authority over the 3rd Corps and 4th Corps in addition to his own commands of General-Leutnant (GL) Fabian Gottlieb von der Osten-Sacken and GL Zakhar Dmitrievich Olsufiev. Though two cuirassier divisions and two grenadier divisions of Russians from General Michael Andreas Barclay de Tolly's Reserve Corps were ordered to move to Trannes, Blücher was not given control over them. The 6th Corps was directed to follow Yorck toward Saint-Dizier. The 5th Corps was instructed to follow the 6th Corps, but Wrede offered to march west toward Brienne; Schwarzenberg approved the move. If Yorck and Wittgenstein had been ordered to cut off Napoleon's retreat route, the emperor's army might have been destroyed. Petre proposed that this was not done because the Austrian government was not ready to crush Napoleon completely. Frederic N. Maude suggested that the Allies had no choice but to fight because the roads in the rear were so choked with traffic that retreat was out of the question.

== Order of battle ==
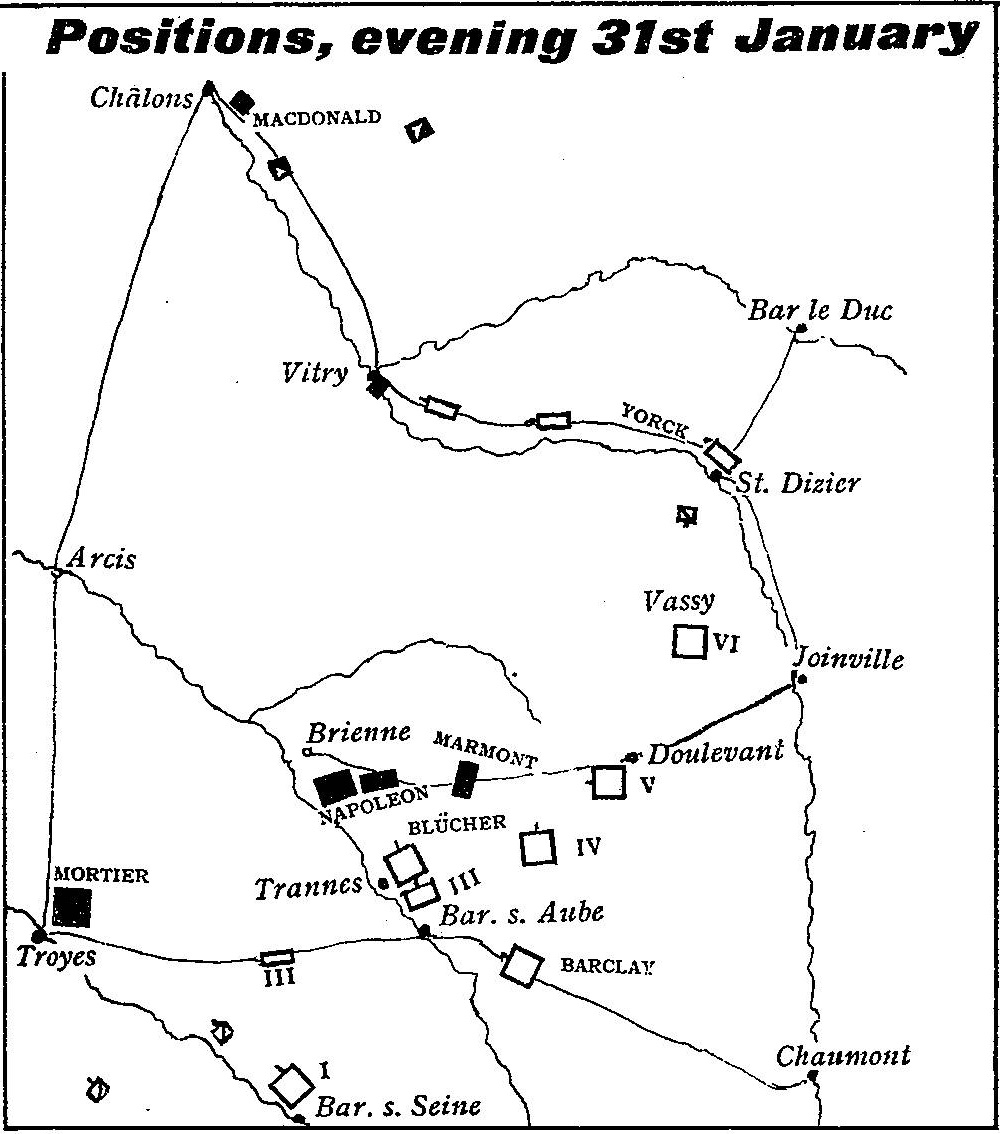
Map shows the positions of the armies on 31 January 1814 prior to the Battle of La Rothière.

Petre credited General of Division (GD) Étienne Maurice Gérard with 8,300 soldiers, Marshal Marshal Claude Perrin Victor with 17,300 troops, Marmont with 8,200 men, and Marshal Michel Ney with 11,300 soldiers. The French army numbered 45,100 men with 128 guns. Petre stated that Blücher had direct control over Sacken's 27,000 troops, Gyulai's (3rd Corps) 12,000 men, and Württemberg's (4th Corps) 14,000 soldiers, for a total of 53,000 men. However, Wrede's 5th Corps counted 26,000 soldiers and Barclay's Reserve had 34,000 troops. From the Reserves, only 6,000–7,000 men were engaged in the battle. Therefore, the Allies engaged 85,000 troops and 200 guns in the battle. Note that Gyulai's numbers did not include one division left at Vendœuvres. This was Gyulai's light division. (Note: Gyulai's light division was commanded by Louis Charles Folliot de Crenneville (Nafziger, p. 586). An Austrian corps typically consisted of one light division and two line divisions. The light division included both infantry and light cavalry, with attached artillery (Rothenberg, p. 233).)

Digby Smith asserted that the French army counted about 45,000 men in 57 battalions and 62 squadrons, supported by 128 artillery pieces. Sacken's army corps consisted of GL Aleksei Scherbatov's Russian 6th Corps, Generalmajor (GM) Johann von Lieven's Russian 11th Corps, Olsufiev's 9th Russian Corps, GL Ilarion Vasilshikov's Russian Cavalry Corps, GM Akim Karkov's Cossack Corps, and GM Prince Biron of Courland's Prussian cavalry brigade. Smith's order of battle also listed the Coalition 3rd, 4th, and 5th Corps, but not Barclay's Reserves. Smith stated that the Allies had 120,000 men available, but that only 80,000 came into action. Gaston Bodart asserted that the Coalition had 123,000 soldiers available against 41,000 French. George Nafziger stated that 78,000 Allies were engaged in fighting out of 118,000 men available. Nafziger quoted two authors who credited the French with 36,140 (Sporschil) and 50,460 (Damitz) men but admitted that the actual figure was probably between the two. (Note: Confusingly, there is a Coalition 6th Corps under Wittgenstein and a completely different 6th Russian Corps under Scherbatov. The Army of Bohemia was organized into the 1st through 6th Coalition Corps, plus two independent light divisions and a Reserve. The Russian army corps of the Army of Silesia controlled two or more infantry corps. Note that Olsufiev's 9th Corps belonged to a different army corps and was only temporarily attached to Sacken's command (Nafziger, pp. 546–564).)

== Battle ==
=== Initial moves ===
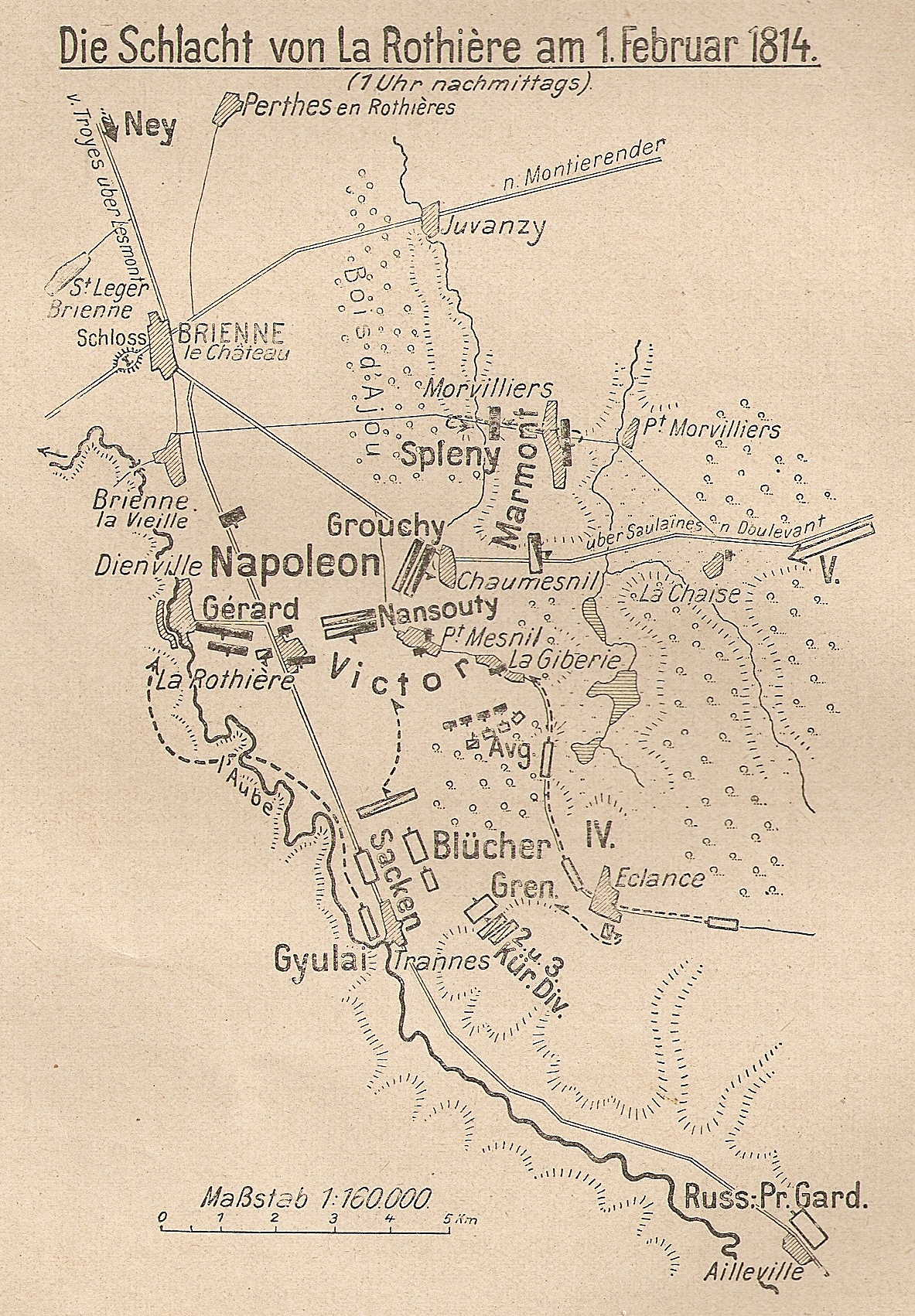
Map of the Battle of La Rothière

As soon as it was obvious that the Allies were about to attack him, Napoleon recalled Ney's Imperial Guard infantry divisions. Two of these divisions were between Brienne and Lesmont, while GD Henri Rottembourg's Guard division was at Brienne-la-Vieille, which was nearer. Gérard's 8,000 troops held Dienville on the right wing with Cyrille Picquet's cavalry brigade to its left. GD Étienne Pierre Sylvestre Ricard division from Marmont's VI Corps was also under Gérard's command. GD Guillaume Philibert Duhesme's division of Victor's II Corps had one brigade holding La Rothière and another brigade behind it. Victor deployed two battalions each in Petit-Mesnil and Chaumesnil, one battalion in the Beaulieu Wood and four battalions on the hill behind it, and the remainder of his infantry in the hamlet of La Giberie. To the left of Duhesme stood GD Étienne Champion de Nansouty's three Guard cavalry divisions: GD Pierre David de Colbert-Chabanais, GD Charles Lefebvre-Desnouettes, and GD Claude-Étienne Guyot.

GD Emmanuel de Grouchy had command over Édouard Milhaud's V Cavalry Corps. The corps had the three divisions of GD Hippolyte Piré, GD André Briche, and GD Samuel-François Lhéritier. Grouchy was posted between Petit-Mesnil and Chaumesnil. On the left wing, Marmont had GD Joseph Lagrange's division in Morvilliers with one battalion well to the east at La Chaise supported by GD Jean-Pierre Doumerc's I Cavalry Corps. Napoleon had too few soldiers to defend his 7 mi (11.3 km) front so that he held the villages with infantry and the gaps between villages with cavalry. Because the weather was terrible and the ground so heavy, Napoleon's artillery, the mainstay of his whole system of warfare, was nearly useless. In the snow which, at intervals, swept across the field, many columns lost their direction.

Sacken's Russian army corps began its advance from Trannes at noon. Sacken's left column was formed by the 8,000 troops of the 11th Corps. His right column was made up of 8,000 men from the 6th Corps. These were followed by Olsufiev's 9th Corps (5,000 men) and Vasilshikov's Cavalry Corps. To Sacken's left, Gyulai's Austrians advanced toward Dienville in battalion masses. To Sacken's right, the Crown Prince's 4th Corps advanced from Éclance toward the Beaulieu Wood and La Giberie. GM Biron's Prussian cavalry brigade and Karpov's Cossacks covered the gap between Sacken and the Crown Prince. Wrede's Austro-Bavarian 5th Corps began moving against Morvilliers on the extreme right flank.

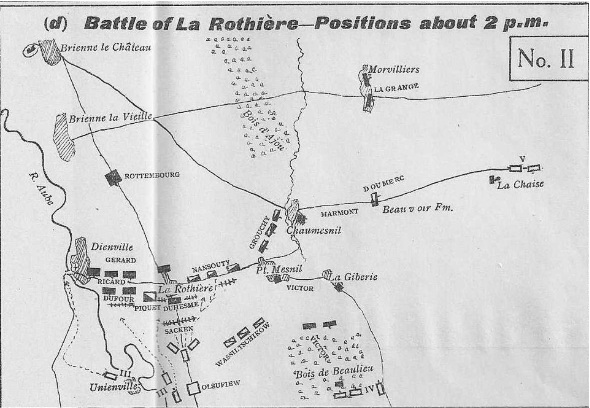
Battle of La Rothière 2pm, 1 Feb 1814 from Petre

Because the roads were in terrible shape, Sacken was compelled to double team half his 72 artillery pieces and leave the rest in the rear. Even so, the 36 guns were well-served and repulsed Nansouty's first cavalry charge. When Sacken's infantry began to deploy into attack formation, the snowfall ceased and the Russians were subjected to French artillery fire. Nansouty's cavalry charged again and drove off Generalmajor (GM) Sergey Lanskoy's cavalry division. However, just as the French were about to fall upon the Russian infantry, they were charged and defeated by four newly arrived Russian cavalry regiments. These were from GM Ivan Panschulichev's 3rd Dragoon Division. In the melee, the Russians captured 24 guns belonging to the Guard horse artillery. Petre supposed that if Sacken had pushed ahead at this time, he might have broken through the French center, but Blücher was unaware of his opportunity because snow began falling again.

=== Main action ===
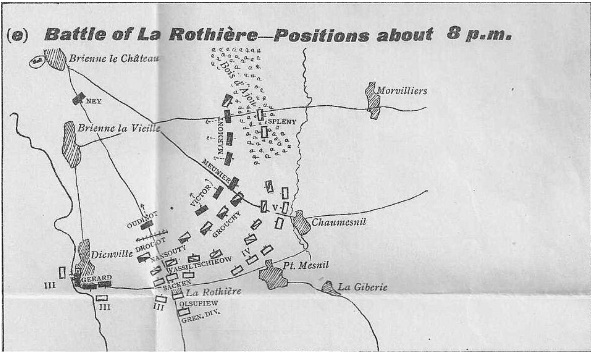
Battle of La Rothière 8pm, 1 Feb 1814 from Petre

At 4:00 pm, Sacken's main attack rolled forward. Because the snow wet the primers and many of the soldiers' muskets would not fire, the attack was made with the bayonet. After putting up a tremendous fight, Duhesme's 4,000 soldiers were driven from La Rothière. However, some French soldiers clung to a few houses on the north edge and all attempts by the Russians to emerge from the village were thrown back by Colbert's cavalry. Gyulai did not come into action until 4:00 pm. The Austrian sent one of his two divisions across the Aube River to attack Dienville from the west bank. Feldmarschall-Leutnant (FML) Jean Hennequin de Fresnel launched GM Philipp Pflüger's brigade at the bridge. The bridge was seized but a French counterattack recovered it. Fresnel then led GM Marko Csollich's brigade against the bridge, but the attack failed. On the east bank, GM Franz Splény's brigade of FML Prince Louis of Hohenlohe-Bartenstein's division attacked Dienville but was repulsed. After this, Gyulai ordered his 12-pounder guns to bombard the village. GM Anton Grimmer's brigade of the same division was ordered away at 7:00 pm to support the effort against La Rothière. With only Franz Splény's brigade available, Gyulai was unable to launch a heavy attack on Gérard's position from the west bank. The Austrians only occupied Dienville at midnight after the French abandoned it.

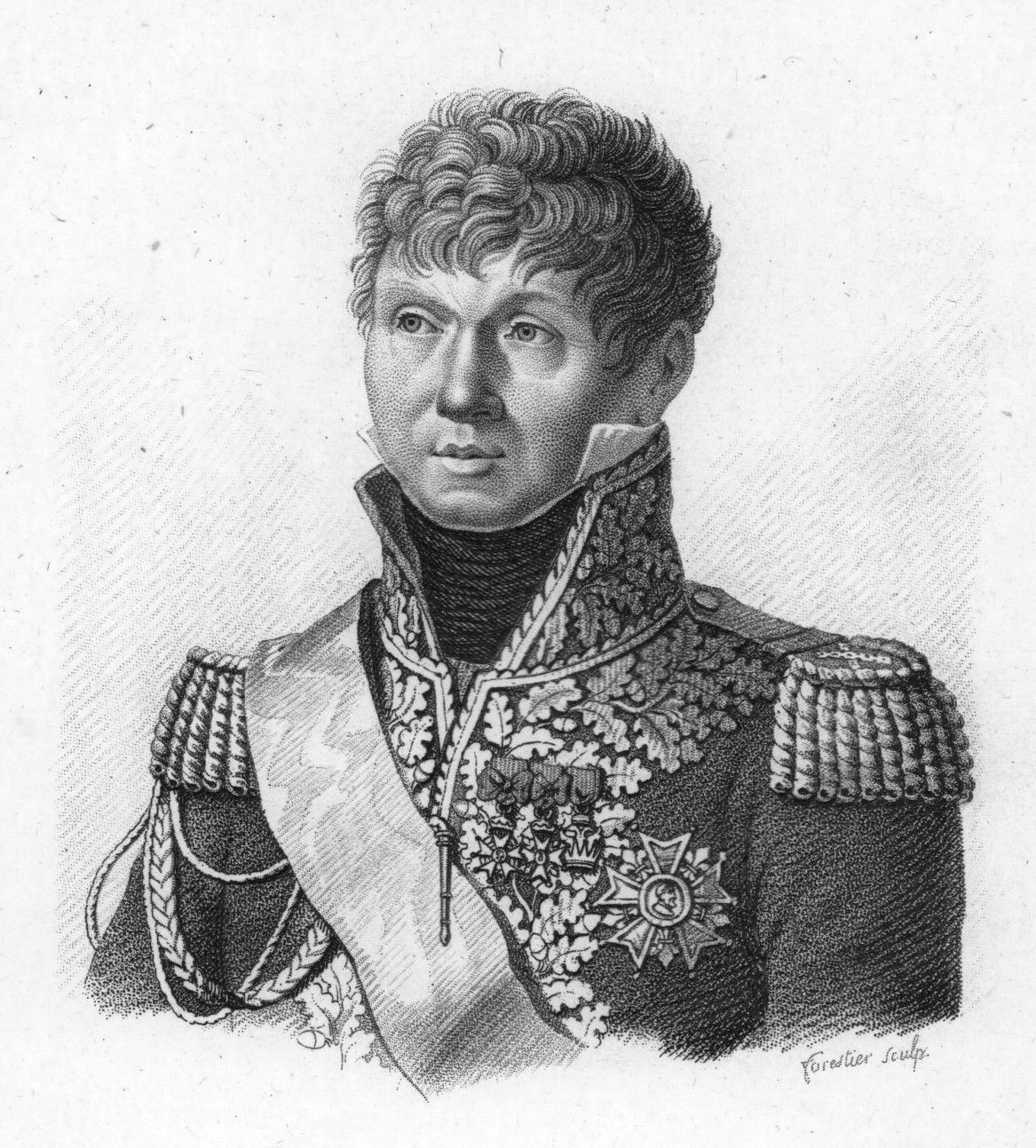
Claude Victor

The Crown Prince's 4th Corps seized Beaulieu Wood, captured La Giberie, only to see Victor's infantry retake it. The Crown Prince urged General Karl Wilhelm von Toll to send him reinforcements. Toll, who was an adviser to Tsar Alexander I of Russia, ordered up two divisions of cuirassiers and one division of grenadiers to assist the 4th Corps without bothering to notify Blücher. The Crown Prince also asked Wrede for help in capturing Chaumesnil. Wrede's progress was slowed when GL Peter Graf von der Pahlen's cavalry, in trying to rejoin the 6th Corps, crossed his line of march. Wrede's advance elements reached La Chaise at 2:00 pm and cleared Marmont's troops out of the Bois d'Ajou at 4:00 pm. When Wrede captured Chaumesnil, Napoleon sent GD Claude Marie Meunier's Guard division and Guyot's cavalry to retake the village. Repeated attacks on Wrede's position were ultimately not successful. Wrede's cavalry got past the French infantry squares and captured 21 artillery pieces about 7:00 pm. The 4th Corps recaptured La Giberie at 5:00 pm and Petit Mesnil soon after.

Unable to break through the French center, Blücher sent for the Reserves only to find that only one grenadier division was available. This was the 2nd Grenadier Division under the command of GM Ivan Paskevich. The other grenadier division and the two cuirassier divisions spent the day marching back and forth without getting into the fighting. Blücher also drew Grimmer's Austrian brigade from Gyulai's corps into the struggle in the center. Seeing the battle was going against him, Napoleon made preparations for a withdrawal and sent Rottembourg's Guard division to retake La Rothière. The leading brigade recaptured the village but was driven out again by Olsufiev's corps. Rottembourg's second brigade cleared the village again but was finally forced to retreat by Grimmer's brigade and the Russian grenadiers. Rottembourg's men reformed north of La Rothière at 8:00 pm. In the dark, the Bavarian and Württemberger cavalry mistakenly charged into each other, halting pursuit. At 9:00 pm, the snowstorm got even worse, allowing the French to break contact and retreat. The fighting ceased and the French retired to Lesmont, leaving Marmont behind to observe Coalition movements.

== Result ==
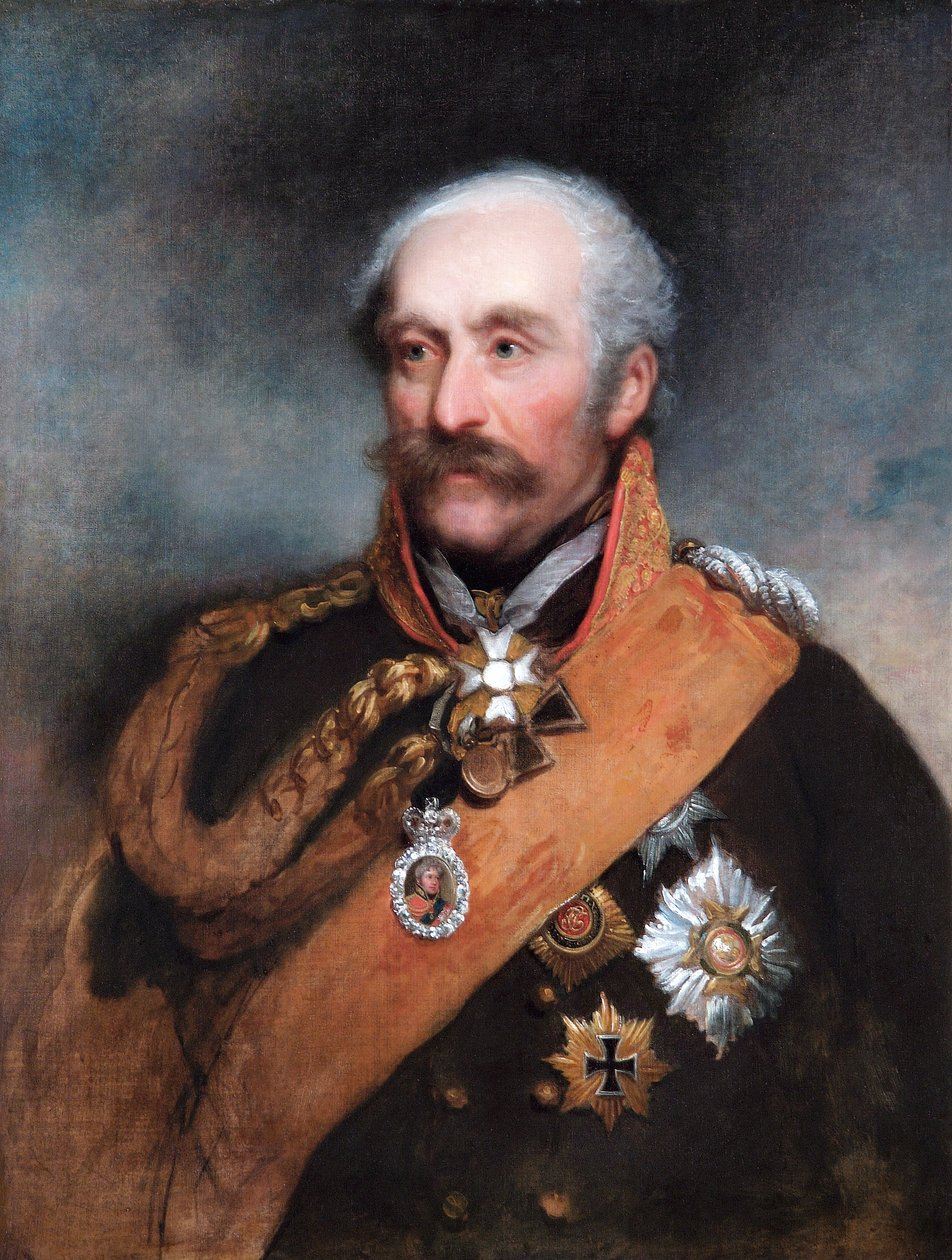
Gebhard von Blücher

Historian Digby Smith stated that French losses numbered 4,600 killed and wounded, plus an additional 1,000 soldiers and 73 guns captured. The large loss of artillery was due in part to the Coalition's cavalry superiority, and in part to the soggy condition of the ground which made it difficult to withdraw the pieces in time. The Coalition had between 6,000 and 7,000 casualties. Bodart stated that the Allies sustained 6,000 casualties while the French lost 3,000 killed and wounded, plus 3,000 men and 63 guns captured. Petre asserted that the Coalition suffered 6,000 casualties, with Sacken losing about 4,000. The French also lost 6,000 men, including 2,000 men and 50–60 guns captured. Chandler assigned losses of 6,000 casualties to each side while stating that 50 French artillery pieces were captured.

Historian assessments of the battle are as follows. Smith claimed, "This was a very significant Allied victory." Chandler wrote, "There was no disguising the fact that the Battle of La Rothière had been a tactical defeat for the Emperor." Petre asserted, "The allies had undoubtedly gained a notable victory..." Nafziger stated, "Now, a second major defeat began to shake the faith of the French army..." Rothenberg wrote, "Blücher ... with a numerical superiority of three to one, he defeated Napoleon at La Rothière on 1 February and drove him back with the loss of 73 guns."

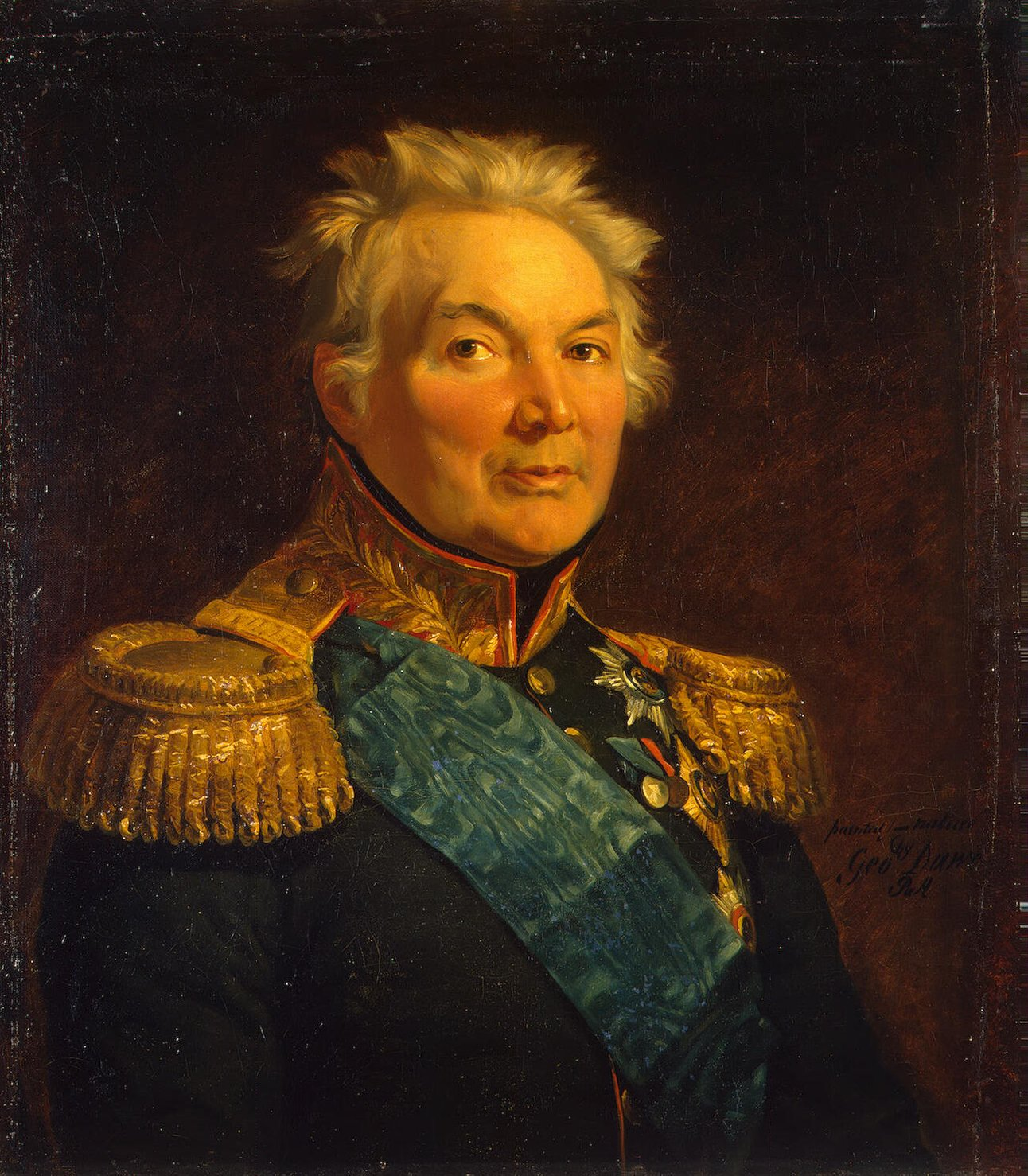
Fabian Osten-Sacken

At the Battle of Lesmont, a French force managed to destroy the town's bridge, and the Coalition force lost contact while the French moved to Troyes. Owing to the state of the roads or to the lethargy within Schwarzenberg's headquarters, no pursuit was attempted, resulting in the Coalition's subsequent defeat. During the retreat to Troyes, 4,000 French soldiers deserted the colors. When Napoleon's defeated army arrived at Troyes, the townspeople showed little interest in helping the soldiers. Meanwhile, the Allies were elated by their victory. Schwarzenberg allowed the two main Allied armies to separate due to his worry that it would be too hard to supply both armies along a single line of communications.

Blücher's army was ordered to march west from Châlons-sur-Marne along the south bank of the Marne River toward Meaux. At the same time, Schwarzenberg's army would move first toward Troyes and then toward Paris along both banks of the Seine River. Wittgenstein's 6th Corps and GM Alexey Seslavin's Cossacks would link the two Allied armies. By 4 February, Schwarzenberg began edging to his left and the next day he and Barclay abruptly ordered Seslavin's Cossacks to shift to the extreme left. They did this without informing Blücher, leaving their colleague in ignorance that his left flank was no longer being watched. Feeling safe, Blücher allowed his 50,000-man army to become dangerously strung out and the result was that Napoleon's 30,000 men struck at its center. On 10 February, outnumbered six-to-one, Olsufiev's small corps was virtually wiped out in the Battle of Champaubert.

== Commentary ==
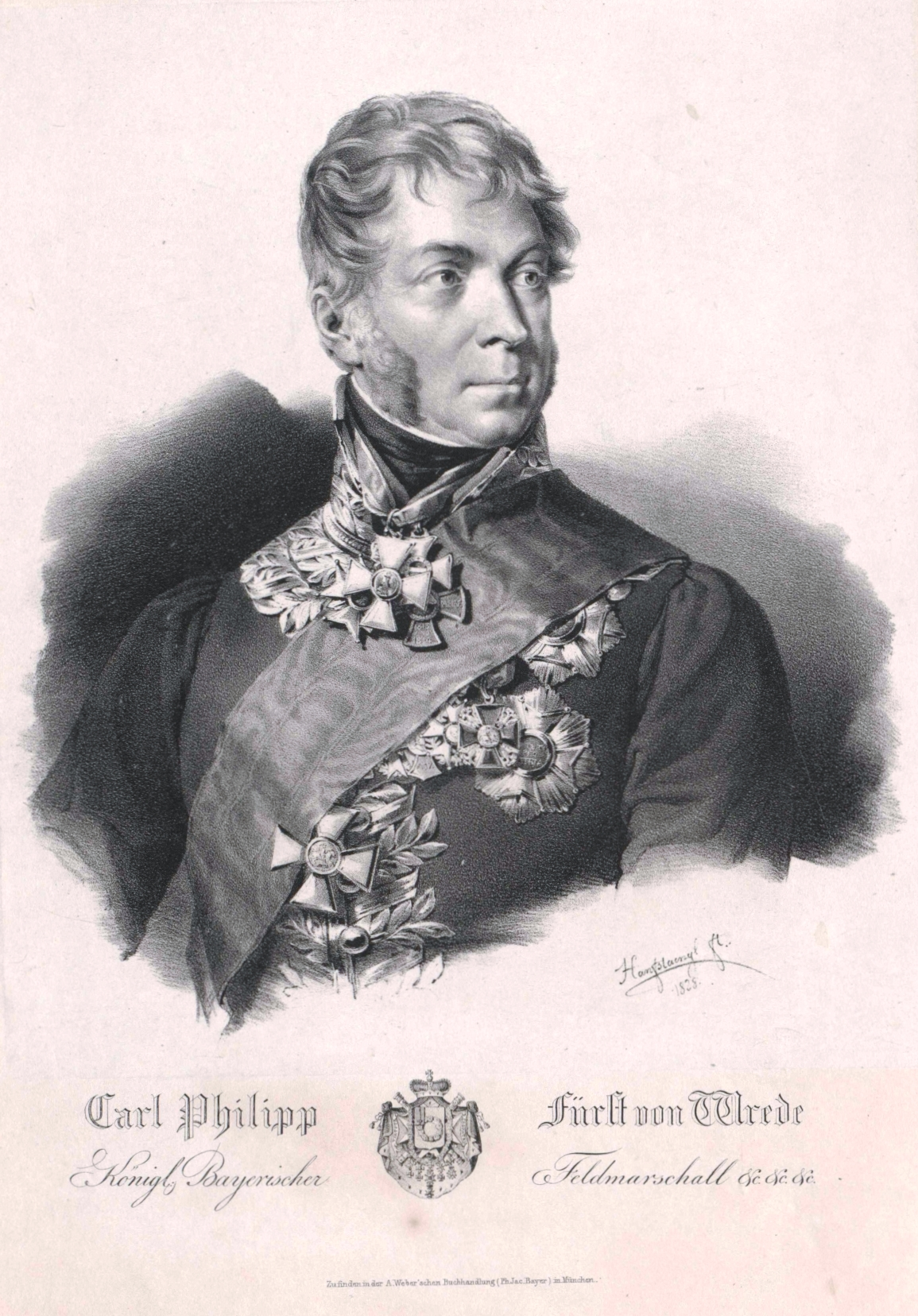
Karl Philipp von Wrede

Chandler wrote that on 30 and 31 January, Napoleon, "somewhat uncharacteristically bided his time, waiting upon events". Petre stated that Napoleon may have avoided retreating because he feared the bad effect this would have on popular opinion. He intended to retreat but waited until it was too late to do so. Petre gave Wrede most of the credit for the victory by challenging Schwarzenberg's orders for the 5th Corps to follow Wittgenstein. Instead, he convinced his army commander that the correct strategy was to move toward Brienne. Petre believed that Blücher was not responsible for the three reserve divisions going astray, but he did not need to hammer at La Rothière when the decisive action was occurring in Wrede's sector.

The result of this battle filled the allies with joy. They had captured 50 guns and 2,000 prisoners, and 4,000 dead or wounded Frenchmen littered the plain, but it was not these trophies or these hecatombs which raised their spirits to such a height: they themselves had had 6,000 men mown down by the grape shot; but they had overthrown Napoleon in fair fight on the soil of France; the charm which had been broken at Leipzig had not been restored, and it was again proved that the Emperor was not invincible. In face of the enormous forces which they had available, the Emperor was as good as beaten — unless he were invincible.

— Henry Houssaye.

== Notes ==
Footnotes

Citations

Preceded by Battle of Brienne	Napoleonic Wars; Battle of La Rothière	Succeeded by Battle of the Mincio River (1814)
