= Battle of Champaubert =

1814 battle during the War of the Sixth Coalition

- Part of the Six Days' Campaign within the Campaign of France of the Sixth Coalition
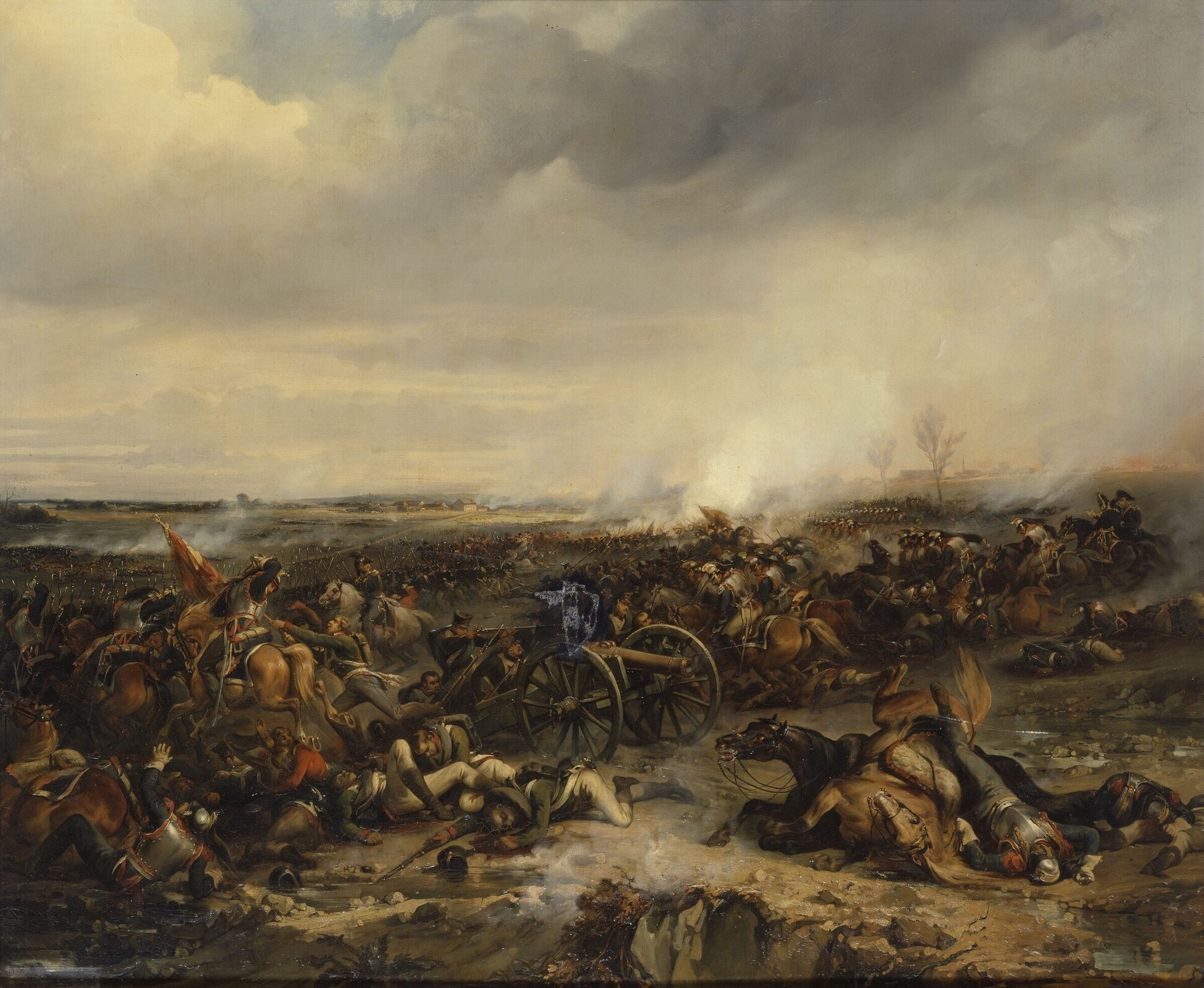
- French cuirassiers charging at the battle
| Date | 10 February 1814 |
| Location | Champaubert, French Empire 48°52′51″N 3°46′33″E |
| Result | French victory |

Belligerents
| Imperial France | Russian Empire |

Commanders and leaders
| Napoleon Bonaparte; Auguste de Marmont | Zakhar Olsufiev (POW) |

Strength
| 5,000–15,000 | 3,700–5,000, 24 guns |

Casualties and losses
| 200–600 | 2,400–4,000, 9 guns |
- Location within France

War of the Sixth Coalition:
Campaign in north-east France
current battle
Napoleon in command
Napoleon not in command

The Battle of Champaubert (10 February 1814) was the opening engagement of the Six Days' Campaign. It was fought between a French army led by Emperor Napoleon and a small Russian corps commanded by Lieutenant General Count Zakhar Dmitrievich Olsufiev. After putting up a good fight, the Russian formation was destroyed; the survivors escaped into the woods while Olsufiev became a French prisoner.

After defeating Napoleon at the Battle of La Rothière nine days earlier, the two main Allied armies under Austrian Field Marshal Karl Philipp, Prince of Schwarzenberg and Prussian Field Marshal Gebhard Leberecht von Blücher separated. Schwarzenberg's southern advance was slow while the Prussian field marshal's march represented a more serious threat to Paris. Leaving part of his forces to hold off Schwarzenberg, Napoleon massed 30,000 troops to deal with Blücher, who allowed his 57,000-man army to become badly spread out. Allied lapses in communication and Blücher's overconfidence left Olsufiev's corps isolated near Champaubert when Napoleon's army lunged from the south to deal it a crushing blow.

Champaubert is located in France, 22 kilometres (14 mi) southwest of Épernay and 85 kilometres (53 mi) east of Paris.

== Prelude ==
=== Allied pursuit ===
On 1 February 1814, Prussian field marshal Gebhard Leberecht von Blücher with 80,000 Allied troops from his own Army of Silesia and Austrian field marshal Karl Philipp, Prince of Schwarzenberg's Army of Bohemia defeated Napoleon and 45,000 French soldiers in the Battle of La Rothière. This setback seriously shook the French army's morale. Each side suffered about 6,000 casualties but the Allies captured 50–60 artillery pieces. The Allies were delighted by their victory, though it might have been more complete if all their reserves had been committed to the battle. At this time, the Allied generals made the questionable decision to separate their armies. Blücher's army would advance from Châlons-sur-Marne toward Meaux while Schwarzenberg's army operated on a more southerly route from Troyes toward Paris.

On 3 February, Napoleon's army reached Troyes after completely breaking contact with the Allies the previous day. On 4 February, Schwarzenberg wrote his colleague Blücher that he was moving farther south in order to turn Napoleon's right flank. The next day, Russian General Michael Andreas Barclay de Tolly ordered Alexander Nikitich Seslavin's scouting force from Schwarzenberg's right flank to the left flank without notifying Blücher. Since the Prussian field marshal did not have a liaison officer with Seslavin's force he did not realize that no one was watching for French forces in the space on his left flank. Also on 5 February, Napoleon decided to abandon Troyes and fall back to Nogent-sur-Seine. He planned to contain Schwarzenberg with part of his army while attacking Blücher.

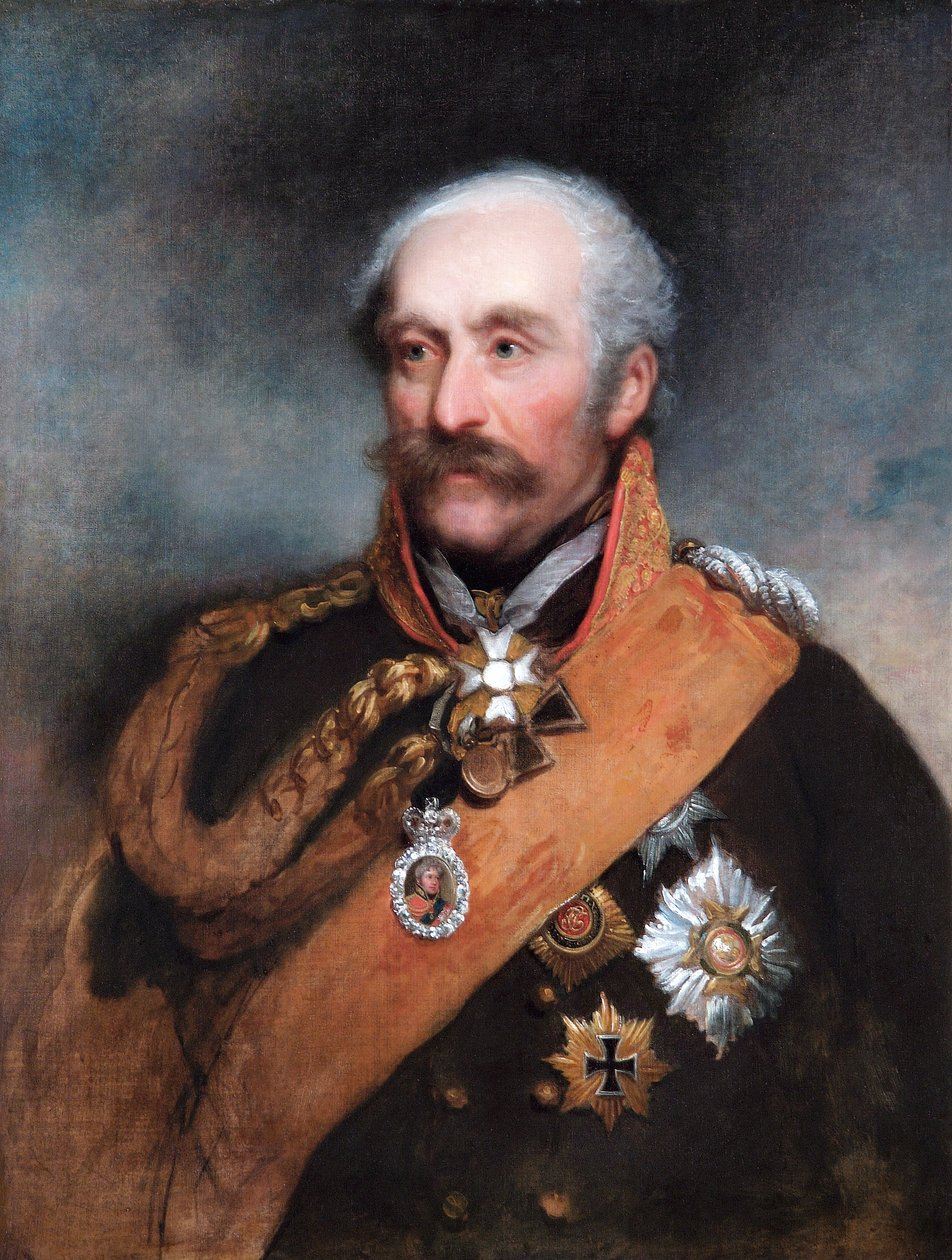
Gebhard von Blücher

Having prepared for a grand assault on Troyes, Schwarzenberg found the place empty of French troops on 7 February. He decided to let his troops rest for the next two days. Meanwhile, Napoleon reorganized his cavalry into the I Cavalry Corps under Étienne Tardif de Pommeroux de Bordesoulle, II Cavalry Corps led by Antoine-Louis Decrest de Saint-Germain, V Cavalry Corps commanded by Édouard Jean Baptiste Milhaud, VI Cavalry Corps directed by François Etienne de Kellermann and an independent division under Jean-Marie Defrance. The French emperor created a new VII Corps from two divisions transferred from the Spanish front and put Marshal Nicolas Oudinot in charge.

At the end of January a 10,000–11,000-man French corps under Marshal Jacques MacDonald approached from the north. Supposing that Schwarzenberg's maneuvers would draw Napoleon away from his Army of Silesia, Blücher focused on destroying MacDonald's corps. During the first week of February, the Prussian field marshal ordered Ludwig Yorck von Wartenburg's corps to pursue MacDonald along the main highway in the Marne River valley. Hoping to trap the French corps, Blücher sent Fabian Gottlieb von Osten-Sacken's corps along the more direct road through Montmirail and La Ferté-sous-Jouarre. Trying to accomplish two strategic goals at once, the Prussian army commander hung back to allow the newly arrived corps of Peter Mikhailovich Kaptzevich and Friedrich von Kleist to catch up with him. Blücher utilized Zakhar Dmitrievich Olsufiev's small corps to link the two parts of his army.

On 8 February, Sacken's cavalry reached Viels-Maisons while his infantry was to the east at Montmirail. Olsufiev's corps was 12 miles (19 km) farther east at Étoges while Blücher established his headquarters another 9 miles (14 km) east at Vertus. Kaptzevich and Kleist were 16 miles (26 km) east of their army commander in Châlons-sur-Marne. Yorck's corps was in the Marne valley at least 12 miles (19 km) to the north, separated by bad roads. The Army of Silesia was now spread across a front of 44 miles (71 km). Blucher assumed that Seslavin would report any danger coming from the south. That night, when his Cossacks were driven out of Sézanne, Sacken did not bother to report the incident to Blücher. In fact, it was Napoleon's leading corps under Marshal Auguste de Marmont.

=== French offensive ===
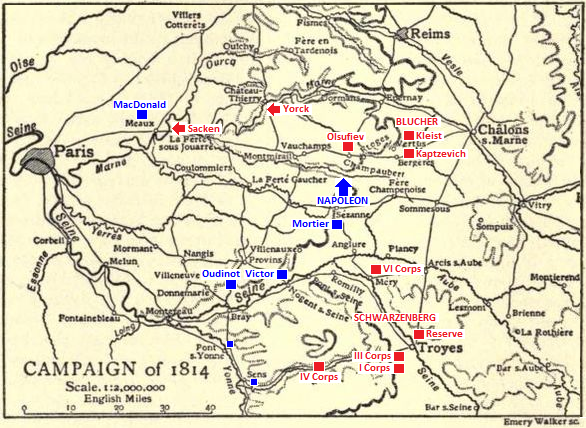
Napoleon attacks Olsufiev's isolated corps on 10 February 1814.

Napoleon left 39,000 troops to contain Schwarzenberg's Army of Bohemia. The formations were Oudinot's VII Corps, Marshal Claude Perrin Victor's II Corps, Étienne Maurice Gérard's Reserve of Paris, Henri Rottembourg's Young Guard infantry division, Milhaud's V Cavalry Corps and smaller units. Napoleon's striking force numbered about 20,000 foot soldiers and 10,000 horsemen. Another authority agreed that the French army numbered 30,000 men and added that it was supported by 120 guns. The army was formed by Marshal Michel Ney's two Young Guard infantry divisions, Marmont's VI Corps, part of the Imperial Guard cavalry, I Cavalry Corps and Defrance's cavalry division. Bringing up the rear at Nogent was Marshal Édouard Mortier, duc de Trévise with two Old Guard infantry divisions.

On 9 February, MacDonald slipped across the Marne at La Ferté-sous-Jouarre, just ahead of Sacken. That day, Kaptzevich and Kleist rendezvoused with Blücher at Vertus, Olsufiev marched west to Champaubert, Sacken reached La Ferté-sous-Jouarre and Yorck was at Château-Thierry. According to Karl Freiherr von Müffling of Blücher's staff, the Army of Silesia counted 57,000 men, including Sacken's 20,000, Yorck's 18,000 and Kaptzevich, Olsufiev and Kleist with a combined 19,000. Marmont's cavalry advance guard appeared at Talus-Saint-Prix on the Petit Morin River. Because the horsemen soon withdrew, Blücher's chief of staff August Neidhardt von Gneisenau believed they represented no danger. When Schwarzenberg asked the Prussian field marshal to support his right flank corps under Peter Wittgenstein, Blücher ordered Kaptzevich and Kleist to march southwest to Sézanne the next day. Olsufiev was ordered to march south from Champaubert. That night, Blücher finally received news that Napoleon was at Sézanne. Nevertheless, Gneisenau authorized Sacken to continue the pursuit of MacDonald to the west.

Napoleon's soldiers plodded along roads deep in mud from days of rain. The men had to suffer hunger pangs when the provision wagons failed to turn up. The bogged artillery was only brought forward when the rural inhabitants in large numbers helped haul the guns through the mud. At first the French population had resigned itself to the Allied invasion, but after suffering at the hands of the Russians and Prussians, the people were eager to assist the army. On 10 February, as Blücher accompanied the column of Kaptzevich and Kleist while it marched toward Sézanne, the sound of artillery began to rumble ominously to the right near Champaubert.

== Battle ==
=== Action ===
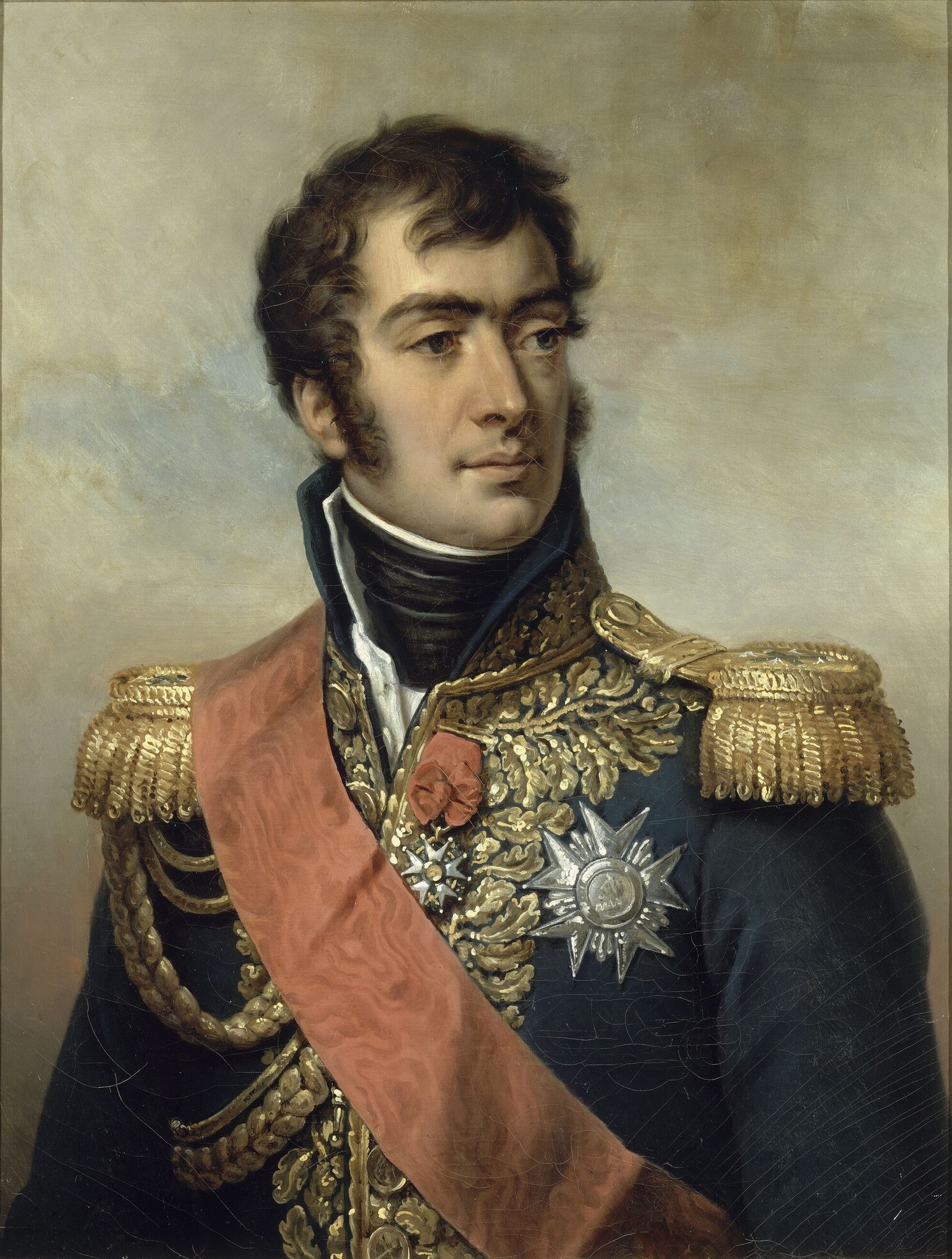
Auguste de Marmont

On 10 February Napoleon moved against Blücher's over-extended army in the hope of smashing it. He caught Olsufiev's IX Corps of 5,000 Russians near the village of Baye just south of Champaubert. The battle was one of the few times during the war that France was able to take the field with a large numerical advantage, in this case six-to-one. Planning to march south to Sézanne that day, Olsufiev left the Saint-Prix bridge over the Petit Morin intact. He also left the span unguarded, so that Napoleon's cavalry seized it early in the morning. Marmont's two VI Corps divisions led the French column. Joseph Lagrange's 3rd Division filed across the Saint-Prix bridge followed by Étienne Pierre Sylvestre Ricard's 8th Division. Following Napoleon's instructions, 100 Guard Dragoons rode ahead into Bannay where they surprised and captured a group of Russian soldiers.

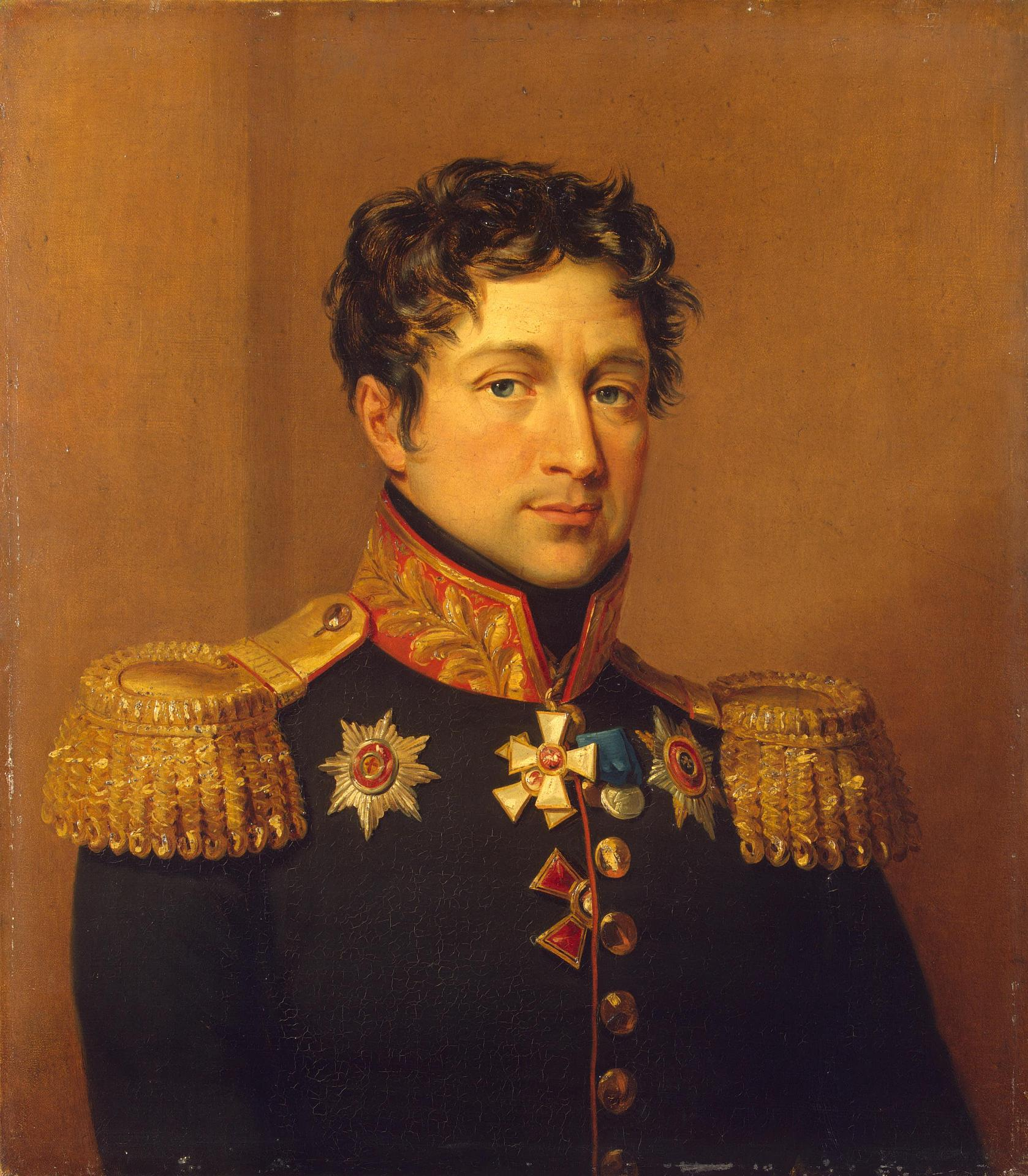
Zakhar Olsufiev

Olsufiev's pickets were overrun by 10:00 am and although badly outnumbered, the Russian decided to fight rather than retreat. His decision was based partly on the mistaken hope that he would get reinforcements from Blücher in time to prevent a disaster. The correct decision would have been to retreat east to Étoges, but the Russian general had been criticized for the loss of the château during the Battle of Brienne on 29 January. He was also blamed for mishandling his troops at La Rothière and Sacken wanted him hauled before a court-martial. In the circumstances, Olsufiev chose to battle it out in order to clear his name. He did, however, send messengers to the Prussian army commander telling his superior what was occurring. In the event, Blücher brushed aside Olsufiev's couriers, insisting that Napoleon was not on the scene and that the attackers were no more than 2,000 French partisans.

Lagrange's division angled to the left toward Bannay, led by the 2nd Light Infantry Regiment and a marine battalion, while Ricard's division marched straight toward Baye. Olsufiev sent Evstafi Evstafievich Udom with two jäger infantry battalions to clear the French skirmishers out of Baye. As the French pressure increased, Udom was reinforced so that he had the 10th, 12th, 22nd and 38th Jäger Regiments and six guns. Around 11:00 am Ricard pressed Udom's troops back into Baye and the nearby woods. Olsufiev sent a brigade and six guns to hold the right flank while the bulk of his corps deployed between Baye and Bannay. The French brought 12 guns into action as more and more of their soldiers passed the bridge and arrived on the field. Pierre Pelleport's brigade led Lagrange's division as it assaulted Bannay. At 1:00 pm Olsufiev was still holding out on his forward position. At that hour, the Russian commander held a council of war in which his generals voted for a retreat to Étoges. Olsufiev refused, saying that he had specific orders to hold Champaubert.

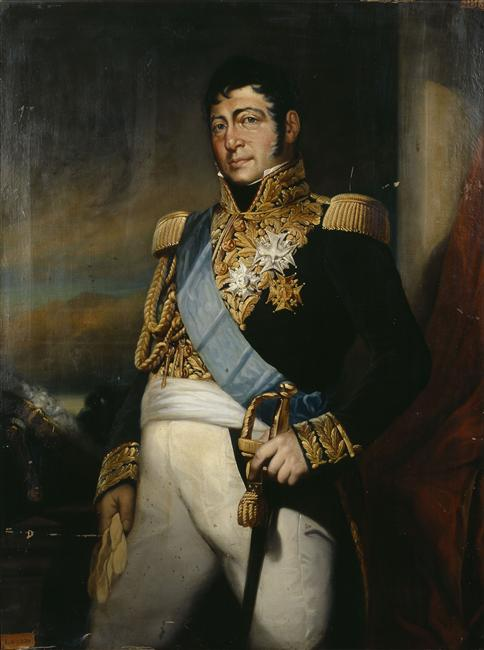
Étienne de Bordesoulle

Seeing that a small wood was the key to the position, Marmont organized a general attack. He sent the 113th Line Infantry forward deployed in skirmish order. Assisted by a horse artillery battery from I Cavalry Corps and a lancer squadron under Cyrille-Simon Picquet, Ricard's division captured Baye. Lagrange attacked between Baye and Bannay. Ney's divisions began to arrive and his guns pounded Bannay. Bordesoulle's cavalry on the right and Jean-Pierre Doumerc's on the left began edging around the Russian flanks. The 7th Battalion of the 4th Light Infantry were the first French troops to occupy Baye while Pelleport's brigade took Bannay. Olsufiev pulled back and established a new line at the Andecy Farm. As French cavalry began to envelop both flanks, the Russians withdrew again toward Champaubert.

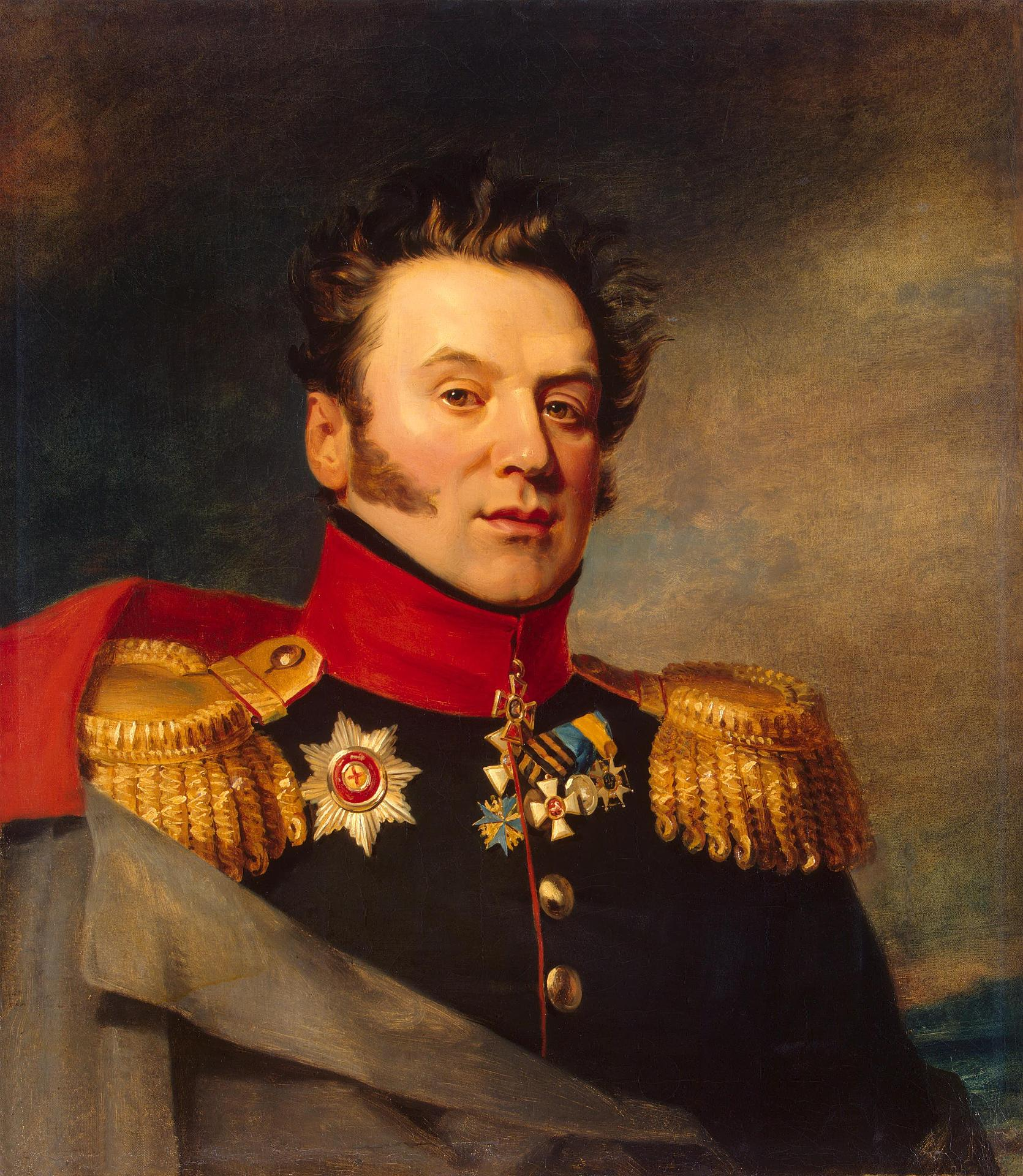
Konstantin Poltoratsky

Since the terrain favored the French on the west flank, Lagrange launched an attack on that side. Without proper artillery support, the French infantry were stopped and thrown back by the concentrated fire of 24 Russian guns. Numerous French Guard field pieces, slowed by the mud, soon appeared and provided a rallying point for Lagrange's men. After taking a detour, Doumerc's horsemen appeared at Fromentières on the highway west of Champaubert. When Olsufiev received reports that the road east to Châlons was also blocked, he resolved to cut his way out in that direction. The Russian commander directed Prince Konstantin Poltoratsky with the Apsheron and Nacheburg Infantry Regiments and nine guns to hold Champaubert, while he attacked east toward Étoges with the bulk of his troops. Olsufiev's breakout attempt failed.

With his artillery posted at the Champaubert crossroads, Poltoratsky's brigade drove off several cavalry charges. In fierce fighting with the bayonet, Ricard's soldiers captured the village, lost it to a counterattack, then clawed their way back into a few houses. After failing to cut his way out to the east, about 3:00 pm Poltoratsky began a fighting withdrawal to the north with his men in square formation. Heading for the village of La Caure, his soldiers kept the French back with regular volleys. About 2 miles (3.2 km) north of Champaubert they began to run out of ammunition and their ranks began to show unsteadiness. The French demanded that Poltoratsky capitulate and when he refused, they brought up a horse artillery battery and began blasting his troops with canister shot. Instead of being a possible refuge, the nearby woods turned out to be filled with French skirmishers. With his men being mown down by canister and riddled by musketry, Poltoratsky finally agreed to surrender his two regiments and cannons.

After failing to force its way to Étoges, Olsufiev's main body veered to the north in an attempt to escape. Near La Caure, while maneuvering to enter a swampy forest, he exposed one of his flanks. Spotting the tactical error, Marmont ordered a brigade of Bordesoulle's cuirassiers to charge. The heavy cavalrymen crashed into the Russian formation, cutting it in two parts. The Russian foot soldiers were completely routed, some of them throwing away their muskets and packs as they scattered into the woods. Marmont ordered the exits blocked and many Russians were captured. Udom and his fellow division commander Peter Yakovlevich Kornilov managed to get away with 1,500–2,000 men. That night they reached Port-à-Binson on the Marne after going cross-country. A 19-year old French conscript with fewer than six months of service made Olsufiev a prisoner.

== Aftermath ==
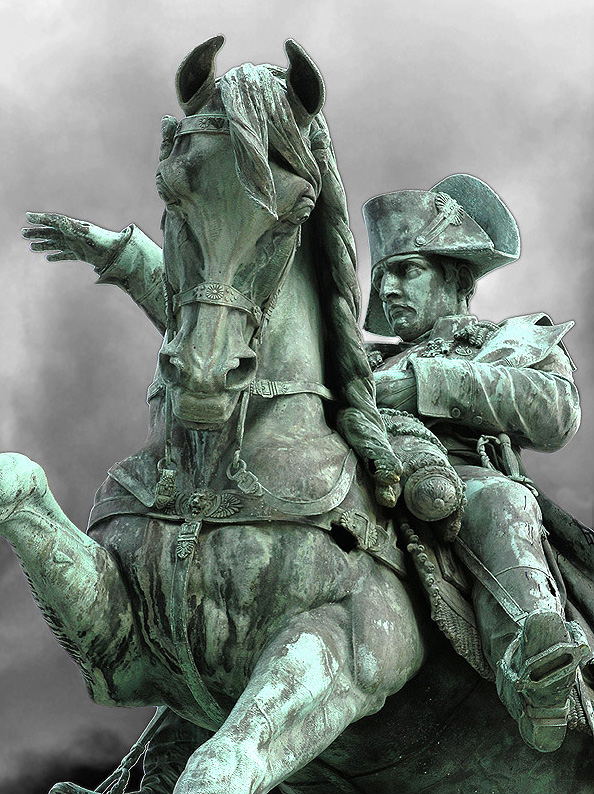
Napoleon

According to Digby Smith the French lost 600 killed and wounded out of the 13,300 infantry and 1,700 cavalry that were engaged in the action. The Russians lost 2,400 men and 9 guns out of the 3,700 soldiers and 24 guns that were present. Captured were General-Leutnant Olsufiev and General-major Prince Konstantin Poltoratsky. Francis Loraine Petre credited Olsufiev with 4,000 infantry and 24 guns of which 1,600–1,700 men and 15 guns escaped. George Nafziger cited several sources including one that listed Russian losses as 1,400 dead and 1,894 captured including three generals and 21 guns, with 1,900 troops getting away. French losses were estimated at 200–600. David G. Chandler stated that French losses were only about 200 men and that only 1,000 out of 5,000 Russians escaped death or capture. Gaston Bodart stated that the Russians lost 2,400 men and 9 guns out of the 4,000 soldiers and 24 guns engaged. Bodart gave French casualties as 600 out of 5,000 men engaged. Kornilov assumed command of the remnant of IX Corps. Its approximately 1,500 survivors were grouped into three or four temporary battalions. This unlucky outfit suffered 600 more casualties and lost all their cannons at the Battle of Vauchamps on 14 February.

When Blücher heard about Olsufiev's disaster, he ordered Kaptzevich and Kleist to turn around and make a night march back to Vertus. Sacken, who had marched west to Trilport, was ordered to return to Montmirail. Yorck was requested to meet Sacken near Montmirail while holding open an escape route over the Marne at Château-Thierry. After the battle, Napoleon found himself squarely in the middle of the overextended Army of Silesia. If he advanced to the east, he would merely push the corps of Kaptzevich and Kleist back. A move to the west held the possibility of trapping and destroying the forces under Sacken and Yorck, so he turned west. Napoleon ordered Marmont with Lagrange's division and the I Cavalry Corps to hold Étoges and keep Blücher under observation. At 7:00 pm the emperor directed Étienne Marie Antoine Champion de Nansouty with two cavalry divisions to occupy Montmirail. They were to be joined there in the morning by Ricard's division and the divisions under Ney and Mortier. The Battle of Montmirail was fought the next day against Sacken and Yorck.

== Footnotes ==
| Preceded by Battle of the Mincio River (1814) | Napoleonic Wars; Battle of Champaubert | Succeeded by Battle of Montmirail |
