= Champaubert =

Commune in Grand Est, France

- Commune
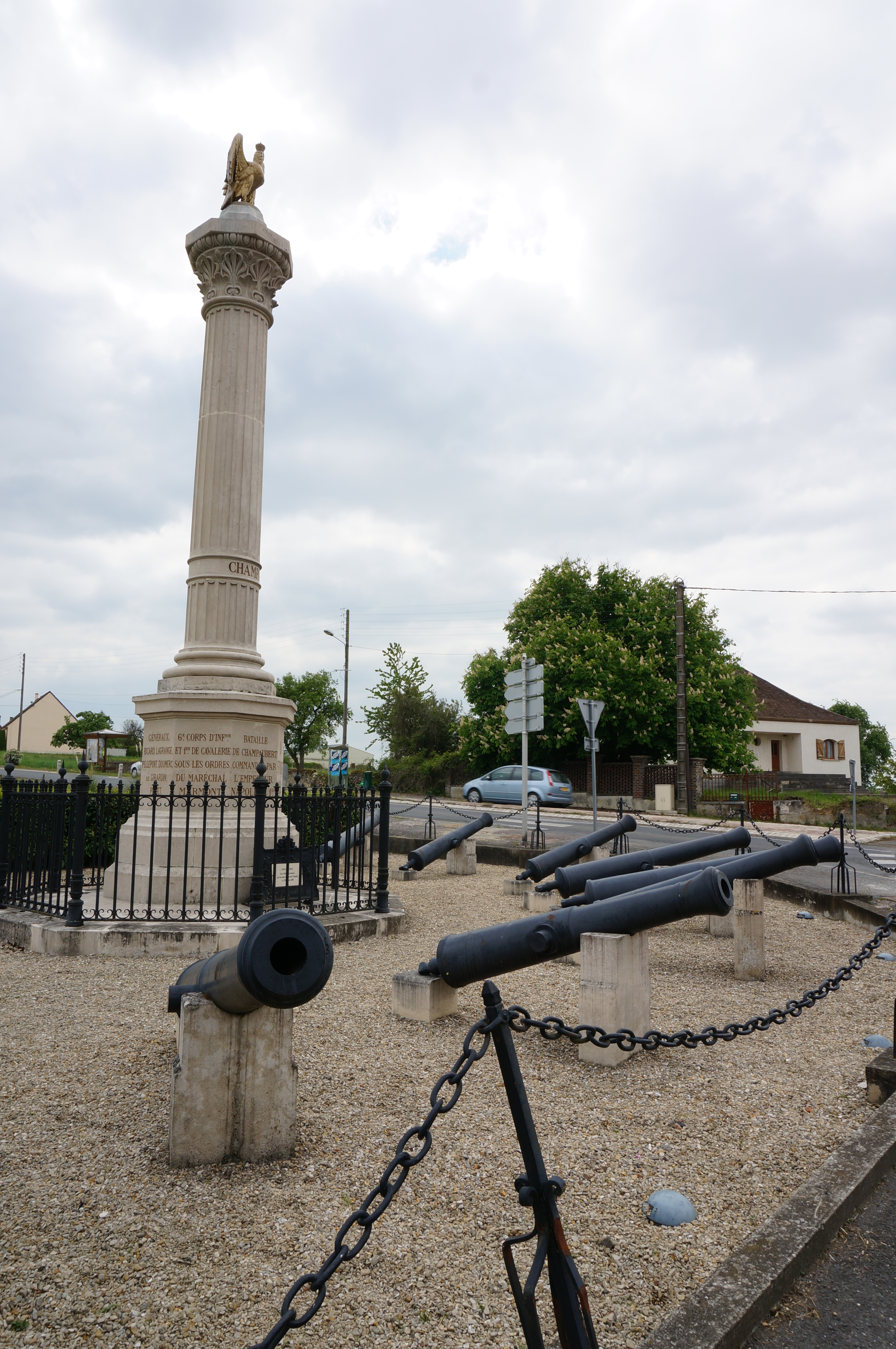
- Battle of Champaubert memorial
- Location of Champaubert
- Location within France Location within Grand Est
- Coordinates: 48°52′51″N 3°46′33″E
- Country: France
- Region: Grand Est
- Department: Marne
- Arrondissement: Épernay
- Canton: Dormans-Paysages de Champagne
- Intercommunality: Paysages de la Champagne

Government
  - Mayor (2020–2026): Jacques Constantidini
- Area^{1}: 12.75 km^{2} (4.92 sq mi)
- Elevation: 234 m (768 ft)
- Population (2023): 123
  - Density: 9.65/km^{2} (25.0/sq mi)
- Time zone: UTC+01:00 (CET)
  - Summer (DST): UTC+02:00 (CEST)
- INSEE/Postal code: 51113 /51270
- ^{1} French Land Register data, which excludes lakes, ponds, glaciers > 1 km^{2} (0.386 sq mi or 247 acres) and river estuaries.

Champaubert (French pronunciation: [ʃɑ̃pobɛʁ]) is a commune in the Marne department in north-eastern France.

== See also ==
- Communes of the Marne department
