= Zakhar Dmitrievich Olsufiev =

Russian lieutenant general (1773–1835)

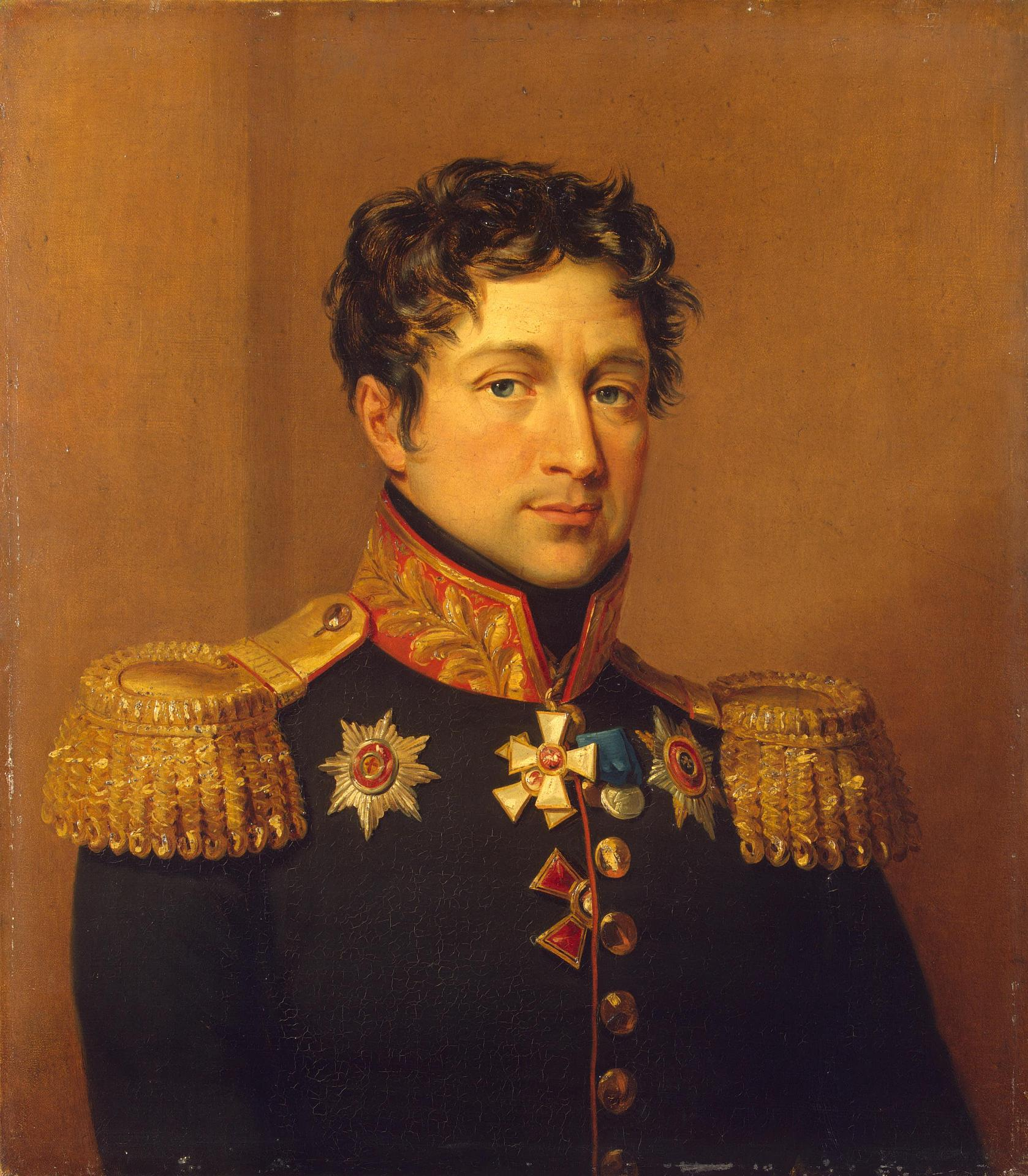
- Portrait by George Dawe, 1820–1826
- Born: 24 March 1773
- Died: 20 March 1835 (aged 61) Saint Petersburg, Russia
- Allegiance: Russia
- Branch: Imperial Russian Army
- Service years: 1786–1820
- Rank: Lieutenant general
- Commands: 9th Infantry Corps
- Conflicts: War of the Third Coalition; Battle of Austerlitz; War of the Fourth Coalition; Battle of Eylau; Battle of Heilsberg; French invasion of Russia; Battle of Borodino; Battle of Vyazma; War of the Sixth Coalition; Battle of Katzbach; Battle of Leipzig; Battle of Brienne; Battle of La Rothière; Battle of Champaubert (POW)

Zakhar Dmitrievich Olsufiev (Russian: Захар Дмитриевич Олсуфьев; 24 March 1773 – 20 March 1835) was a Russian lieutenant general. He served in the Imperial Russian Army during the reigns of Paul I and Alexander I.

== Military career ==
He was enrolled in the Izmailovsky Life Guards Regiment and reached the rank of lieutenant in 1788 and general major in 1798. He retired for two years, presumably due to political conflicts under Paul I.

In 1805, he commanded a brigade at Austerlitz, and in 1807, he was wounded at Eylau and Heilsberg. The same year, he was promoted to lieutenant general.

In 1812, he commanded the 17th Division at Borodino and Vyazma. After being promoted to head the 9th Infantry Corps, he fought at Katzbach and Leipzig in 1813 and at Brienne and La Rothière in 1814. On 10 February 1814, he commanded a 5,000-man Russian infantry corps during the Battle of Champaubert in an attempt to stop a 30,000-man army under Napoleon. His small corps was effectively destroyed and he became a French prisoner of war.

== Sources ==
- Goetz, Robert (2005). 1805, Austerlitz: Napoleon and the Destruction of the Third Coalition. Greenhill Books. ISBN 978-1-85367-644-4.
