= Morvilliers, Aube =

Commune in Grand Est, France

Morvilliers
- Commune
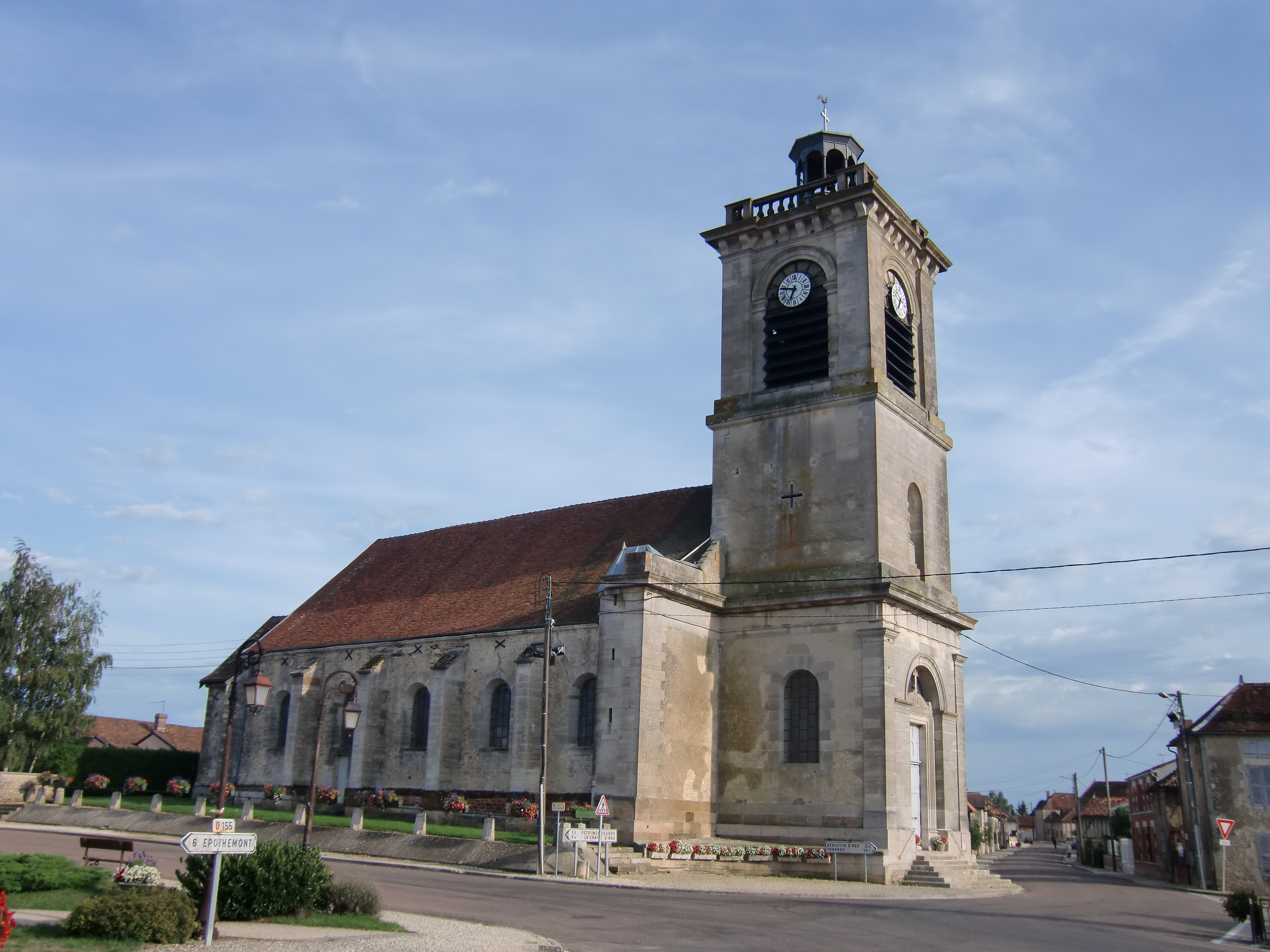
- The church in Morvilliers
- Location of Morvilliers
- Location within France Location within Grand Est
- Coordinates: 48°22′53″N 4°37′11″E
- Country: France
- Region: Grand Est
- Department: Aube
- Arrondissement: Bar-sur-Aube
- Canton: Bar-sur-Aube

Government
  - Mayor (2020–2026): Lionel Huard
- Area^{1}: 15.64 km^{2} (6.04 sq mi)
- Elevation: 150 m (490 ft)
- Population (2023): 273
  - Density: 17.5/km^{2} (45.2/sq mi)
- Time zone: UTC+01:00 (CET)
  - Summer (DST): UTC+02:00 (CEST)
- INSEE/Postal code: 10258 /10500
- ^{1} French Land Register data, which excludes lakes, ponds, glaciers > 1 km^{2} (0.386 sq mi or 247 acres) and river estuaries.

Morvilliers (French pronunciation: [mɔʁvilje]) is a commune in the Aube department in north-central France.

== Population ==
Historical population
Year	Pop.	±% p.a.
1968	320	—
1975	291	−1.35%
1982	251	−2.09%
1990	247	−0.20%
1999	264	+0.74%
2007	271	+0.33%
2012	312	+2.86%
2017	300	−0.78%
2023	273	−1.56%
Source: INSEE

== See also ==
- Communes of the Aube department
