= Lesmont =

Commune in Grand Est, France

- Commune
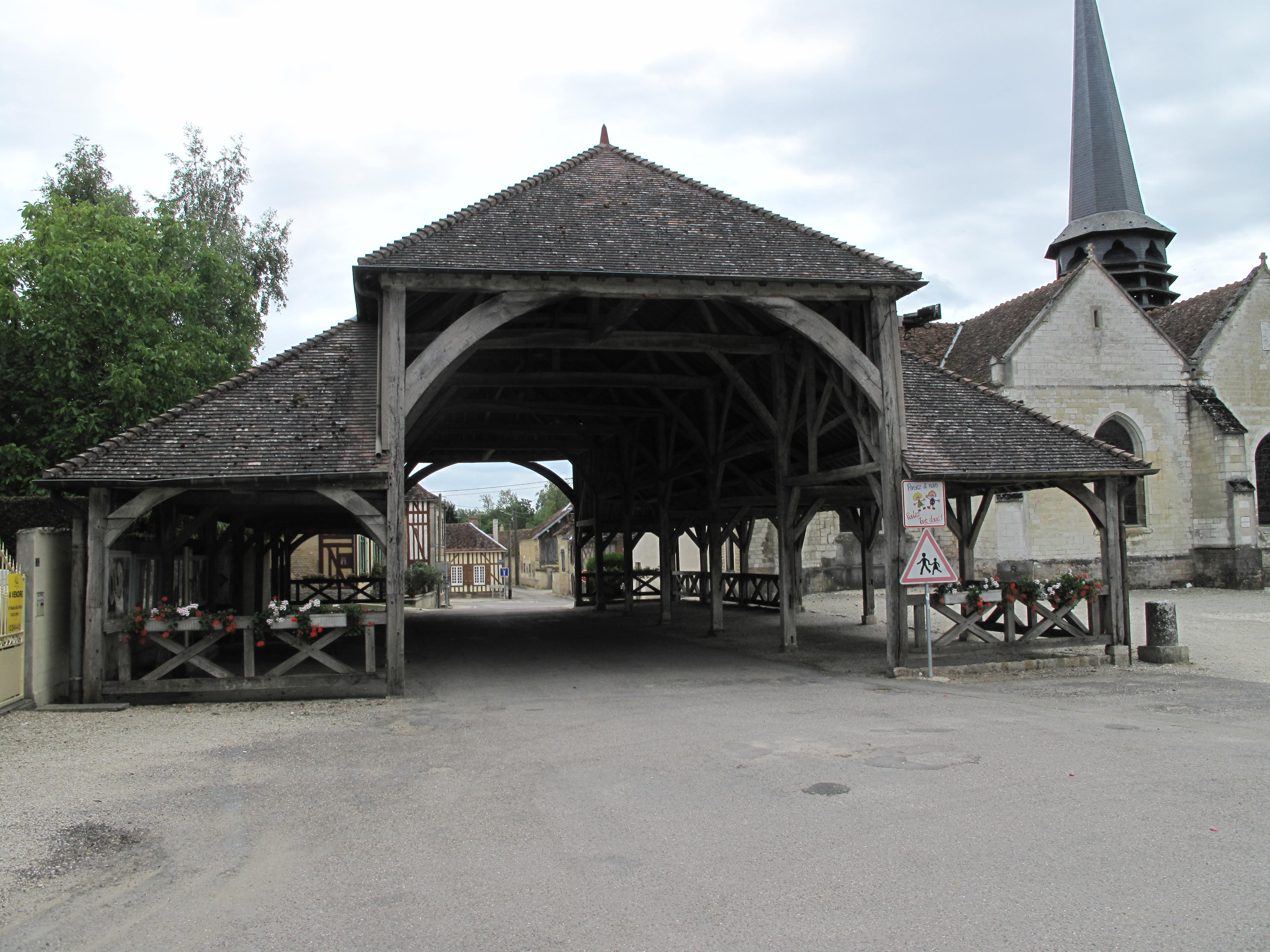
- Market and church
- Location of Lesmont
- Location within France Location within Grand Est
- Coordinates: 48°25′42″N 4°24′55″E
- Country: France
- Region: Grand Est
- Department: Aube
- Arrondissement: Bar-sur-Aube
- Canton: Brienne-le-Château
- Intercommunality: Lacs de Champagne

Government
  - Mayor (2020–2026): Xavier Schmidt
- Area^{1}: 9.92 km^{2} (3.83 sq mi)
- Elevation: 112 m (367 ft)
- Population (2023): 298
  - Density: 30.0/km^{2} (77.8/sq mi)
- Time zone: UTC+01:00 (CET)
  - Summer (DST): UTC+02:00 (CEST)
- INSEE/Postal code: 10193 /10500
- ^{1} French Land Register data, which excludes lakes, ponds, glaciers > 1 km^{2} (0.386 sq mi or 247 acres) and river estuaries.

Lesmont is a commune in the Aube department in north-central France.

== Population ==
Historical population
Year	Pop.	±% p.a.
1968	328	—
1975	260	−3.26%
1982	281	+1.12%
1990	244	−1.75%
1999	301	+2.36%
2007	355	+2.08%
2012	331	−1.39%
2017	306	−1.56%
2023	298	−0.44%
Source: INSEE

== See also ==
- Communes of the Aube department
- Parc naturel régional de la Forêt d'Orient
