= Hippolyte Piré =

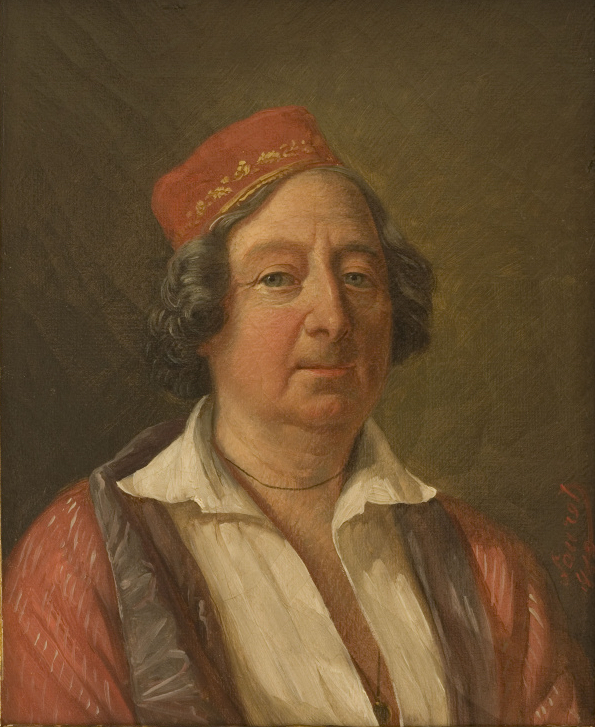
Portrait by Emmanuel Lauret, 1842

Hippolyte-Marie-Guillaume de Rosnyvinen, Comte de Piré, (Rennes, 31 March 1778 – Paris, 20 July 1850) was a French general who fought in the Napoleonic Wars.

His name is inscribed on the second column of the Northern Pillar of the Arc de Triomphe.
