= Jean Antoine de Collaert =

French general

- Born: 13 June 1761; Liège, Holy Roman Empire
- Died: 17 June 1816 (aged 55); Brussels, Kingdom of the Netherlands
- Military career
- Allegiance: Habsburg Austria; Dutch Republic; Batavian Republic; Kingdom of Holland; First French Empire; United Kingdom of the Netherlands
- Branch: Cavalry
- Service years: c. 1778 (Habsburgs) c. 1786 (Dutch Republic); 1795–1806 (Batavian Republic); 1806–1810 (Holland); 1810–1815 (France); 1815–1816 (Netherlands)
- Rank: Captain (Habsburgs); Major (Dutch Republic); Colonel (Batavian Republic); Major general (Holland); Général de brigade (France); Lieutenant general (Netherlands)
- Conflicts: War of the Bavarian Succession; War of the Second Coalition; Battle of Castricum; War of the Fourth Coalition; War of the Sixth Coalition; Battle of Dresden; Battle of Leipzig; Battle of Sainte-Croix; Battle of La Rothière; Battle of Mormant; Battle of Saint-Dizier; Hundred Days; Battle of Waterloo
- Awards: Légion d'Honneur, KC 1813; Order of Saint-Louis, 1814; Military William Order, KC 1815

Jean Marie Antoine Philippe de Collaert (13 June 1761 – 17 June 1816) led the Dutch-Belgian cavalry division at the Battle of Waterloo. He became an officer in the Habsburg Austrian cavalry in 1778 and later served in the Dutch Republic army until 1786. After the armies of the French First Republic overran the Dutch Republic in 1795, Collaert became a lieutenant colonel of hussars in the new army of the Batavian Republic, a French satellite state. He fought with distinction at the Battle of Castricum in 1799 and was badly wounded fighting the Austrians in 1800. He was promoted colonel in 1803. Under the Kingdom of Holland he became a major general in 1806 and colonel-general of the King's Bodyguard in 1808.

After Holland was annexed to the First French Empire, Collaert entered French service as a general of brigade and was assigned to garrison duty for two years. In 1813 he was appointed to command a French cavalry brigade in the German Campaign. That year he led his horsemen at Dresden, Leipzig and Sainte-Croix-en-Plaine. In 1814 he fought at La Rothière, Mormant and Saint-Dizier. Going to the newly created Kingdom of the Netherlands in 1815, he was soon appointed lieutenant general of its cavalry. He was badly wounded at Waterloo on 18 June and died of his injuries a year later.

== Early career ==
=== Austrian and Dutch service ===
Collaert was born on 13 June 1761 at Liège in the Austrian Netherlands. His parents were Marie Joseph Ferdinand, Baron of Collaert, a one time adjutant to a Prussian prince, and Marianna Hauben. In 1778 he entered the Habsburg Austrian army and was promoted to first lieutenant in March of that year and later to cavalry-captain. At some point he and his older brother Marie Joseph Gerard de Collaert joined the Mattha Dragoon Regiment in the army of the Dutch Republic. He was a captain but was mustered out in 1786 after an army reorganization. In 1787 he held the rank of major in the Dutch service.

=== Batavian Republic: 1795–1805 ===
When Republican France overran the Dutch Republic in 1795, Collaert joined the army of the new Batavian Republic on 8 July as a lieutenant colonel of the Hussar Regiment. During the Anglo-Russian invasion of Holland in 1799, he fought at the Battle of Castricum on 6 October where he distinguished himself. Two days later his hussars captured 200 British soldiers near Petten. In the 1800 campaign on the Main River, he was under the command of Jean-Baptiste Dumonceau and received two serious wounds while leading two squadrons of hussars against an Habsburg Austrian sortie from Aschaffenburg on 23 November. On that occasion he won a glowing report from Pierre Augereau and a sword of honor from his government. He was promoted colonel of the 1st Batavian Hussar Regiment on 18 July 1803. The regiment was stationed in the Zeist training camp in 1805 before being sent to Texel. On 28 June that year he was replaced as commander and appointed colonel-commandant of the Pension Counsel Schimmelpennick.

=== Holland service: 1806–1809 ===
After Louis Bonaparte became sovereign of the newly created Kingdom of Holland, Collaert was promoted to major general on 7 March 1806. Another source stated that the promotion occurred on 6 April 1807. He was named commander of the 4th Military District at Deventer on 6 July 1806. He was assigned to go to the Zeist training camp on 13 September and led a brigade in Claude Ignace François Michaud's division went it left to fight against the Kingdom of Prussia on 25 September. However he soon resigned because of bad health and was replaced in command by Karel Frans Joseph Maschek in October.

He was appointed a knight of the Order of the Reunion on 1 January 1807, a commander on 16 February and a grand officer of the order on 19 May the same year. He was named colonel-general of the Dutch Royal Guard on 8 May 1807. He retired from the army on 3 August 1808 with a pension of 4,000 guilders, later raised to 6,000. He briefly returned to active service on 7 August 1809 during the Walcheren Campaign, assuming command of Breda. However, he broke his leg and had to resign command two weeks later.

== French service: 1811–1814 ==
After the First French Empire absorbed the Kingdom of Holland, Collaert joined the French army as a general of brigade on 2 January 1811. He was sent to the Illyrian Provinces where took command of the 1st Brigade of Alexis Joseph Delzons' 1st Division of the Observation Army of Italy. From 1811 until 1 April 1813 he commanded the garrison of Zadar (Zara). On 25 March 1813 he was appointed to lead a cavalry brigade in Germany. At his new assignment in Jean-Toussaint Arrighi de Casanova's III Cavalry Corps he served in Samuel-François Lhéritier's 5th Heavy Cavalry Division.

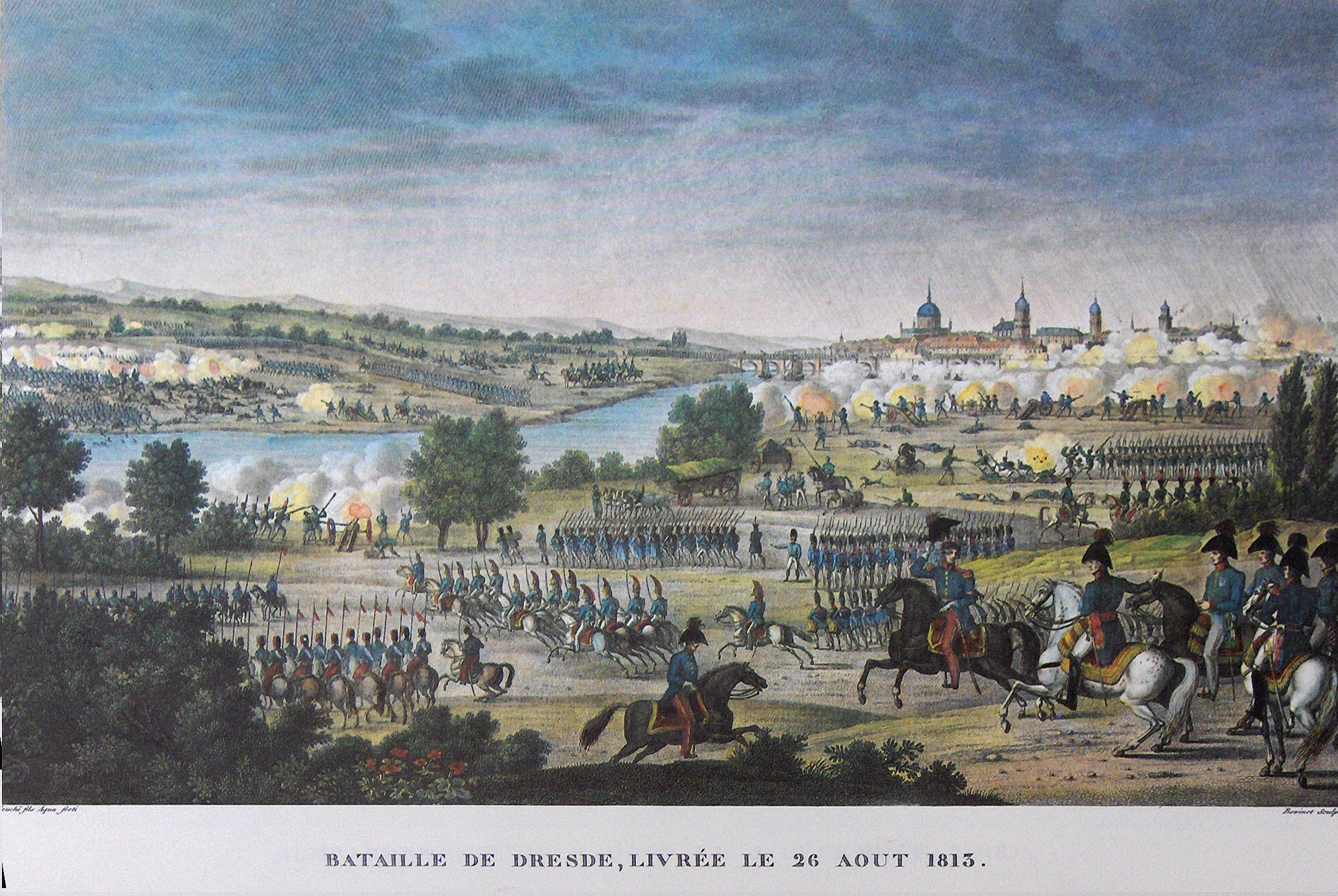
Battle of Dresden, 26–27 August 1813

On 10 August 1813 the 5th Heavy Cavalry Division was transferred to the V Cavalry Corps and from that day until 5 October Collaert was the acting division commander. During this period, he led the division at the Battle of Dresden on 26–27 August while Lhéritier led the corps. The division included the 2nd, 6th, 11th, 13th and 15th Dragoon Regiments and counted 61 officers and 851 troopers. During the Battle of Leipzig on 16–19 October, Collaert led one brigade in Lhéritier's 1,700-strong 5th Heavy Cavalry Division with Pierre Claude Pajol commanding the corps. Collaert's brigade was made up of four squadrons of the 11th Dragoons, two squadrons of the 13th Dragoons and three squadrons of the 15th Dragoons. (Note: The name was misspelled Collard.)

Formations of the Allied army of Karl Philipp, Prince of Schwarzenberg began crossing the Rhine River at Basel on 21 December 1813. In the lead was an Austro-Bavarian raiding force of 700 cavalrymen led by Karl von Scheibler. When he received news of the invasion, Marshal Claude Perrin Victor ordered Édouard Jean Baptiste Milhaud to take the 3,500 troopers of V Cavalry Corps and scout enemy movements. On 23 December, now reinforced with two regiments of Don Cossacks, Scheibler's force moved north through Mulhouse. Meanwhile, his 200-man spearhead captured 12 artillery caissons, reached Colmar, learned Milhaud's corps was due the next day and fell back to join the main force. On the morning of 24 December at Sainte-Croix-en-Plaine, Scheibler's 800 horsemen were routed by 1,000 French dragoons led by Gabriel-Gaspard Montélégier. As the Allies galloped to safety they found the two lead squadrons of Collaert's brigade blocking their escape route. Scheibler received three wounds but most of his force managed to cut its way out of the trap, suffering the loss of nine officers and about 200 troopers. French casualties were 80 but they recaptured the lost caissons. Though it was only a skirmish, Schwarzenberg became very cautious, believing that strong French forces were nearby. In fact, Schwarzenberg's 75,000 soldiers vastly outnumbered Victor's 10,000.

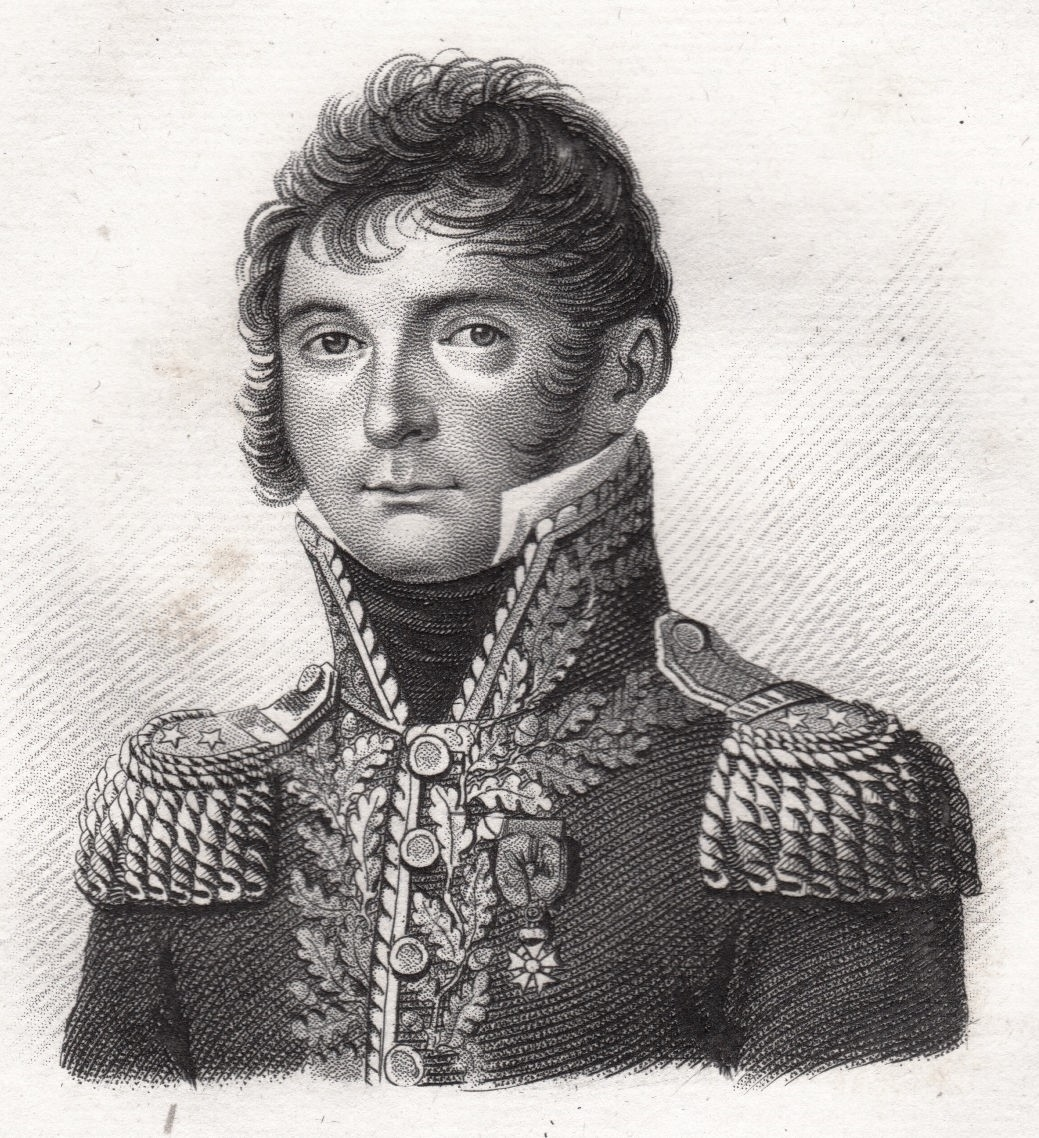
Samuel Lhéritier

On 25 March 1814, Collaert commanded the 5th Heavy Cavalry Division in Milhaud's cavalry corps. The division was made up of a 1,037-strong brigade that included the 2nd, 6th and 11th Dragoons and an 872-man brigade that counted the 13th and 15th Dragoons. He led a brigade consisting of the 22nd and 25th Dragoons in Lhéritier's 6th Heavy Cavalry Division during the Battle of La Rothière on 1 February 1814. Led by Gebhard Leberecht von Blücher, 80,000 Allies defeated Napoleon's 45,000 French troops. In response to the initial attack by Fabian Gottlieb von Osten-Sacken's Russian army corps, Lhéritier charged but was slowed by wet ground and stopped by intense artillery fire. After heavy fighting, the division was employed in covering the retreat of the French army.

At the Battle of Mormant on 17 February 1814, Napoleon's army encountered a Russian force of 2,500 infantry and 1,800 cavalry under Peter Petrovich Pahlen. The leading French formations arranged themselves into an arrow shape with Victor's infantry in the center. François Étienne de Kellermann led the right flank cavalry with the divisions of Lhéritier and Anne-François-Charles Trelliard while Milhaud led the left flank cavalry with the divisions of Hippolyte Piré and André Briche. Kellermann hurled Lhéritier's division at Pahlen's Cossacks while Trelliard went after the Russian infantry. Auguste Etienne Lamotte's brigade defeated two Cossack regiments, but when two more Cossack regiments appeared, Collaert's brigade charged and swept them away. Pahlen lost 2,114 infantry and one-third of his cavalry in the debacle. When the French cavalry pursuit reached Nangis it routed Anton Leonhard von Hardegg's Austrian division of the Allied V Corps. In the afternoon Lhéritier and Étienne Maurice Gérard's Paris Reserve combined to defeat the 3rd Bavarian Division in the combat of Valjouan. At this time there was a reorganization of the cavalry so that on 20 February 1814, Collaert became the commander of the 2nd Brigade of Lhéritier's 4th Heavy Cavalry Division in Milhaud's V Cavalry Corps. The 2nd Brigade consisted of 616 horsemen from the 22nd and 25th Dragoons.

The Battle of Saint-Dizier on 26 March 1814 was Napoleon's last victory, except for Ligny in 1815. Finding 10,000 Allied cavalry under Ferdinand von Wintzingerode drawn up in two lines west of Saint-Dizier, Napoleon crossed the Marne River and routed them, inflicting 1,500 casualties and capturing nine guns. While Trelliard's division pursued Wintzingerode's main body northeast toward Bar-le-Duc. Lhéritier's division chased Friedrich Karl von Tettenborn's Cossacks west to Perthes. In the last muster on 15 April, Collaert's brigade in Lhéritier's division still included the 22nd and 25th Dragoons and counted 46 officers and 517 rank and file. Under the Bourbon Restoration Collaert received the Order of Saint-Louis.

== Waterloo: 1815 ==
Collaert joined the army of the Kingdom of the Netherlands, being promoted major general on 26 March 1815 and appointed lieutenant general of the field army's cavalry division on 21 April. At the Battle of Waterloo on 18 June 1815, Collaert commanded the Dutch-Belgian Cavalry Division consisting of the 1st Brigade under Albert Dominicus Trip van Zoudtlandt, the 2nd Brigade led by Charles Étienne de Ghigny and the 3rd Brigade directed by Jean Baptiste van Merlen. The 1st Brigade was composed of the 1st, 2nd and 3rd Carabinier Regiments; the 2nd Brigade was made up of the 4th Light Dragoons and 8th Hussars; the 3rd Brigade comprised the 5th Light Dragoons and 6th Hussars. The 2nd, 5th and 8th Regiments were Belgian while the others were Dutch. The division was supported by the horse artillery half-batteries of Petter and Gey. The Carabiniers were considered heavy cavalry while the other four regiments were rated as light cavalry.

British accounts of the battle minimized the efforts of the Dutch-Belgian cavalry. One historian noted that the overall Allied cavalry commander Henry Paget, Earl of Uxbridge placed himself at the front of a Dutch cavalry unit and ordered a charge, but none of the horsemen followed him. Incidents like this one caused many British officers to brand all Dutch soldiers as cowards. The author pointed out that chain-of-command and language problems may have been the real culprits in this particular case. Only that morning the Prince William of Orange placed the Dutch-Belgian cavalry under Uxbridge's command. In fact, Dutch-Belgian cavalry losses were serious, with two regiments each losing more than 50 killed.

Dutch-Belgian Cavalry Division losses at Waterloo and Quatre Bras
Brigade	Regiment	Strength	Killed	Wounded	Missing	Total Losses
1st Brigade: Trip	1st Dutch Carabinier Regiment	446	12	75	15	102
1st Brigade: Trip	2nd Belgian Carabinier Regiment	399	58	68	30	156
1st Brigade: Trip	3rd Dutch Carabinier Regiment	392	37	29	26	92
2nd Brigade: Ghigny	4th Dutch Light Dragoon Regiment	647	54	143	52	239
2nd Brigade: Ghigny	8th Belgian Hussar Regiment	439	11	151	122	284
3rd Brigade: Merlen	5th Belgian Light Dragoon Regiment	441	10	76	71	157
3rd Brigade: Merlen	6th Dutch Hussar Regiment	641	12	70	132	214

The 1st Brigade was in reserve around noon but was sent into the fighting about 3:30 pm with the 1st Carabiniers leading. Because the 5th Light Dragoons were roughly handled by French Chasseurs à Cheval at the Battle of Quatre Bras on 16 June, they were held in reserve on 18 June. Recruited in November 1814, the 8th Hussar Regiment under Louis Duvivier was made up of raw soldiers of French, Belgian and German nationalities. During the struggle at Waterloo, the 8th found itself face-to-face with the elite French Guard Horse Grenadiers. After an order given in Dutch threw the 8th Hussars into confusion, they were charged and put to flight by the Horse Grenadiers. Enough troopers rallied to form a single squadron which cooperated with the brigades of Hussey Vivian and John Ormsby Vandeleur later in the afternoon.

At Waterloo, Collaert's foot was smashed by a musket ball. On 8 July 1815, he received the Military William Order. He was named commander of North Brabant province but died from the effects of his Waterloo wound on 17 June 1816 at Brussels.

== Notes ==
Footnotes

Citations
