= V Cavalry Corps (Grande Armée) =

- Active: 1813–1814
- Country: First French Empire
- Branch: French Imperial Army
- Type: Shock cavalry
- Size: Corps
- Engagements: War of the Sixth Coalition

Commanders
- Notable commanders: Samuel-François Lhéritier; Édouard Jean Baptiste Milhaud; Pierre Claude Pajol

The V Cavalry Corps of the Grande Armée was a French military unit that existed during the Napoleonic Wars. The corps was created in 1813 and fought until 1814. Emperor Napoleon Bonaparte first organized the corps during the summer armistice in 1813 and it fought at Dresden and Leipzig. General Samuel-François Lhéritier led the corps at first but was replaced by General Pierre Claude Pajol. After Pajol was wounded at Leipzig, General Édouard Jean Baptiste Milhaud commanded the corps at Hanau in 1813 and at Brienne, La Rothière, Mormant, Fère-Champenoise, and Paris in 1814.

== History ==
=== 1813 ===
After the disastrous invasion of Russia, Napoleon had to rebuild his armies in Germany. By 1 May 1813, the French emperor was ready to lead an army numbering 226,177 troops and 457 artillery pieces. However, his cavalry was its weakest element. Between mid-April and 1 May, it was organized into the I Cavalry Corps with 3,515 officers and men, the II Cavalry Corps with 3,293 sabers, and the III Cavalry Corps with 3,895 troopers. On 25 March, General Jean Antoine de Collaert was assigned to lead the 1st Brigade of General Samuel-François Lhéritier's 4th Cavalry Division in General Jean-Toussaint Arrighi de Casanova's III Cavalry Corps. After a reorganization, the division became part of the V Cavalry Corps on 10 August. From that day until 5 October, Collaert became the acting commander of the 5th Dragoon Division.

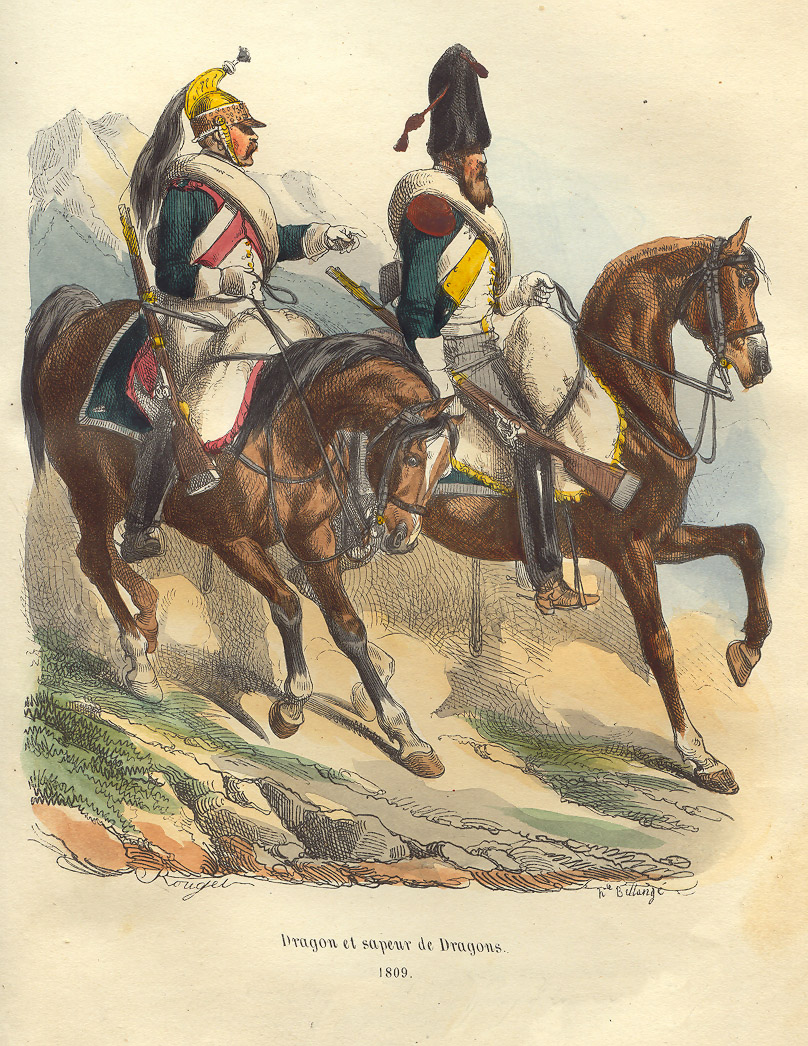
Two divisions of the V Cavalry Corps were made up of dragoons, as shown here.

By the time the summer armistice ended on 17 August 1813, Lhéritier commanded the V Cavalry Corps which numbered about 4,000 horsemen in 20 squadrons supported by 6 guns. In its initial disposition, Lhéritier's corps was posted near Dresden together with the XIV Corps under Marshal Laurent Gouvion Saint-Cyr. As the Allied Army of Bohemia advanced from the south, the V Cavalry Corps covered the left flank during Saint-Cyr's fighting withdrawal. On 25 August, Lhéritier lost 3 guns in a skirmish with Russian cavalry outside Dresden.

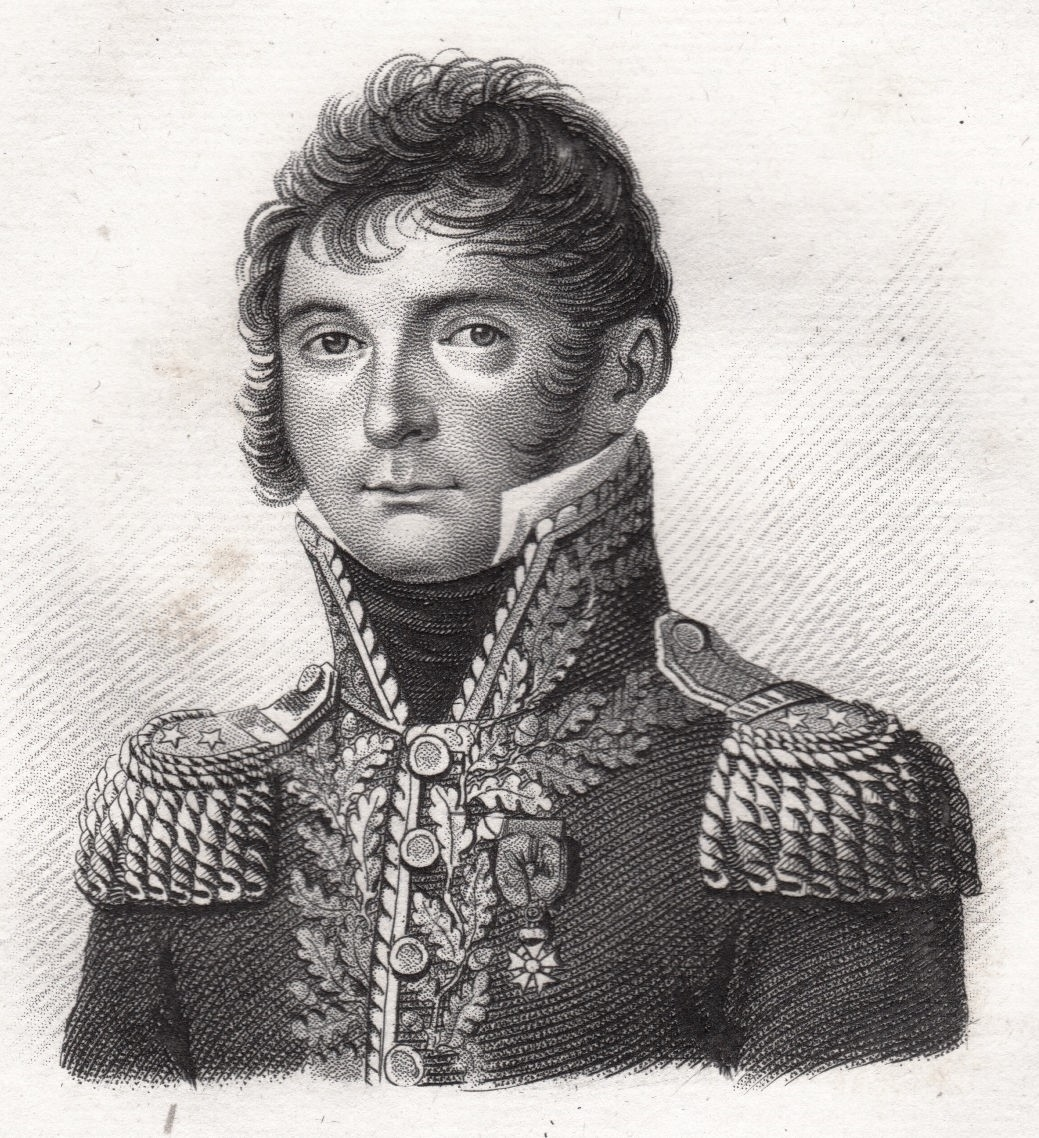
Samuel François Lhéritier

Lhéritier's corps was present during the Battle of Dresden on 26 and 27 August 1813. Its three divisions were led by Generals Stanislaw Klicki, Collaert, and Auguste Étienne Lamotte. Klicki led the 9th Light Cavalry Division, Collaert directed the 5th Dragoon Division, and Lamotte commanded the 6th Dragoon Division. Meanwhile, General Pierre Claude Pajol led the 10th Light Cavalry Division which belonged to Saint-Cyr's corps. Pajol's division counted 4 squadrons each of French, Italians, and Poles. On the 26th, Pajol appeared to have taken command of Lhéritier's corps as well as his own division because one authority stated that he controlled 46 cavalry squadrons while the commander of the I Cavalry Corps General Victor de Fay de La Tour-Maubourg directed 78 more. This mass of cavalry was deployed to the east of Dresden in the Friederichstadt suburb. Yet, the same source assigned only 68 squadrons to La Tour-Maubourg and Pajol for battle on the 27th. Beginning at 6:00 AM, the cavalry supported by Marshal Claude Perrin Victor's II Corps advanced against the outnumbered Austrian left wing. The attack was a complete success and by 2:00 PM, the Austrian defenders were almost annihilated, losing 15,000 prisoners. Of the V Cavalry Corps, only the 26th and 27th Chasseurs-à-Cheval and 19th Dragoon Regiments were engaged.

On 26 September 1813, the V Cavalry Corps, still under Lhéritier, was posted at Großenhain. On 2 October, the corps was placed under the orders of Marshal Joachim Murat along with the II, V, and VIII Corps. Murat was ordered to Freiberg to defend against another advance by the Army of Bohemia. On the 14th, Murat stood to fight south of Leipzig at the battle of Liebertwolkwitz with 32,400 infantry, 9,800 cavalry, and 156 guns. The contending forces included Murat's command plus the IV Cavalry Corps and one division of the I Cavalry Corps. The outcome was a drawn battle in which both sides held their positions. The V Cavalry Corps, now under the command of Pajol, was so badly "knocked about" that it was temporarily out of action.

At the Battle of Leipzig on 16–19 October, Pajol led 5,000 troopers and 11 guns in 3 divisions under Generals Jacques Gervais, baron Subervie, Lhéritier, and Édouard Jean Baptiste Milhaud. Subervie led the 9th Light Cavalry Division, Lhéritier directed the 5th Heavy Cavalry Division, and Milhaud commanded the 6th Heavy Cavalry Division. Early on the 16th, the I and V Cavalry Corps and the Imperial Guard cavalry were placed in reserve in the southern sector. On the 18th, the V Cavalry Corps supported the II Corps to the south of Leipzig. At 4:00 PM on 18 October, the I, III, and V Cavalry Corps were withdrawn from the battlefield. Pajol was among the many wounded and was replaced by Milhaud in command of the corps.

During the retreat after Leipzig, Milhaud and Lhéritier led the 15th and 18th Dragoons in action at Eckartsberga on 22 October. The French successfully parried an attempt by General Ignaz Gyulai's III Armeekorps to cut off their escape route. The 19th and 20th Dragoons and the 14th and 27th Chasseurs-à-Cheval from the V Cavalry Corps participated in the Battle of Hanau on 30–31 October. By late November, Milhaud's V Cavalry Corps covered the Left Bank of the Rhine from Mainz in the north to near Landau in the south. The corps numbered 3,973 horsemen of whom 300 patrolled the river every day between Mainz and Worms.

=== 1814 ===
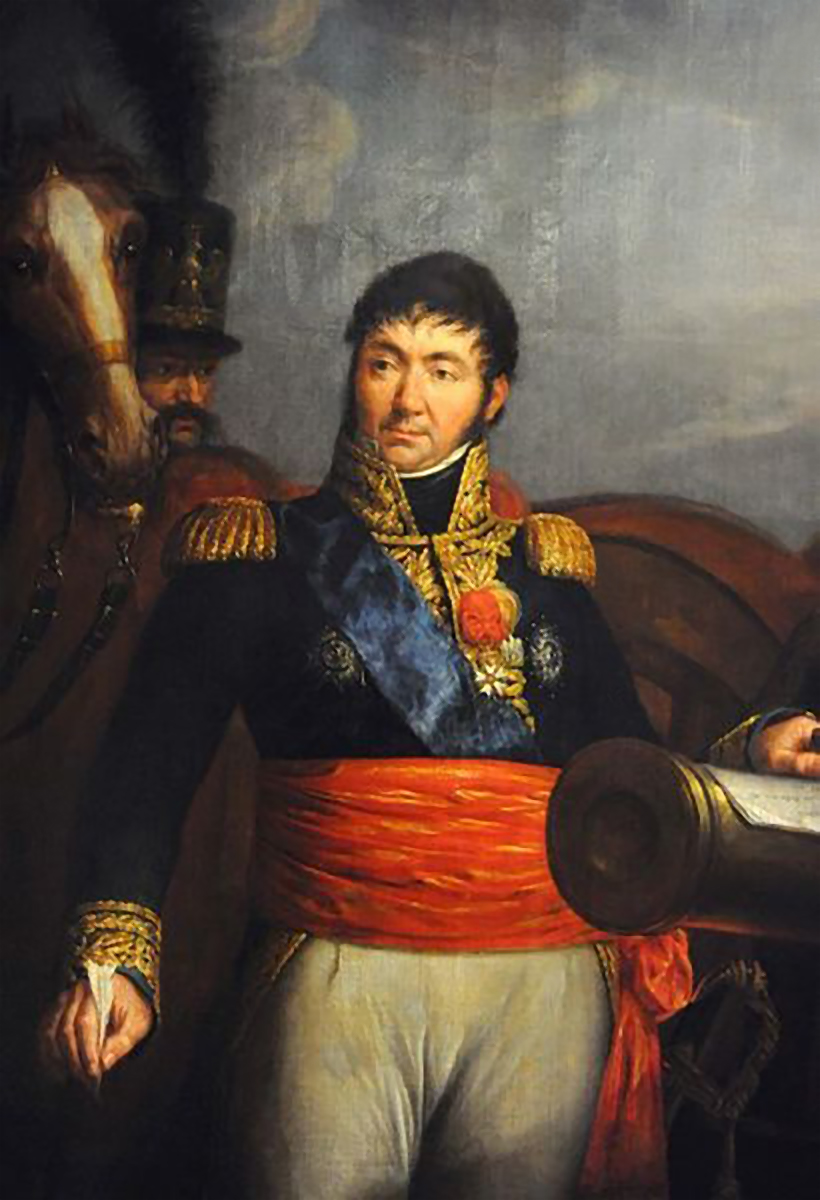
Édouard Milhaud

By the end of January 1814, Allied columns brushed aside the weak forces defending the borders and invaded France. Napoleon resolved to move against them with the Imperial Guard, II and VI Corps, and the I and V Cavalry Corps, a total of 33,000 infantry and 8,000 cavalry. In a clash at Saint-Dizier on 27 January, 2,100 troopers belonging to Milhaud's cavalry defeated 1,500 men of the Russian 2nd Hussar Division. The French units involved in the skirmish were the 5th Chevau-Léger Lancers, the 10th and 26th Chasseurs-à-Cheval, and the 2nd, 11th, 13th, and 19th Dragoons. At the Battle of Brienne on 29 January, the V Cavalry Corps led the attack. In overall command of the cavalry, General Emmanuel de Grouchy placed General Hippolyte Piré with the light cavalry division on the left, Lhéritier's dragoons in the center, and some Imperial Guard cavalry on the right. Before 3:00 PM, the horsemen swept forward, driving back General Pyotr Pahlen's Russian cavalry. In their pursuit, the dragoon divisions of Lhéritier and General André Louis Briche came across three Russian battalions in square formations and were repulsed. The cavalry was then shifted to cover the French right flank during the remainder of the battle. The corps also fought at the Battle of La Rothière on 1 February. Late in the day, Napoleon threw in Milhaud's corps to cover the disengagement of his outnumbered and defeated army.

On 6 February 1814, Marshal Jacques MacDonald reported that his cavalry was in a bad state. He wrote that the V Cavalry Corps numbered 800 sabers which was half their nominal strength. The III Cavalry Corps numbered only 500 while the II Cavalry Corps had between 800 and 900 troopers. On the 10th, the III and V Cavalry Corps and General Antoine-Louis Decrest de Saint-Germain massed at Meaux to cover a river crossing. The combined force was 2,000 horsemen and 5 guns. Milhaud led the divisions of Piré and Briche at the Battle of Mormant on 17 February. At this time, Lhéritier's division was transferred to the newly formed VI Cavalry Corps. Milhaud's V Cavalry Corps participated in the Battle of Fère-Champenoise on 25 March, including the 23rd Chasseurs-à-Cheval and the 5th, 6th, 21st, 25th, and 26th Dragoons. The 6th Dragoon Division fought under the command of General Nicolas-François Roussel d'Hurbal at the Battle of Paris on 30 March.

== Order of battle ==
=== Leipzig, 1813 ===
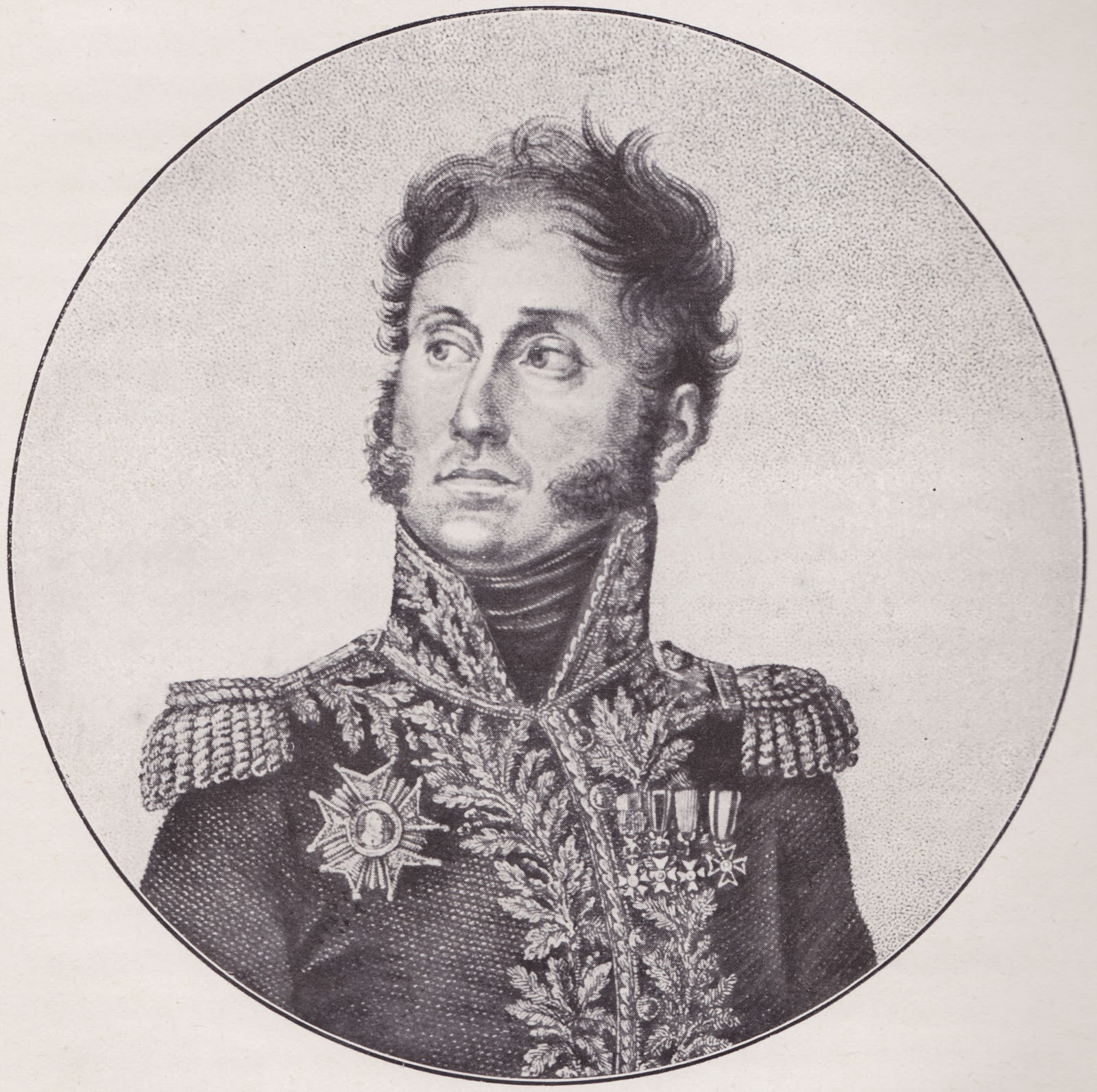
Pierre Claude Pajol

V Cavalry Corps: General of Division Pierre Claude Pajol (5,000)

- 9th Light Cavalry Division: General of Division Jacques Gervais, baron Subervie (1,700)
  - 32nd Light Cavalry Brigade: General of Brigade Stanislaw Klicki
    - 3rd Hussar Regiment (3 squadrons)
    - 27th Chasseurs-à-Cheval Regiment (4 squadrons)
  - 33rd Light Cavalry Brigade: General of Brigade Jacques Laurent Vial
    - 13th Hussar Regiment (4 squadrons)
    - 14th Chasseurs-à-Cheval Regiment (3 squadrons)
    - 26th Chasseurs-à-Cheval Regiment (3 squadrons)
- 5th Heavy Cavalry Division: General of Division Samuel-François Lhéritier (1,700)
  - Heavy Cavalry Brigade: General of Brigade Mathieu Queunot
    - 2nd Dragoon Regiment (3 squadrons)
    - 6th Dragoon Regiment (4 squadrons)
  - Heavy Cavalry Brigade: General of Brigade Jean Antoine de Collaert
    - 11th Dragoon Regiment (4 squadrons)
    - 13th Dragoon Regiment (2 squadrons)
    - 15th Dragoon Regiment (3 squadrons)
- 6th Heavy Cavalry Division: General of Division Édouard Jean Baptiste Milhaud (1,600)
  - Heavy Cavalry Brigade: General of Brigade Auguste Étienne Lamotte
    - 18th Dragoon Regiment (2 squadrons)
    - 19th Dragoon Regiment (2 squadrons)
    - 20th Dragoon Regiment (3 squadrons)
  - Heavy Cavalry Brigade: General of Brigade Gabriel Gaspard Montelegier
    - 22nd Dragoon Regiment (3 squadrons)
    - 25th Dragoon Regiment (4 squadrons)
- Corps Artillery:
  - Horse artillery (11 guns)

Sources:

- Smith, Digby (1998). The Napoleonic Wars Data Book. London: Greenhill. p. 463. ISBN 1-85367-276-9.
- "French Order of Battle at Leipzig". The Napoleon Series. 2004.
