= Battle of St-Dizier =

Battle of St-Dizier may refer to:

- Battle of Saint-Dizier (January 1814) or First battle of Saint-Dizier, Franco-Russian battle on 26 or 27 January 1814, Édouard Jean Baptiste Milhaud defeating Sergey Nikolaevich Lanskoy
- Battle of Saint-Dizier or Second battle of Saint-Dizier, Franco-Russian battle on 26 March 1814, Napoleon defeating Ferdinand von Wintzingerode

== See also ==
- Campaign in north-east France (1814)
- War of the Sixth Coalition
