= Charles Étienne de Ghigny =

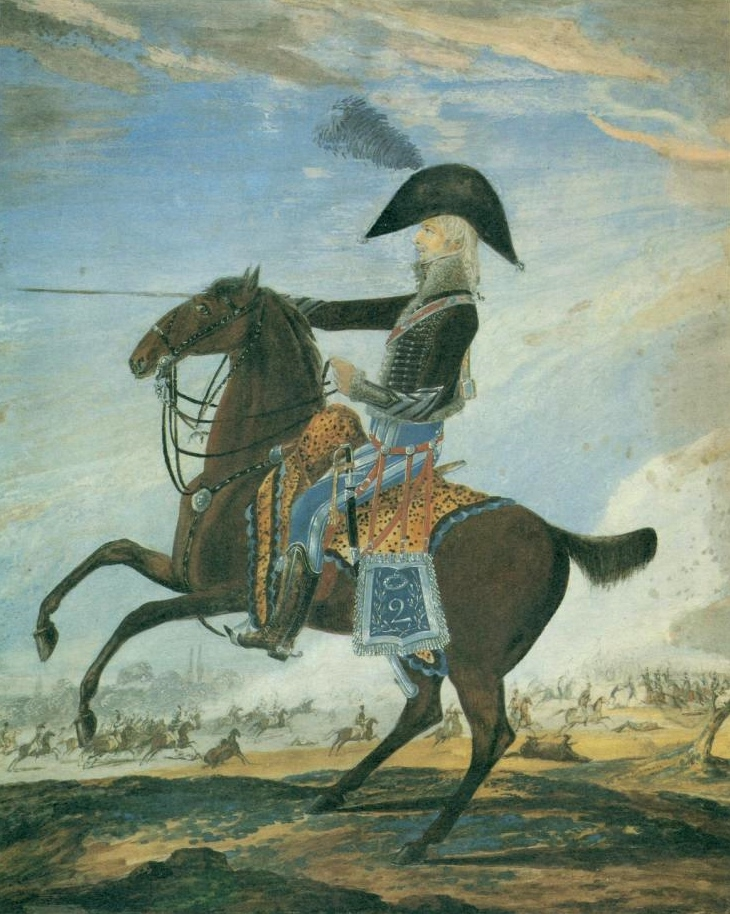
- Charles Étienne de Ghigny as a squadron leader of the 2nd French Hussars, 1803.
- Born: 14 January 1771; Brussels, Austrian Netherlands
- Died: 1 December 1844 (aged 73)
- Allegiance: France; Netherlands; Belgium
- Branch: Cavalry
- Service years: (France) 1792–1814 (Netherlands) 1815–1831 (Belgium) 1831–1837
- Rank: (France) Colonel (Netherlands) Lieutenant General (Belgium) Lieutenant General
- Conflicts: War of the First Coalition; War of the Fifth Coalition; Battle of Wagram; Peninsular War; War of the Sixth Coalition; Invasion of Russia; German campaign; Battle of Fère-Champenoise; Battle of Paris; Hundred Days; Battle of Waterloo
- Awards: Légion d'Honneur, CC, 1814; Order of Saint Louis, 1814; Military William Order, 1815; Order of Leopold, 1837
- Other work: Baron of the Empire, 1813

Charles Étienne de Ghigny (14 January 1771 – 1 December 1844) commanded a Kingdom of the Netherlands light cavalry brigade at the Battle of Waterloo. He joined a French light cavalry regiment in 1792 and served in the same regiment for 22 years, becoming its lieutenant colonel in 1806. He fought in the Peninsular War in 1810–1811 and in the latter year became colonel of the regiment. He fought in the 1812 French invasion of Russia, the 1813 German Campaign and the 1814 French Campaign. In 1814 he led a cavalry regiment at Fère-Champenoise and Paris. He changed his allegiance to the Netherlands in 1815 and was appointed major general. He was promoted to lieutenant general in 1826. He switched allegiance to the Kingdom of Belgium in 1831 and received the Order of Leopold in 1837.

== French Revolution ==
On 14 January 1771, Ghigny was born in Brussels of parents Étienne Ghigny and Maria Segers. In 1792 he joined the French 12th Chasseurs à Cheval Regiment, becoming a second lieutenant on 5 September 1792, a first lieutenant on 28 July 1795 and a captain on 1 October 1795. The battle honors of the 12th Chasseurs include the battles of Valmy and Jemappes in 1792, the Battle of Neerwinden in 1793, the battles of Charleroi (Lambusart) and Fleurus in 1794, the Crossing of the Rhine in 1795, the battles of Amberg and Limburg in 1796 and the Battle of Neuwied in 1797. There is no specific mention of Ghigny in these actions, only that the regiment was recognized. During the Wars of the French Revolution Ghigny fought with the Army of the North, Army of Sambre-et-Meuse and Army of the Rhine.

At Valmy, the 12th Chasseurs à Cheval were in Arthur Dillon's advance guard of the Army of the North. At Jemappes the regiment formed part of Pierre de Ruel, marquis de Beurnonville's Right Wing advance guard. It also fought at Aldenhoven in 1793. On 4 May 1794, the regiment was in Jacques Fromentin's division, part of Jacques Desjardin's Right Wing of the Army of the North. As part of the French strategy for the spring of 1794, Desjardins' Right Wing joined with Louis Charbonnier's Army of the Ardennes to form the 60,000-man right prong of a two-prong stroke against the Coalition. Between 11 May and 3 June this force crossed the Sambre River three times and was driven back each time. The three events were the battles of Grandreng on 13 May, Erquelinnes on 24 May and Gosselies on 3 June. After the latter defeat, Jean-Baptiste Jourdan brought reinforcements from the Army of the Moselle and took command of the combined force which henceforth became known as Army of Sambre-et-Meuse. On 16 June the French were beaten again at Charleroi. The Battle of Fleurus was fought on 26 June. Though it was not immediately realized, the subsequent Coalition retreat meant that Fleurus was the decisive battle of the Flanders Campaign.

In the 1795 campaign, the 12th Chasseurs were part of Jacques Louis François Delaistre de Tilly's 9,861-strong division. The following year, the regiment was in Jean Etienne Championnet's division, whose rear guard was led by Louis Klein at Amberg on 24 August 1796. The division also fought at the Battle of Würzburg on 3 September and Limburg on 16 September.

In 1799 the 12th Chasseurs were engaged near St. Luzisteig Pass in Switzerland. In 1800, the regiment fought at the battles of Stockach and Messkirch. The 12th Chasseurs were part of Étienne Marie Antoine Champion de Nansouty's division of Claude Lecourbe's Right Wing in the army of Jean Victor Marie Moreau. In mid-campaign the regiment was quickly transferred to Italy where it fought at the Battle of Marengo on 14 June. In this action, the 12th Chasseurs belonged to Bernard Duvignau's brigade when that general fled the field. The regiment was later sent to protect the army's southern flank.

== Empire ==
Ghigny was promoted to major on 29 October 1803 and named a Chevalier of the Légion d'Honneur on 15 June 1804. The 12th Chasseurs à Cheval fought at the Battle of Austerlitz in 1805 and at the Battle of Auerstadt in 1806. In the latter action the regiment was brigaded with the 1st and 2nd Chasseurs à Cheval in the III Corps under Marshal Louis-Nicolas Davout. Ghigny was appointed lieutenant colonel on 23 October 1806. The battle honors of the 12th Chasseurs also include the battles of Czarnowo and Golymin in 1806 and the Battle of Heilsberg in 1807.

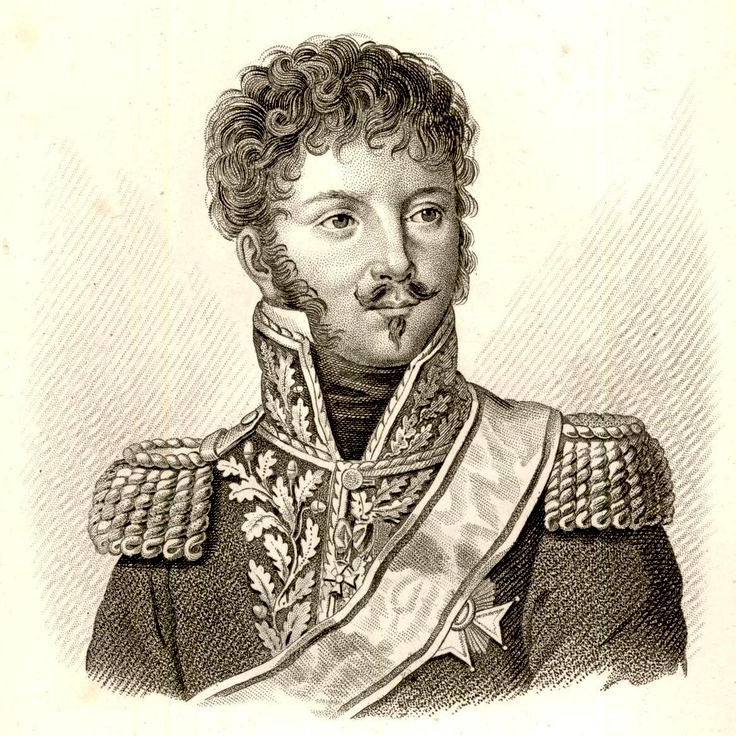
Louis Montbrun

At the start of the War of the Fifth Coalition in 1809, the 1st, 2nd and 12th Chasseurs à Cheval were in Charles Claude Jacquinot's brigade in Louis-Pierre Montbrun's Light Cavalry Division in Davout's III Corps. The 12th Chasseurs counted 773 cavalrymen. Jacquinot's brigade was detached from Davout and added to a provisional corps led by Marshal Jean Lannes. On 20 April 1809, the force under Lannes drove the Austrian left wing back 10 miles (16 km) in the Battle of Abensberg. In 1809, the battle honors of the regiment include the battles of Eckmühl, Ratisbon and Wagram. At Wagram the 12th Chasseurs were part of Pierre Claude Pajol's brigade in III Corps. On 6 July a massive cavalry fight took place on the right flank. After Montbrun's division was pressed back, Pajol's brigade charged into the melee to stop the Austrians. Finally, Emmanuel Grouchy's dragoon division routed the Austrian horsemen, allowing Davout's infantry to resume its advance.

Ghigny fought in the Peninsular War in Spain during 1810–1811. At the Battle of Fuentes de Oñoro on 3–5 May 1811, the 12th Chasseurs were in Pierre Watier's cavalry brigade with a strength of nine officers and 172 troopers. Having driven Marshal André Masséna's French army out of Portugal, the British army under Arthur Wellesley, Viscount Wellington began the Blockade of Almeida. Before advancing to the relief of Almeida, Masséna's army absorbed large numbers of infantry replacements into its depleted ranks, but the cavalry and artillery were very weak due to heavy losses of horses in Portugal. Marshal Jean-Baptiste Bessières reinforced Masséna with 30 artillery gun teams and two weak cavalry brigades, including Watier's, that counted 1,700 horsemen at most. On 5 May Watier's brigade was committed to the cavalry action against the British 7th Division, but the British made an orderly retreat with only two battalions being roughly handled. Ghigny was promoted to colonel of the 12th Chasseurs on 11 October 1811.

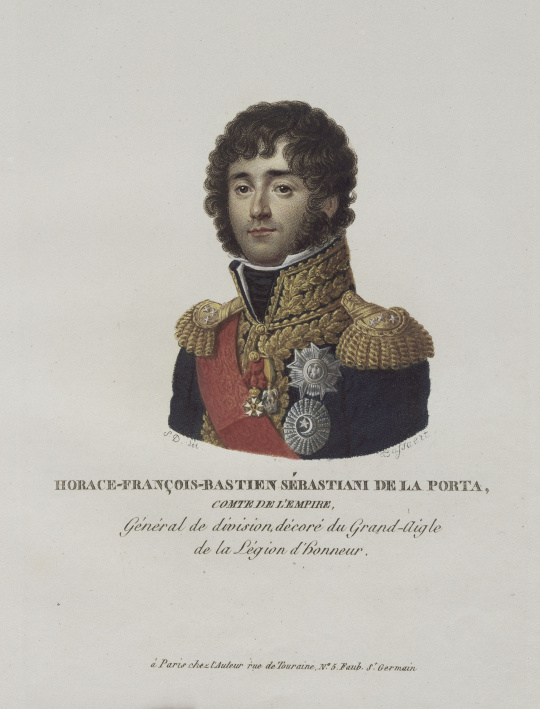
Horace Sebastiani

Ghigny led the 12th Chasseurs Regiment in the 1812 French invasion of Russia. He was wounded on 8 August in a successful clash between a 6,500-man Franco-Austrian force and the Russians. On 7 September, his regiment participated in the Battle of Borodino as part of Horace Sebastiani's 2nd Light Cavalry Division, part of the II Cavalry Corps. Ghigny was wounded again on 18 October in the Battle of Tarutino (Vinkovo). The regiment's war record also included the Battle of Krasnoi on 14–18 November.

In 1813 Ghigny led his regiment during the German Campaign. At the Battle of Katzbach on 26 August, the 12th Chasseurs were still in the 2nd Light Cavalry Division, which was led by Nicolas-François Roussel d'Hurbal, and the II Cavalry Corps, now under Sebastiani. The regiment was engaged at the Battle of Leipzig on 16–19 October as part of the 7th Light Cavalry Brigade in Roussel d'Hurbal's division. In 1813, Ghigny was awarded the Officer's Cross of the Légion d'Honneur and named a Baron of the Empire in 1813. For his service during the retreat from Germany, received the Commander's Cross of the Légion d'Honneur in 1814.

During the Campaign in Northeast France, Ghigny appeared at Arcis-sur-Aube on 27 February 1814 leading a cavalry march regiment. Together with Roussel d'Hurbal's cavalry division and part of Pierre François Joseph Boyer's 9th Infantry Division, Ghigny's regiment was attached to the command of Marshal Michel Ney. March regiments were used to move soldiers of different units from the depots to the fighting front because they minimized desertion. They were not intended as permanent formations and were infrequently used in combat. A 17 March order of battle showed that Ghigny's 320-man march regiment was attached to Roussel d'Hurbal's 6th Heavy Cavalry Division in Marshal Édouard Mortier, duc de Trévise's Imperial Guard corps.

At the Battle of Fere-Champenoise on 25 March, Roussel d'Hurbal and Ghigny were commanded by Augustin Daniel Belliard in Mortier's corps. After the Allied cavalry attacked Marshal Auguste de Marmont's force early in the morning, Mortier marched to join his colleague. Ghigny was posted facing east on the far left flank to watch a body of 1,000 Russian Cossacks. When the Russian cavalry threatened to turn the left flank, Ghigny was pulled back behind a stream, facing northeast. As more and more Allied cavalry appeared, the French marshals began to withdraw. Early in the afternoon the French right flank cavalry drove off a major attack, but the left flank cavalry suffered a setback. At 2:00 pm while the French troops were crossing a streambed, a powerful rainstorm struck, blinding them and wetting their gunpowder. The Allied cavalry charged, drove off the French cavalry and got among the infantry, breaking some squares and capturing most of the artillery. The marshals eventually rallied their troops, thanks to the fortuitous arrival of another march regiment, but French losses were heavy.

In the Battle of Paris on 30 March the Allied armies deployed about 100,000 troops after subtracting 30,000 men in a covering force. Against the Allies, Marmont and Mortier could only field 19,961 infantry and 5,565 cavalry plus 12,000 skittish National Guards. Belliard's cavalry guarded the left flank. While the two marshals were heavily engaged, an Allied army corps under Louis Alexandre Andrault de Langeron approached Belliard's positions. After a French cavalry charge was repulsed, Langeron ordered his artillery to bombard Belliard's troopers. The badly outmatched French cavalry, including Ghigny's and two other march regiments rapidly retreated up the Montmartre Heights. The nearby National Guards abandoned their positions and fled. A cease fire agreement soon ended the fighting. Later in 1814 Ghigny received the Order of Saint Louis from King Louis XVIII.

== Dutch and Belgian service ==
In 1815 Ghigny joined the Dutch army and was promoted major general on 21 April. At the Battle of Waterloo on 18 June he led the 2nd Cavalry Brigade in Jean Antoine de Collaert's Dutch-Belgian Cavalry Division. The brigade was made up of the 4th (Dutch) Light Dragoon and the 8th (Belgian) Hussar Regiments. After the 1st Brigade of Pierre François Joseph Durutte's French division was broken by British dragoons, Ghigny's brigade advanced downhill from the ridge. Durutte's routed brigade fled behind an infantry square from the VI Corps which Ghigny's horsemen charged without success. British officers branded the Dutch-Belgian cavalry as cowards based on an incident later recalled by Henry Paget, Earl of Uxbridge. In fact, casualties were heavy. At Waterloo, the 4th Light Dragoons lost 54 killed, 143 wounded and 52 missing while the 8th Hussars lost 11 killed, 151 wounded and 122 missing. The 4th Regiment started the day with 647 cavalrymen and the 8th had 439.

Ghigny was awarded the Military William Order 3rd Class on 8 July 1815. He was promoted to lieutenant general on 26 October 1826. During the Belgian Revolution he was in command at Ghent, which he declared in a state of siege. Soon after, he was placed on the inactive list and he received an honorable discharge from the Dutch Army on 31 December 1830. Ghigny entered Belgian service as a lieutenant general on 15 February 1831. He received the Belgian Order of Leopold on 9 July 1837 for meritorious service. He died on either 1 December or 30 November 1844. A sepia print from the 1800s shows Ghigny in a dark military coat with epaulettes and a single row of buttons on the front. He is thin in appearance with large eyes, a small mouth, a small toothbrush moustache and a full head of hair.
