= Stanisław Klicki =

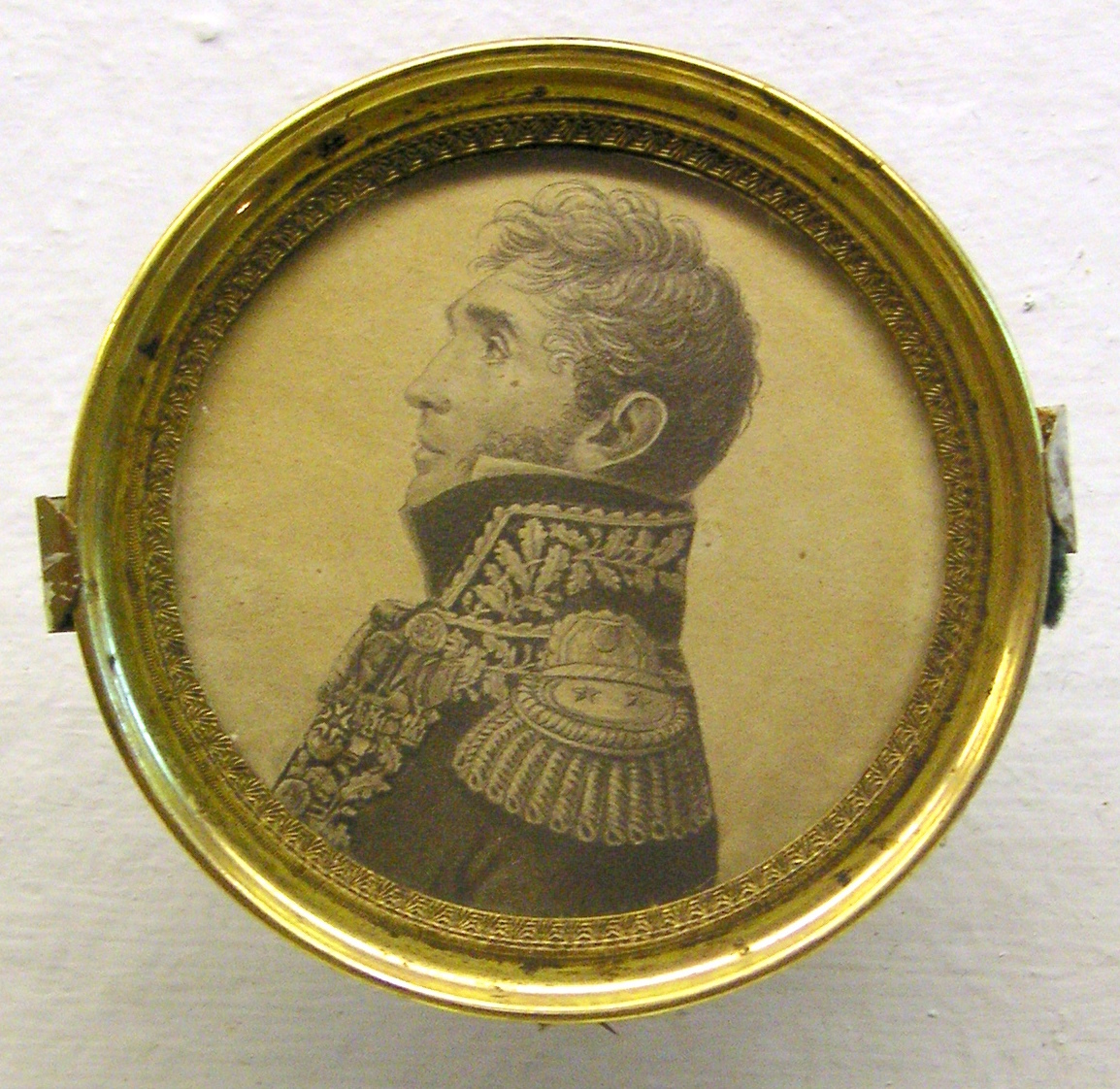
Stanisław Klicki miniature, ca. 1847

Stanisław Klicki of Prus (1775–1847) was a Polish military commander, aristocrat and a general of the Polish forces. For his service during the Napoleonic Wars, he was made a baron of the French Empire by Napoleon Bonaparte. During the November Uprising he commanded all Polish forces on the left bank of the Vistula River.

== Life ==
Born to a lesser szlachta family using the Prus coat of arms, Klicki started his military career in 1791, joining the ranks of the National Cavalry. He fought with distinction in the War of the Constitution. A skilled cavalryman, during the Kościuszko's Uprising of 1794 he became the governor of National Cavalry under Tadeusz Kościuszko. For his valour shown in the battles of Ostrołęka and Łasia, he was promoted to the rank of Captain of Cavalry. Soon afterwards he was attached to Gen. Zieliński. After the fall of the uprising he was forced to leave the country and settled in Italy.

There in 1797 he joined the Polish Legions in Italy and fought under command of Gen. Jan Henryk Dąbrowski. Klicki took part in the battles of Legnano, Castel Nuovo, Castel Franco and the battle of Naples. During the siege of Mantua in 1799 he was taken prisoner by the Austrians, but was released soon afterwards and returned to his unit. Promoted to the rank of Major, he became a commanding officer of the 5th Battalion. Soon afterwards, in 1800, he left the infantry and was among the first officers to be accepted in the newly formed 1st Uhlans' Regiment of the Legion.

During the Napoleonic Wars he fought with distinction in several campaigns. During the war against Prussia he took part in the battles of Świdnica, Glogau and Neisse. On 1 July 1807 he was again promoted, this time to the rank of podpułkownik (lieutenant colonel). In that rank he joined the Vistulan Legion and became the commander of the cavalry of that unit. With his men he took part in the Peninsular War and fought in the battles of Mallen, Alagon, Epila and Tudela. In the summer of 1808 he fought in the First Siege of Saragossa. Following the Siege of Valencia he was awarded by Marshal Louis Gabriel Suchet with a private audience with Napoleon Bonaparte. The Emperor granted him a yearly reward of 2000 francs and a promotion to colonel. Considered a hero, in 1812 Klicki was made a Baron of the Empire.

During the French invasion of Russia Klicki returned to front-line service and fought at battles of Smolensk, Vitebsk, Mozhaysk and Maloyaroslavets. During the retreat he was among the most successful commanders of the fleeing armies and managed to save almost all of his 4000 men, including viceroy of Italy Eugene Beauharnais. He found his way to Vilna, which he attempted to defend against the pursuing Russians. However, his attempt failed and Klicki retreated with his units further westwards. He then fought in the Saxon Campaign (at Köppen, Motzern, Dresden, Magdeburg and Möchern). On 22 July 1813 he was promoted to the rank of brigadier general and became the commanding officer of the 32nd Light Cavalry Brigade of the V Cavalry Corps under General Édouard Jean-Baptiste Milhaud. He led his brigade in the Battle of Leipzig in October 1813. He moved to France and fought in the Battle of Arcis-sur-Aube in 1814. However, the abdication of Napoleon stopped his military career in the French forces.

He resigned his post and returned to Congress Poland, where he joined the army and became the commanding officer of the 2nd Brigade of Mounted Rifles. In 1817 he was nominated the commanding officer of the entire division, but for unknown reasons the document was handed to him only in 1826. He set up his staff in Łowicz. There he greeted the outbreak of the November Uprising. Together with his division he arrived to Warsaw and subordinated himself to the Provisional Government and General Józef Chłopicki. Following the latter's resignation, Klicki briefly served as a deputy Commander-in-Chief, and since 18 December 1830 was a member of the War Council. As his support for the uprising was weak and his health was failing, in 1831 he resigned his post and was allowed to leave Poland for Bavaria, where he intended to settle. However, on crossing the Austrian border he was arrested and handed over to the Russians, who imprisoned him and resettled to Kostroma. Released in 1836, he spent the rest of his life in sanatoria. Stanisław Klicki died on 23 April 1847 in Rome and was buried at the Campo Verano cemetery.

== See also ==
- History of Poland (1795–1918)
