= Samuel-François Lhéritier =

French General during the French Revolutionary Wars and Napoleonic Wars (1772–1829)

Général de Division Samuel-François Lhéritier de Chézelles Baron of the Empire
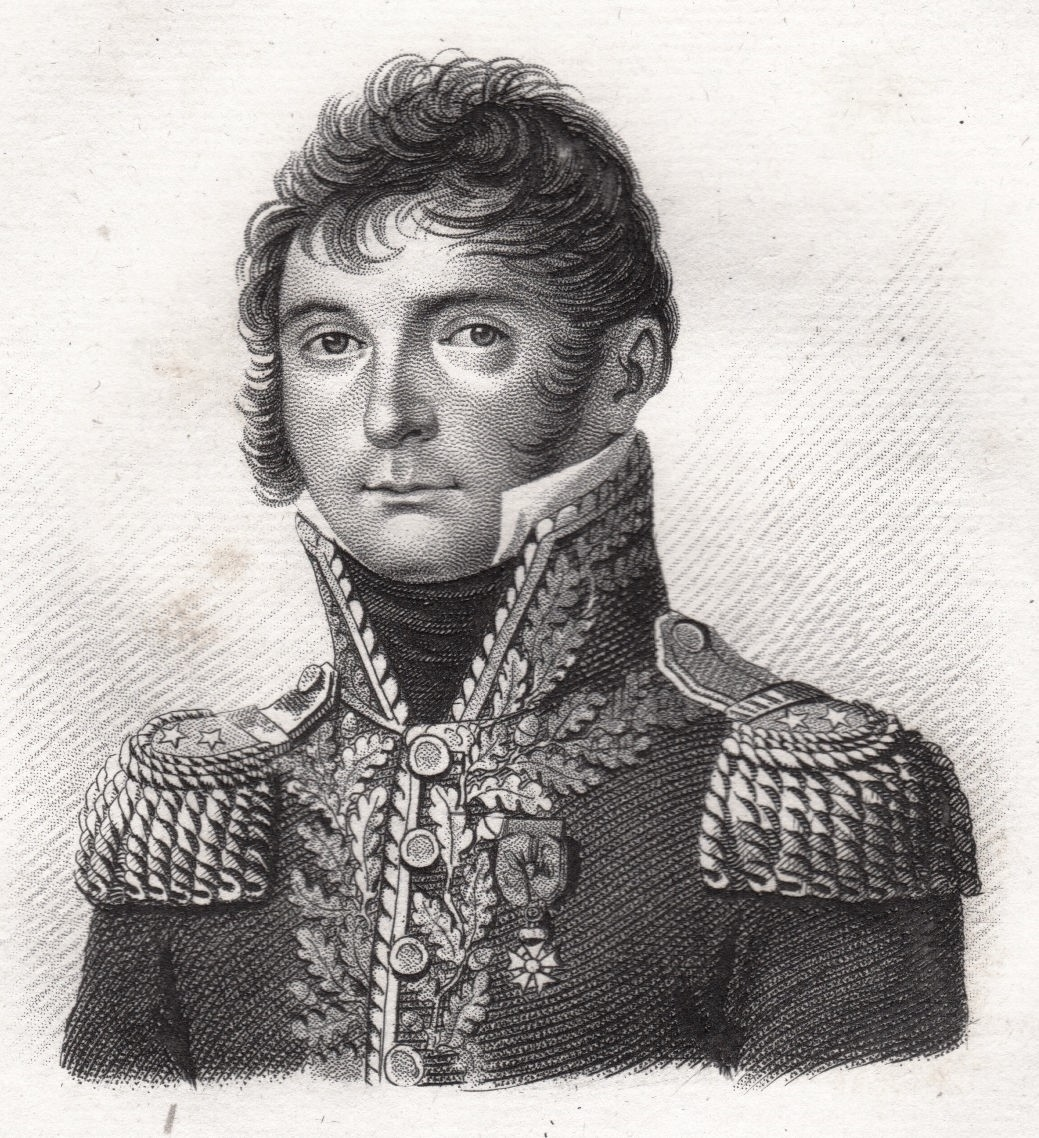
- General Baron Samuel-François Lhéritier
- Born: 6 August 1772; Angles-sur-l'Anglin, Poitou, France
- Died: 23 August 1829 (aged 57); Conflans-Sainte-Honorine, Seine-et-Oise, France
- Military career
- Allegiance: (France) French First Republic, (France) First French Empire, Bourbon Restoration
- Branch: Cavalry
- Service years: 1792–1815
- Rank: Général de Division
- Conflicts: French Revolutionary Wars; Napoleonic Wars
- Awards: Commandeur de la Légion d'honneur Baron of the Empire (1808)
- Other work: Inspector General of Cavalry; Inspector General of Gendarmerie

Baron Samuel-François Lhéritier de Chézelles (French pronunciation: [samɥɛl fʁɑ̃swa leʁitje də ʃezɛl]; 6 August 1772 – 23 August 1829) was a French soldier who rose through the ranks during the French Revolutionary Wars and Napoleonic Wars, eventually gaining promotion to the military rank of Général de Division.

While his initial career in the infantry branch and then general staff during the French Revolutionary Wars was unremarkable, Lhéritier made a name for himself as a cavalry commander during the Napoleonic Wars. A gallant officer, he led from the front and, as a result, collected a number of serious battle wounds. He was created a baron of the Empire and a Commander of the Legion of Honour and his name is inscribed under the Arc de Triomphe in Paris.

Having begun his military career in 1792, he joined the cavalry branch on a permanent basis in 1803 and subsequently saw steady promotion and was given various commands of heavy cavalry units. A part of the Grande Armée in 1805, he took part in the War of the Third Coalition. In 1806, at the outbreak of the War of the Fourth Coalition, Lhéritier was promoted to colonel and given the command of the 10th Cuirassiers. In this capacity, he was noted for his brave charge at the Battle of Eylau in 1807. Two years later, during the War of the Fifth Coalition, he made an impression on his superiors, especially during the Battle of Aspern-Essling and Battle of Znaim. As a result, he was promoted to brigadier general and given the command of a cuirassier brigade, before taking part to the French invasion of Russia in 1812. The next year, he was promoted to general of division and was given various commands during the War of the Sixth Coalition. During the 1815 War of the Seventh Coalition, Baron Lhéritier commanded a mixed dragoon and cuirassier division, at the head of which he charged during the Battle of Waterloo. Lhéritier's active service effectively ended soon after Napoleon I's second abdication, but he did hold two significant military functions during the Second Restoration.

== Revolutionary Wars ==
Born in Angles-sur-l'Anglin on 6 August 1772, Lhéritier joined the army on 26 September 1792, aged 20 and he would spend his first years of service fighting in the French Revolutionary Wars, with action taking place mainly on the Rhine. Upon joining the army, he was at first commissioned as a mere grenadier in the 3rd Indre-et-Loire battalion, before being promoted to Corporal, in command of the battalion's grenadiers (22 December 1792). The next year, on 18 August 1793, he was appointed secretary to the general staff of the Army of the Rhine and then provisional deputy of the general adjutants of the army, with the rank of sub-lieutenant of infantry (17 May 1794), his first junior officer rank. His rank as sub-lieutenant was at first provisional and was only rendered permanent two and a half years later, on 4 December 1796. On 2 January 1797, he was appointed aide-de-camp to General Jacques Nicolas Bellavène and saw rapid promotion, first to lieutenant on 3 April 1797 and then to captain on 5 October 1797. With his second promotion came a new general staff position, this time with General Jean Boudet's command.

On 14 June 1800, Captain Lhéritier fought at the decisive Battle of Marengo, where he collected a severe thigh wound. Six weeks after the battle, on 28 July 1800, he was transferred from the general staff to the cavalry branch of the army and was attached to the 6th Dragoons. Completely healed from his injury on 23 October of that year, he was detached from his regiment and, from November reassumed staff duties, as aide-de-camp to General Jean Ambroise Baston de Lariboisière. However, he soon moved back to cavalry, as, on 19 September 1801 he was promoted to Squadron Commander in the 9th Cavalry. Following the various reforms of the cavalry branch during this period of peace, Lhéritier was again commissioned aide-de-camp on 16 December 1801, a position that he held until 26 August 1803, when he was decommissioned. He resumed service a few months later, on 13 October 1803 and on 15 December of that year, he was given a position in the 11th Cuirassiers, a regiment that had been created in 1803 from what used to be the 11th Cavalry.

== Early Napoleonic Wars ==
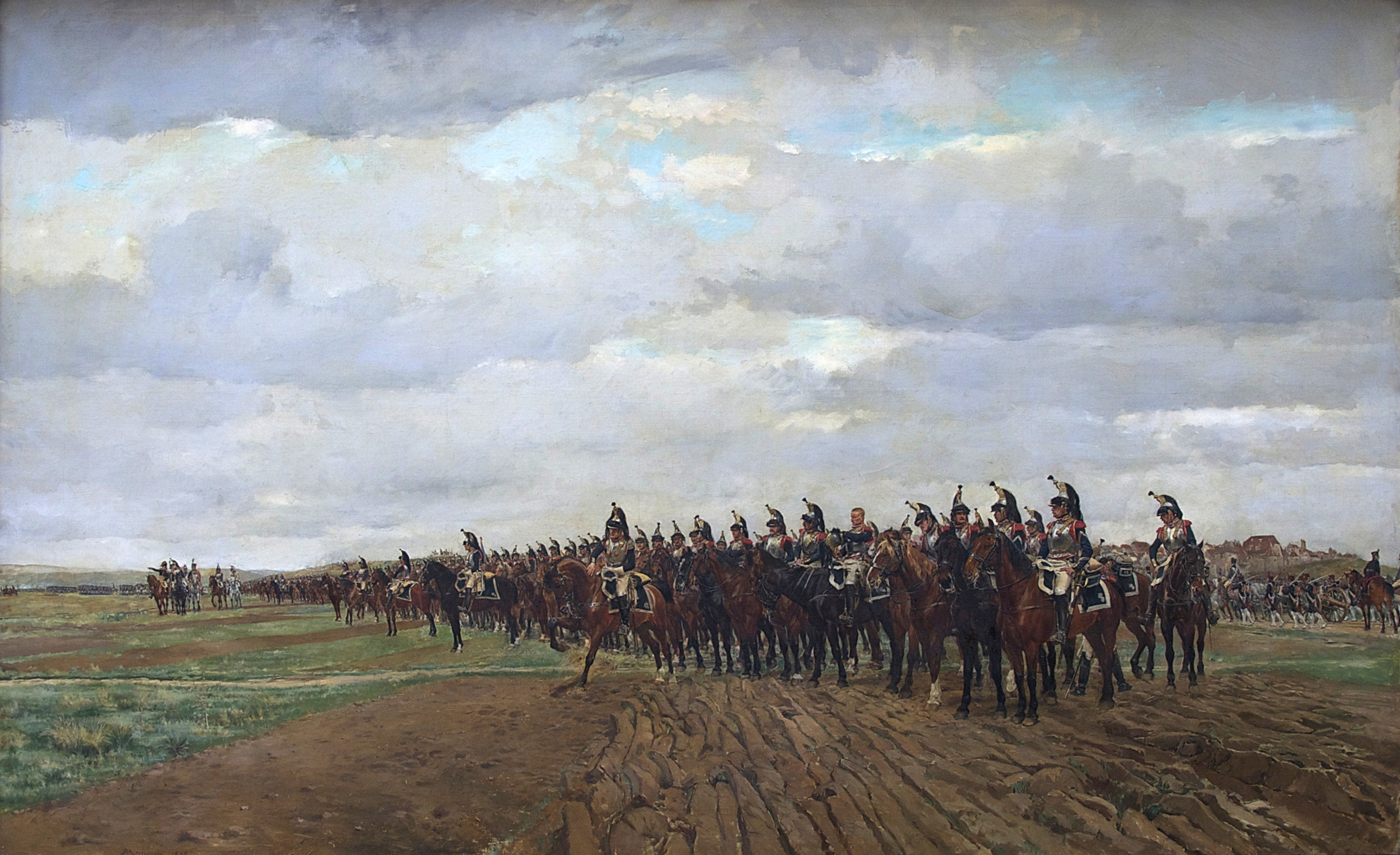
Cuirassiers in 1805, painting by Jean-Louis-Ernest Meissonier.

With the outbreak of the Napoleonic Wars, Napoleon I formed the Grande Armée and organised most of his cavalry in a large cavalry reserve corps under Marshal of the Empire Joachim Murat. Lhéritier continued to serve in the 11th Cuirassiers and in 1805 this regiment was included in General Raymond-Gaspard de Bonardi de Saint-Sulpice's 2nd Brigade of Jean-Joseph Ange d'Hautpoul's 2nd Heavy Cavalry Division. The 11th Cuirassiers itself was under the command of Colonel Albert Louis Emmanuel de Fouler. The regiment was heavily engaged at the Battle of Austerlitz, where it lost 14 dead and 37 wounded out of its pre-battle complement of 327 men. The regiment and its officers fought brilliantly and shortly after the battle, Colonel Fouler was promoted to brigadier general.

The next year saw the outbreak of the War of the Fourth Coalition, which opposed France to Prussia and Russia. On 5 October 1806, Lhéritier was promoted to colonel and given the command of the 10th Cuirassiers, a prestigious heavy cavalry regiment, formerly called Royal Cravates during the Ancien Régime, and which traced its origins back to the reign of Louis XIII. The regiment was a part of Marie Adrien François Guiton's 2nd Brigade of General d'Hautpoul's 2nd Heavy Cavalry Division. The division saw no major action during the 1806 campaign, but was heavily engaged at the Battle of Eylau on 8 February 1807. There, Colonel Lhéritier led his cuirassiers during Marshal Murat's famous cavalry charge. Lhéritier was wounded at his right hand when his horse was killed under him, but was soon back in the saddle and took off again at the head of his regiment in another charge. His senior commander, General d'Hautpoul, was fatally wounded during his heroic charge at Eylau. The 10th Cuirassiers took little part in the fighting that followed that battle.

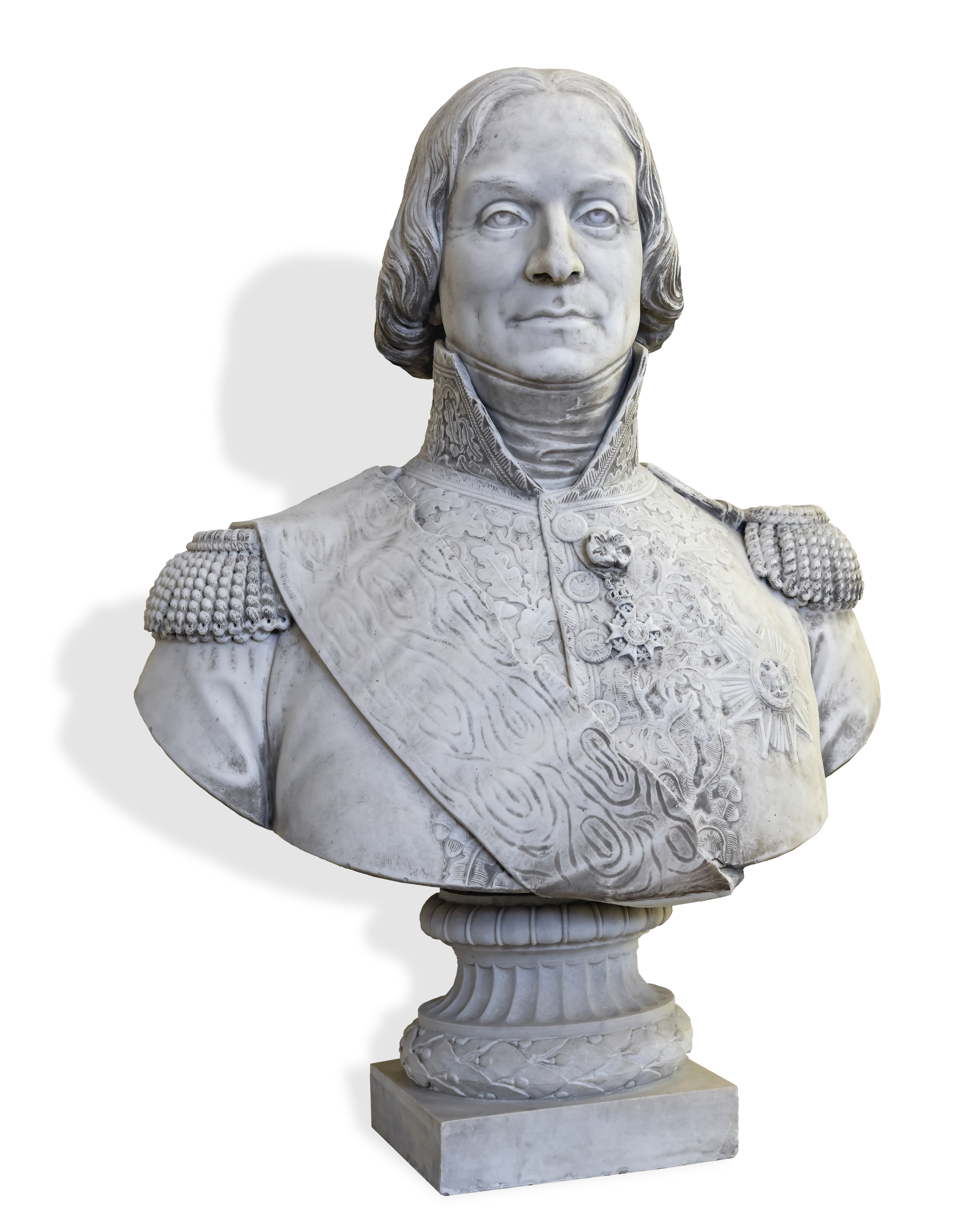
General d'Hautpoul, here portrayed as a General of the Revolution, was Lhéritier's divisional commander between 1805 and 1807.

The next significant engagement came in 1809, during the War of the Fifth Coalition, against Austria. The 10th Cuirassiers were again a part of General Guiton's 2nd Brigade of the 2nd Heavy Cavalry Division, now under the command of General Saint-Sulpice, who had taken divisional command following the death of d'Hautpoul in 1807. The regiment, numbering 4 squadrons and a complement of 610 men, saw action at the Battle of Aspern-Essling, where Colonel Lhéritier bravely led from the front and received a bullet wound to the right shoulder and had a horse shot under him. Six weeks later, at the Battle of Wagram, the 10th Cuirassiers saw brief combat and had only one officer wounded. The next engagement for the regiment came on 11 July at the Battle of Znaim. There, Colonel Lhéritier was again noted for his bravery, as he led his men into action and in the process received a severe wound at the head. His actions during the campaign of 1809 were regarded very highly and on 21 July 1809, he was promoted to brigadier general.

== General in the Grande Armée ==
Having been promoted to brigadier general on 21 July 1809, Lhéritier left his regiment the next day and was given command of the 2nd Brigade of the 3rd Heavy Cavalry Division. His command included the 7th and 8th Cuirassiers, but his brigade saw no action, as an armistice had been signed at Znaim on 12 July and the two parties were moving towards signing a peace treaty. The War of the Fifth Coalition ended on 14 October 1809 and General Lhéritier was discharged from his position on 1 May 1810. For almost a year, he was not given any assignment, but, on 26 March 1811, he was named inspector of the cavalry depots of the 1st, 15th, 21st and 22nd military divisions, then inspector of the remounts for the 2nd, 3rd, 4th and 5th military divisions (7 May 1811). He was subsequently given a field command, as he was placed at the helm of the 2nd brigade of General Jean-Pierre Doumerc's 3rd Heavy Cavalry Division (7 May 1811). During the upcoming French Invasion of Russia, General Lhéritier's brigade was noted for fighting with distinction at the Second Battle of Polotsk on 18–20 October 1812, but by then the outcome of the campaign had already been sealed and the remains of the once mighty Grande Armée pulled out of Russia.

The next year, on 15 March 1813, Lhéritier was promoted to the rank of general of division and on 1 July was given the command of the 4th Heavy Cavalry Division of III Cavalry Corps. A few weeks later, on 8 August, he was given another command, that of several cavalry brigades from Édouard Jean Baptiste Milhaud's V bis Cavalry Corps, before having to take over the provisional command of the entire corps, during Milhaud's absence. During the summer campaign in Saxony, Lhéritier was noted above all for his actions at the Battle of Gieshübel on 22 August. Towards the end of the year, on 5 October, he was given the command of the 5th Heavy Cavalry division, which was entirely composed of dragoons. The 1814 campaign took place on French soil and Napoleon reorganised his army for the defense of the country's frontiers. As a result, on 5 January, General Lhéritier was given the command of the 6th Heavy Cavalry division, then, at the end of January, the 4th Dragoon Division. He led his men into combat with distinction at virtually all the major battles of the campaign, including Brienne, La Rothière and Saint-Dizier.

== Bourbon Restoration and beyond ==
Following Napoleon's abdication, Lhéritier swore his allegiance to the Bourbon Restoration but from 1 June 1814 he was placed on half pay. Towards the end of the year, he was appointed Inspector General for cavalry in the 16th military division and took charge of this new function at the beginning of 1815. When Napoleon returned from exile and reclaimed power in France, Lhéritier rallied to his cause and was given a first field command on 23 April, namely the cavalry reserve of IV Army Corps. Then, on 3 June 1815, he was named commander of the 11th cavalry division, a mixed force composed of dragoons and cuirassiers. His direct subordinates were Brigadier General Cyrille Simon Picquet, in command of the 1st Brigade (2nd and 7th Dragoons) and none other than his former commander from 1806 to 1807 and 1809, Brigadier General Guiton, in command of the 2nd Brigade (8th and 11th Cuirassiers). The entire division was a part of François Etienne de Kellermann's III Cavalry Corps of the "Army of the North".

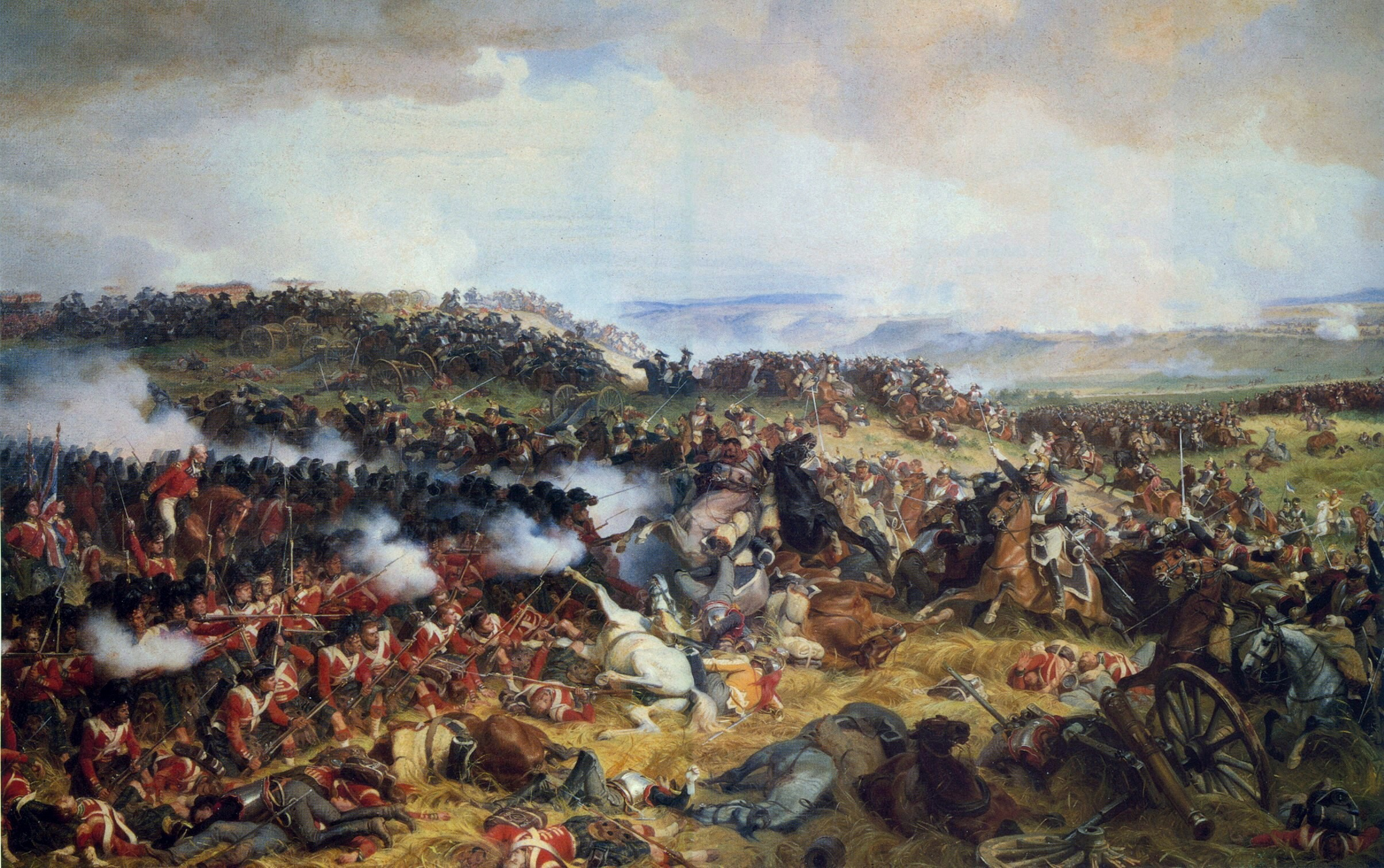
Lhéritier's cuirassiers were committed to battle at Waterloo and bravely charged the Allied infantry squares. Painting by Henri Félix Emmanuel Philippoteaux.

When the "Army of the North" attacked the forces of the Seventh Coalition in the United Kingdom of the Netherlands, Kellermann, with Lhéritier's division, was placed under the command of Marshal Michel Ney. On 16 June, Ney faced a massed Allied force at the Battle of Quatre Bras. Of Lhéritier's 11th cavalry division, only Guiton's cuirassier brigade was present and available for action. As Ney's situation became increasingly desperate, the Marshal ordered Kellermann to take his cuirassiers in a frontal charge against the enemy. The charge was very well handled and, despite the difficult terrain and the large numbers of the enemy, it did much to relieve the pressure on the French forces. At first, it broke Hugh Halkett's forces, then Frederick William, Duke of Brunswick-Wolfenbüttel's German infantry, eventually reaching the crucial Quatre Bras crossroads. However, this breakthrough could not be exploited, as no other units had been sent in immediate support of the heavy cavalry. The cuirassiers endured some close-range musketry before finally turning and retreating at a trot, a manoeuvre during which Kellermann had his horse shot under him and barely escaped capture. Two days later, the entire III Corps was reunited under Kellermann's command and was available for action at the Battle of Waterloo. Lhéritier's division was committed towards 17:30, during the afternoon attacks, as Ney sent in his cavalry in mass against the Allied centre. A series of charges ensued, but such a cavalry attack, without proper infantry or artillery support was always set to fail on an uneven battlefield such as the one at Waterloo and against an infantry that had plenty of time to form protective squares. Despite the efforts of the French cavalry – Lhéritier's division alone lost six officers dead, three mortally wounded and forty wounded – the battle was lost. During this action, Lhéritier received a bullet wound to the right shoulder.

Napoleon abdicated a second time following his defeat at Waterloo and, as the Bourbons returned to power in France, Lhéritier was placed on the non-active list on 20 September 1815. Although he was not called upon again for field service, the Bourbons did offer him the position of inspector general for cavalry and subsequently for gendarmerie. He died on 23 August 1829 in Conflans-Sainte-Honorine, near Paris.

== Recognition ==
Samuel-François Lhéritier was named Chevalier of the Legion of Honour on 15 June 1804, Officer of the same order on 14 May 1807 and commander of the order on 24 August 1814. He was also created a baron of the Empire in May 1808. The name LHERITIER is inscribed under the eastern pillar of the Arc de Triomphe in Paris.

== Sources ==
- Bukhari, Emir – "Napoleon's Cuirassiers and Carabiniers", Men-at-arms Series Osprey, 1977, ISBN 0-85045-096-9.
- Castle, Ian – "Aspern and Wagram 1809", Campaign Series 33, Osprey Military, 1994, ISBN 1-85532-366-4.
- Hourtoulle, François-Guy – "D'Eylau à Friedland", Histoire & Collections, 2007, ISBN 978-2-35250-020-9.
- Hourtoulle, François-Guy – "Wagram, l'apogée de l'Empire", Histoire & Collections, 2002, ISBN 2-913903-32-0
- Fierro, Alfredo; Palluel-Guillard, André; Tulard, Jean – "Histoire et Dictionnaire du Consulat et de l'Empire", Éditions Robert Laffont, ISBN 2-221-05858-5.
- Lapray, Olivier – "Dictionnaire des officiers de Cuirassiers du Premier Empire", Histoire & Collections, 2008, ISBN 978-2-35250-025-4.
- Pigeard, Alain – "Dictionnaire des batailles de Napoléon", Tallandier, Bibliothèque Napoléonienne, 2004, ISBN 2-84734-073-4
- Smith, Digby – "Great Cavalry Charges of the Napoleonic Wars", Greenhill Books London, 2003, ISBN 1-85367-541-5.
