= Battle of Saint-Dizier (January 1814) =

Coordinates: 48°38′21″N 04°57′09″E

The first Battle of Saint-Dizier was fought on 27 January 1814 near Saint-Dizier during the Campaign in north-east France (1814) of the War of the Sixth Coalition. It resulted in the victory of the French cavalry under Édouard Jean Baptiste Milhaud (commander in Napoleon's army) against Russian cavalry under the command of general Sergey Nikolaevich Lanskoy (Lanskoï).

The First Battle of Bar-sur-Aube on 24 January 1814 had been an indecisive clash between invading Austrian and Württembergish forces and defending French troops, which retreated afterwards. The Russo-Prussian Army of Silesia under the command of Blücher arrived at the river Aube on 27 January, passing Brienne and marching towards Lesmont. A Russian cavalry vanguard led by Lanskoy (part of Fabian Gottlieb von der Osten-Sacken's troops) was scouting the area to the north, moving past Saint Dizier towards Vitry-le-François. Meanwhile, in the morning of 27 January, Napoleon sent Milhaud's French cavalry from Vitry to Saint-Dizier, followed by the 2nd corps, itself supported by the 6th, the divisions of the young guard and the 1st cavalry corps.

At dawn, the French cavalry attack took Lanskoy by surprise, and he was driven back to Saint-Dizier. His infantry was soon driven out by general Guillaume Philibert Duhesme's infantry division, which did not spare the Russian cavalry, reinforced in the morning by Prince Biron's flying brigade. Hotly pursued all the way to Eurville by the French cavalry, Lanskoy, unable to fall back on Wassy, from where he could have taken the most direct route to Brienne via Montier-en-Der, was reduced to heading for Joinville, in order to reach the road to Brienne via Doulevant and Soulaines. He stopped in the evening at Doulevant, while the French cavalry, which had pushed forward along the Joinville and Eclaron roads, reached Wassy.

Napoleon and his troops had left Ligny the day before; Lanskoy held Saint-Dizier with 800 dragoons, and he left the town to join Blücher.

The second Battle of Saint-Dizier occurred on 26 March 1814, and resulted the victory of French under Napoleon Bonaparte against Russians under General Ferdinand Wintzingerode.
