= I Cavalry Corps (Grande Armée) =

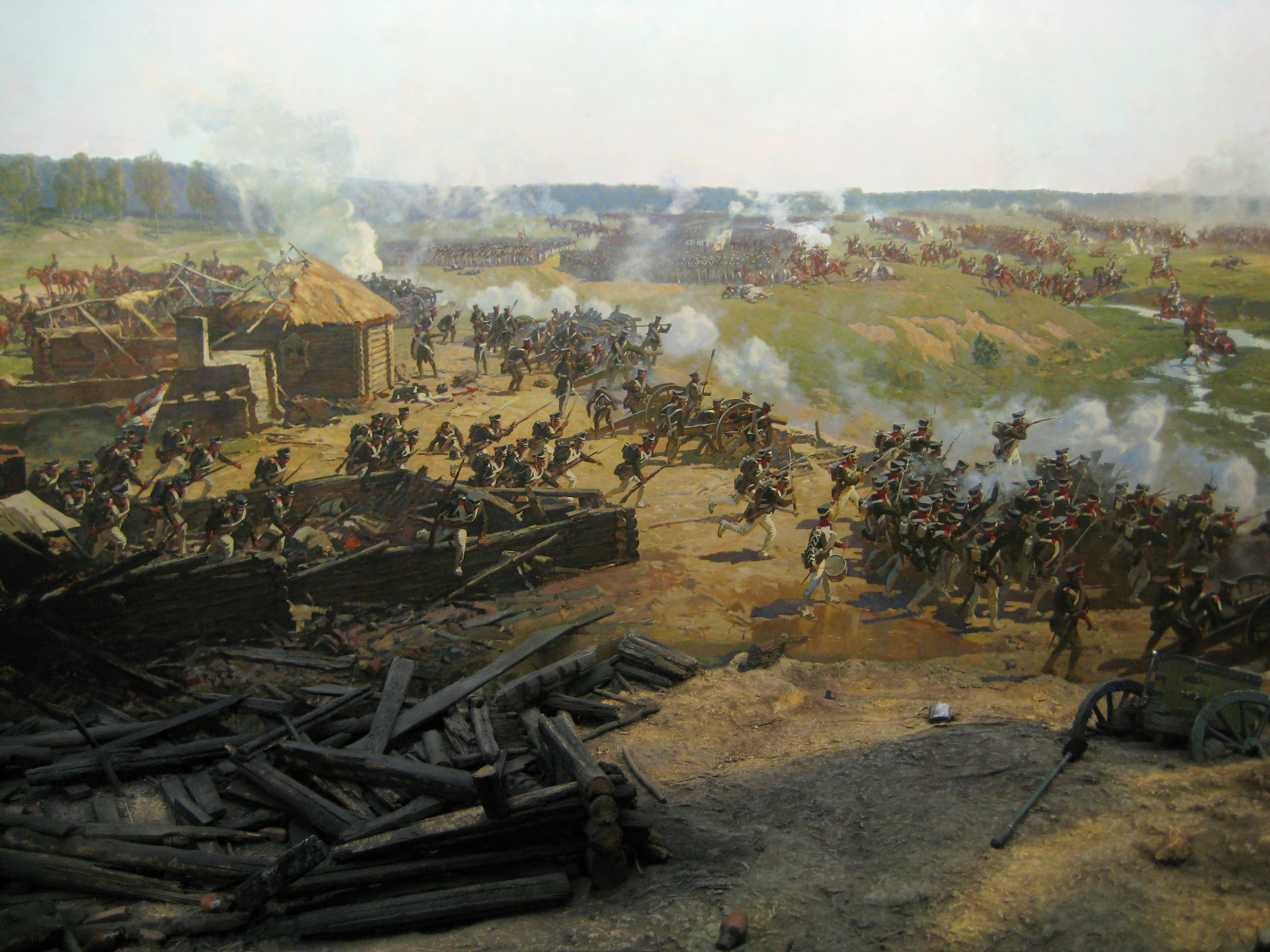
- Battle of Borodino panorama
- Active: 1812–1814
- Country: First French Empire
- Branch: French Imperial Army
- Type: Shock cavalry
- Size: Corps
- Engagements: Russian campaign War of the Sixth Coalition

Commanders
- Notable commanders: Jean-Pierre Doumerc; Joachim Murat; Étienne de Nansouty; Pierre Claude Pajol; Victor de Fay de La Tour-Maubourg

The I Cavalry Corps of the Grande Armée was a French military unit that existed during the Napoleonic Wars.

== History ==
For one month in 1806–1807, Emperor Napoleon Bonaparte split his Reserve Cavalry Corps into the I and II Cavalry Corps. At that time, Marshal Joachim Murat took command of the short-lived I Cavalry Corps before resuming leadership over Napoleon's Reserve Cavalry when the experiment ended.

The I Cavalry Corps was not recreated until 1812 for the invasion of Russia when command was exercised by General Étienne Marie Antoine Champion de Nansouty. The corps fought at Borodino and Tarutino. After being destroyed during the retreat from Russia, the I Cavalry Corps was reconstituted in 1813 and General Victor de Fay de La Tour-Maubourg was appointed to lead it. The corps fought at Lützen, Bautzen, Dresden, and Leipzig. At Leipzig, the corp took part in Murat's great charge, Latour-Maubourg was seriously wounded at the battle and replaced by General Jean-Pierre Doumerc who led the corps for the remainder of the War of the Sixth Coalition which ended with Napoleon's abdication in 1814.
