= Édouard Jean Baptiste Milhaud =

French politician and general (1766–1833)

Edouard Jean-Baptiste Milhaud
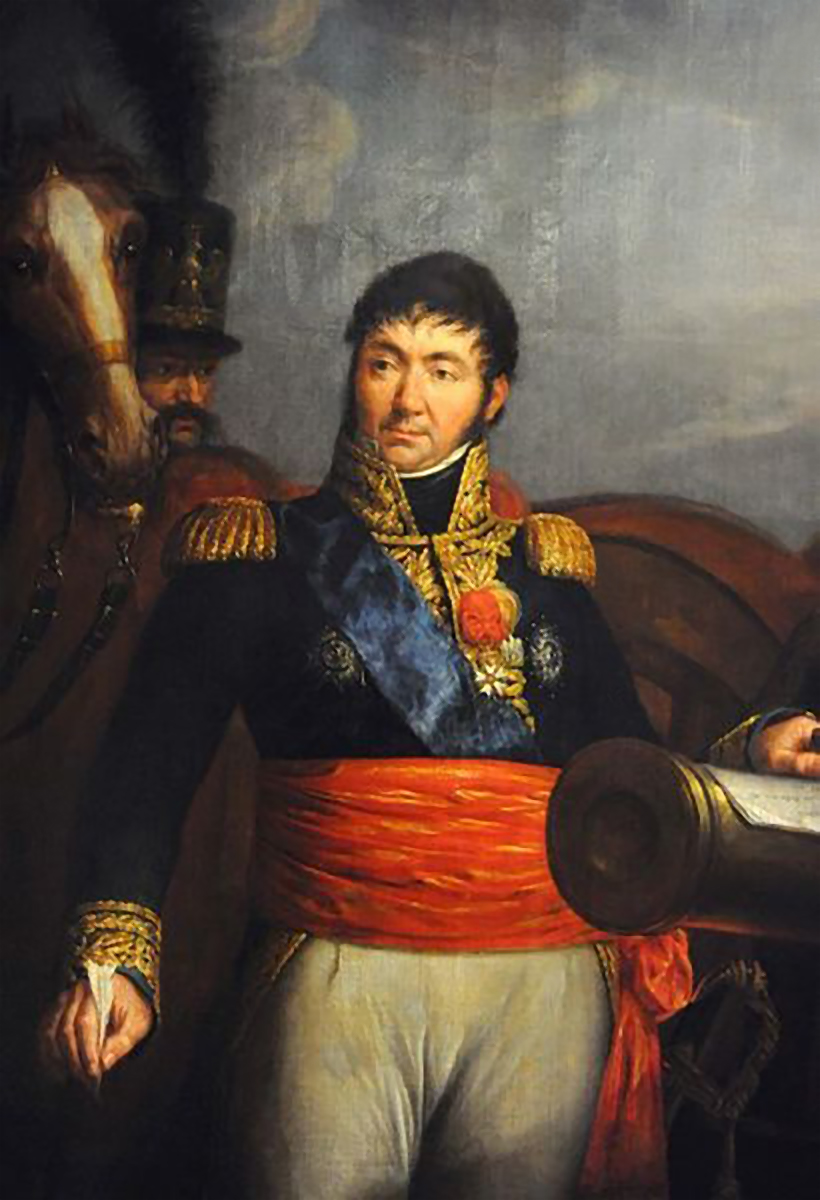
- Portrait by Charles Verhulst, 1808
- Born: 10 July 1766; Arpajon-sur-Cère, France
- Died: 10 December 1833 (aged 67); Aurillac, France
- Military career
- Allegiance: France
- Branch: Cavalry
- Service years: 1780s - 1815
- Rank: General of division
- Conflicts: French Revolutionary Wars; Napoleonic Wars
- Awards: Count of the Empire; Name inscribed on the Arc de Triomphe

Édouard Jean-Baptiste Milhaud (French pronunciation: [edwaʁ ʒɑ̃ batist milo]; 10 July 1766 – 10 December 1833) was a French politician and general. He distinguished himself throughout the French Revolutionary and Napoleonic Wars and is considered one of the best generals of cavalry of Napoleon's army.

== Early life and career ==
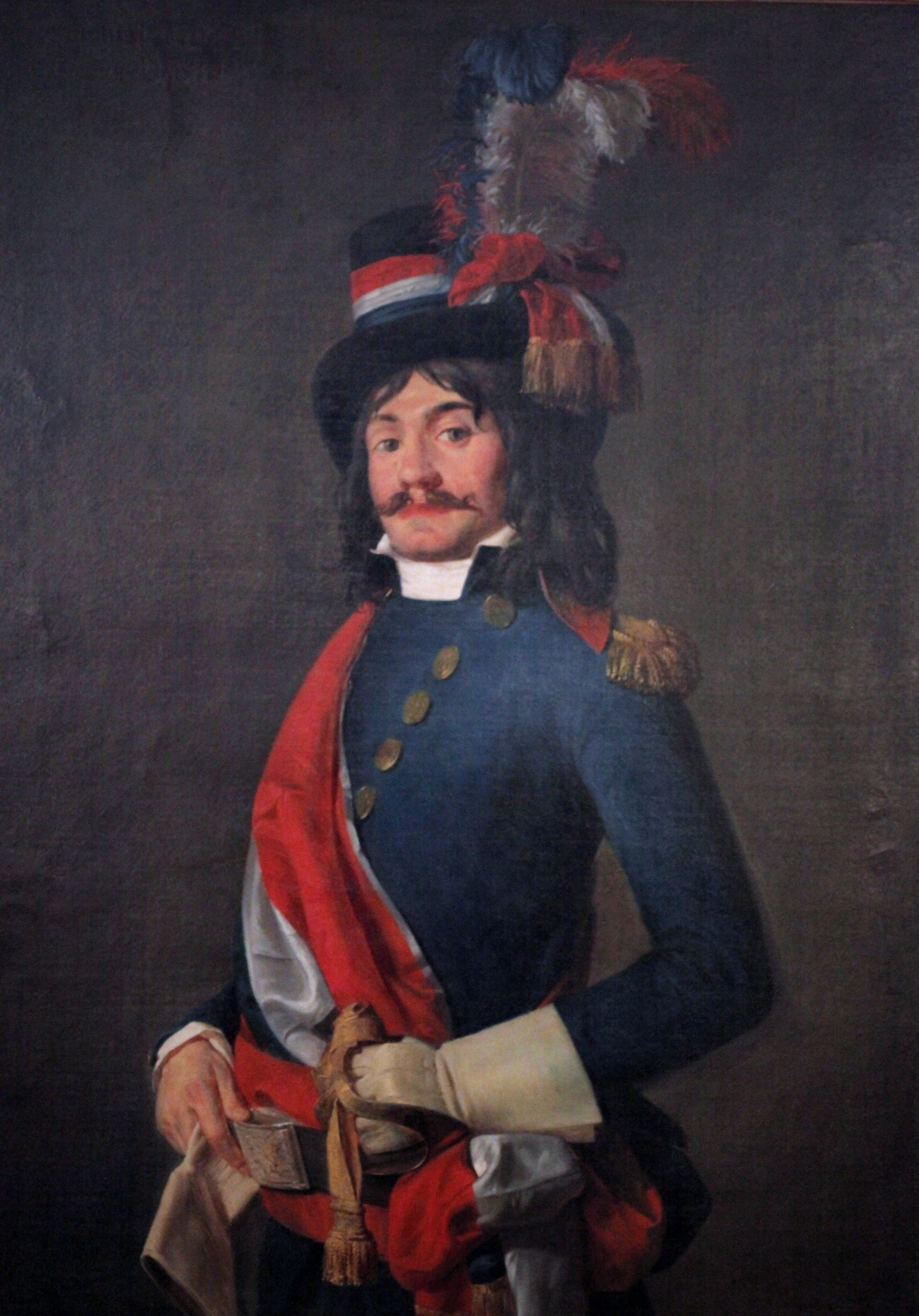
Édouard Jean Baptiste Milhaud, deputy of the Convention, in his uniform of representative of the People to the Armies, by Jean-François Garneray or another follower of Jacques-Louis David.

Born in Arpajon-sur-Cère as the farmers son of Louis Amilhaud and Marguerite Daudé, Milhaud displayed great talent from a young age, excelling in naval engineering studies and gaining a reputation for political activism. He was commissioned as an officer in 1789. During the French Revolution, Milhaud took part in the Storming of the Bastille, managed to get himself appointed as commander of the Aurillac National Guard in 1791 and was then elected to the National Convention (which aimed at giving France a new political constitution) and in the proces of Louis XVI he voted for the death of the king and was a regular at the Jacobin club. He defended Jean-Paul Marat against the attacks of the Girondins. In 1793 he was sent as a commissary to the armies of the Rhine and the Ardennes where he distinguished himself in his severity and his zeal in applying revolutionary ideological principles. Sent to the Army of the Pyrenees, he was successful in aiding Dugommier in restoring order. He was recalled the next year and made a member of the Convention's military committee.

== French Revolutionary Wars ==
After the fall of Robespierre, Milhaud was threatened with arrest but saved from this fate by his colleagues on the military committee. His political role effectively over, he was recalled to the army and he became commandant of the 5th dragoons and was sent to the Army of Italy. Milhaud saw action at the Battle of Mondovì and Battle of Castiglione. He distinguished himself first at the capture of Primolano, then at Brenta, where he swam across the river to cut off the retreat of an Austrian force numbering 8,000 men, which he captured with eight cannons, fifteen caissons and six flags. The next day in the battle of Bassano, he charged the enemy rearguard with 200 dragoons, cutting through a Hungarian battalion and capturing twelve cannons which he successfully ordered his men to turn against an enemy division advancing to retake them. Later that year he was wounded in the head at San Michele while fighting in the gorges of the Tyrol. The following year he was again accused because of his role during the Terror but the Council of Elders decided not to act on the accusation.

Milhaud took an active part in the conspiracy leading up to 18 brumaire which was the day of the coup d'état by which General Napoleon Bonaparte overthrew the French Directory. Promoted to general de brigade in January 1800 he was employed in the Army of England and was made commander of the 8th military division in the Vaucluse and then given military command of all forces in the Ligurian Republic on July 7, 1803. A strict disciplinarian, Milhaud drilled units constantly and insisted on the highest possible conduct from the men under his command, severely punishing those who had been found guilty of rape, theft, arson and other serious crimes.

== Napoleonic Wars ==
During the War of the Third Coalition Milhaud served under Joachim Murat in the 1805 campaign at the head of a light cavalry brigade consisting of the 16th and 22nd Chasseurs a Cheval. In November, he captured the town of Linz after a sharp engagement, routed an enemy force at Asten the next day, followed up by seizing Enns and then formed the vanguard of Marshal Davout's advance, driving the enemy along the Braun road as far as Wolkersdorf, taking over 600 prisoners and a large artillery piece. At the Battle of Austerlitz, Milhaud's brigade was in heavy fighting on the French left and harried the Austrian artillery positions. On the outbreak of the War of the Fourth Coalition in 1806, Milhaud was given command of a light cavalry brigade in Jean-de-Dieu Soult's corps, first taking part in the Battle of Schleiz and distinguishing himself at the Battle of Jena and again at Prenzlau during the pursuit of the beaten Prussian army. On 28 October 1806, he forced 6,000 Prussian troops of the corps of Prince Hohenlohe to capitulate at Pasewalk. When Napoleon crossed the Wkra River in December at Czarnowo, Milhaud's brigade initially acted as a screen for Augereau's corps and then aggressively pursued the Russians around Kołoząb, capturing a baggage train in the process. At the end of 1806 he was promoted to general of division and in 1807 he fought against the Russians at the Battle of Golymin and then distinguished himself at Allenstein, Hoff, Eylau and during the capture of Konigsberg. After the conclusion of the campaign, Milhaud and his division were sent to Hanover for a time.

His superb performance brought him to the attention of Napoleon Bonaparte who personally congratulated him, and having already been awarded the Légion d'honneur, on 10 March he was made a Count of the Empire. From 1808 until 1811, he fought in the Peninsular War, where his tactical skill, insistence on discipline and effective counter-insurgency methods, resulted in one of the most consistently successful records of any French commander in that conflict.

Upon his arrival in Spain, Milhaud was placed in command of several regiments of Dragoons and first saw significant action at the Battle of Gamonal and then at Ciudad Real where he seized a vital bridge crossing. Milhaud continued to see action at Talavera, and at the Battle of Almonacid, when his cavalry outflanked the Spanish left. In November, 1809, in the lead up to the Battle of Ocaña, the cavalry of Milhaud and Paris, made up of eight regiments, numbering almost 3,000 men, riding at the head of the French army, crossed the Tagus river at Aranjuez and engaged four divisions of horsemen under Manuel Freire de Andrade, over 4,000 sabres, moving at the head of Areizaga's column. The French cavalry swept the Spanish from the field, inflicting hundreds of casualties and then proceeded to take part in the main battle on November 19, which resulted in a crushing Spanish defeat. According to Oman (1908), "the collision of Milhaud and Freire brought about the largest cavalry fight which took place during the whole Peninsular War".

During the French occupation of Andalusia and Granada beginning in early 1810, Milhaud led his division to victory at Alcalá la Real, Antequera, and at Almanzora, before proceeding to inflict a stinging defeat on Joaquín Blake at Baza. Another one of Milhaud's achievements around this time was crushing a formidable gang of guerrillas led by Juan Martín Díez. In July 1811, as part of Marshal Soult's Army of the South, Milhaud served at the head of 1,595 Dragoons in General Sebastiani's IV Corps. Napoleon was impressed by Milhaud's performance in the Peninsular War and made him a Grand Officer of the Legion of Honor.

Milhaud returned to France in July, 1811, with the permission of his commander Jean-de-Dieu Soult. In November 1811 he was put on disability but in June 1812 he was recalled to active service and made commandant of the 25th military division. During the invasion of Russia, he was attached to the imperial headquarters and became for a short time the military commandant of Moscow.

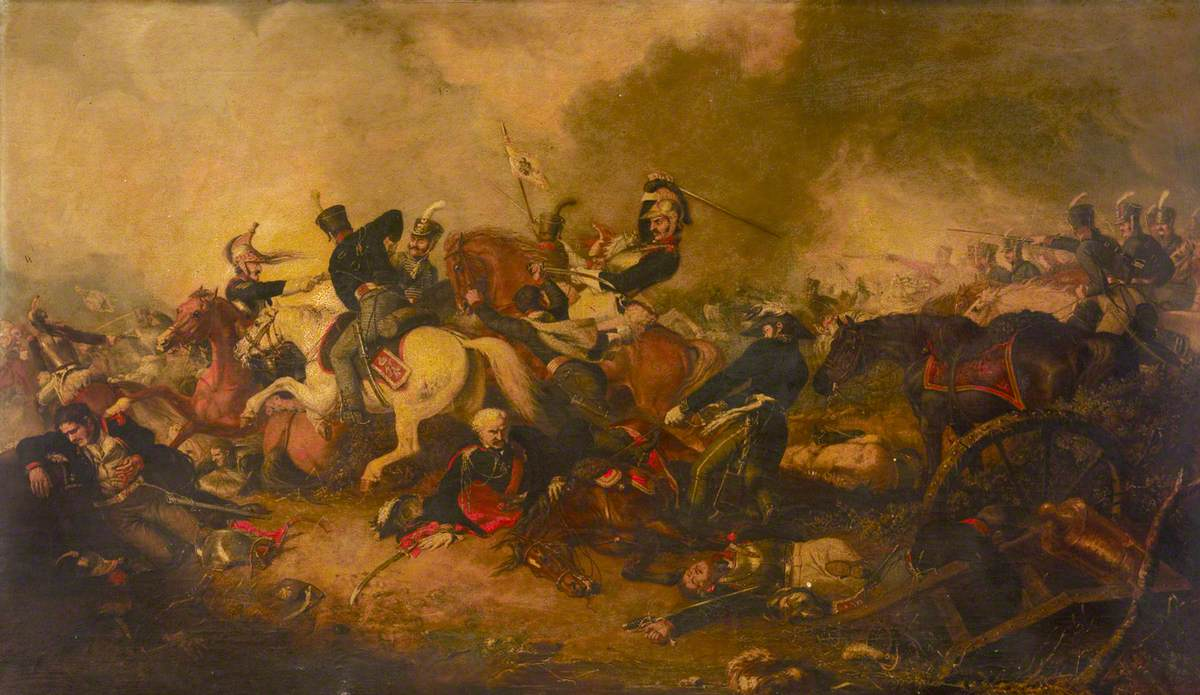
Cuirassiers of Milhaud's IV Cavalry Corps break the Prussian center at Ligny.

In the autumn campaign of 1813, Milhaud took charge of a heavy cavalry division, where he fought, on October 10, 1813, in the plain of Zeitz, one of the best fights of cavalry mentioned in French military annals, and in which he completely destroyed regiments of Austrian Latour and Hohenzollern Dragoons, as well as the Kaiser Chevau-légers. Three days later he was in the thick of the action at Liebertwolkwitz and then fought hard in the southern sector at the Battle of Leipzig, succeeding Pierre Claude Pajol as commander of V Cavalry Corps after Pajol was wounded by an exploding shell on the first day. During Napoleon's retreat to the borders of France, Milhaud successfully prevented an allied attempt to cut off the French escape at Eckartsberga, took part in the Battle of Hanau and defeated a combined Austro-Bavarian force that had crossed the Rhine in a series of actions at Croix-en-Plaine between the 24th and 31 December. Based on his experience with these commands, in 1814 Milhaud became Inspector General of the cavalry. He served throughout the Campaign in north-east France in command of V Cavalry Corps, earning the admiration of superiors for his conduct throughout the fighting. First, he severely mauled a Russian cavalry unit commanded by Sergey Nikolaevich Lanskoy in a surprise attack at the Battle of Saint-Dizier and then distinguished himself at Brienne by spearheading initial attacks and moving to cover the French right flank. V Cavalry Corps next fought at the Battle of La Rothière where Milhaud was successfully thrown in to cover the disengagement of Napoleon's outnumbered army. When the emperor turned south to confront Schwarzenberg,Milhaud gained further distinction by leading attacks at Mormant, Nangis and Valjouan, then pressed on to drive Württemberg cavalry from the village of Villars. When Napoleon's marshals were badly beaten at Laubressel and Fère-Champenoise, Milhaud's corps maintained its cohesion far better than most other French forces and performed rearguard actions to cover the retreats of other units. After the Restoration he was awarded the Order of Saint Louis and given command of the 15th military division by Louis XVIII.

Milhaud remained a staunch supporter of Napoleon and during the Hundred Days, he was one of the first to rally to the emperor, and in the Waterloo campaign he commanded the IV Cavalry Corps. At the Battle of Ligny on 16 June 1815 with his cuirassier divisions he broke the center of the Prussian army and helped to win Napoleon's last victory. Two days later at the Battle of Waterloo 18 June his divisions took part in the great general cavalry assault on the allied center, a plan he had opposed but had to execute. The attacks ultimately proved a failure.

After the second restoration Milhaud was banished by King Louis XVIII as a regicide, but he was allowed to remain in France after making an appeal to the king although he chose to go into retirement. After the July Revolution in 1830, he rallied to Louis Philippe and was placed on the reserve list on February 7, 1831, and granted a retirement pension. He died on 10 December 1833 in Aurillac.

== Personal life ==
Milhaud was married for the first time in 1794 to Marianne Lignieres (1775-1821), a pretty girl from Perpignan whose father was a wealthy grocer and together they had two children. Edouard-André-Scipion Milhaud, and Therese-Rose-Françoise Milhaud. After the death of his first wife in June 1821, Milhaud remarried to Louise Admirat (1759-1829), a widower and one of the rare women employed in Chronometry during the first quarter of the 19th century.

== Bibliography ==
- Niemann, August (Hrsg.): Militär-Handlexikon. Adolf Bonz & Comp., Stuttgart, 1881.
