= Pierre Claude Pajol =

French cavalry general and political figure (1772–1844)

Claude Pierre Pajol
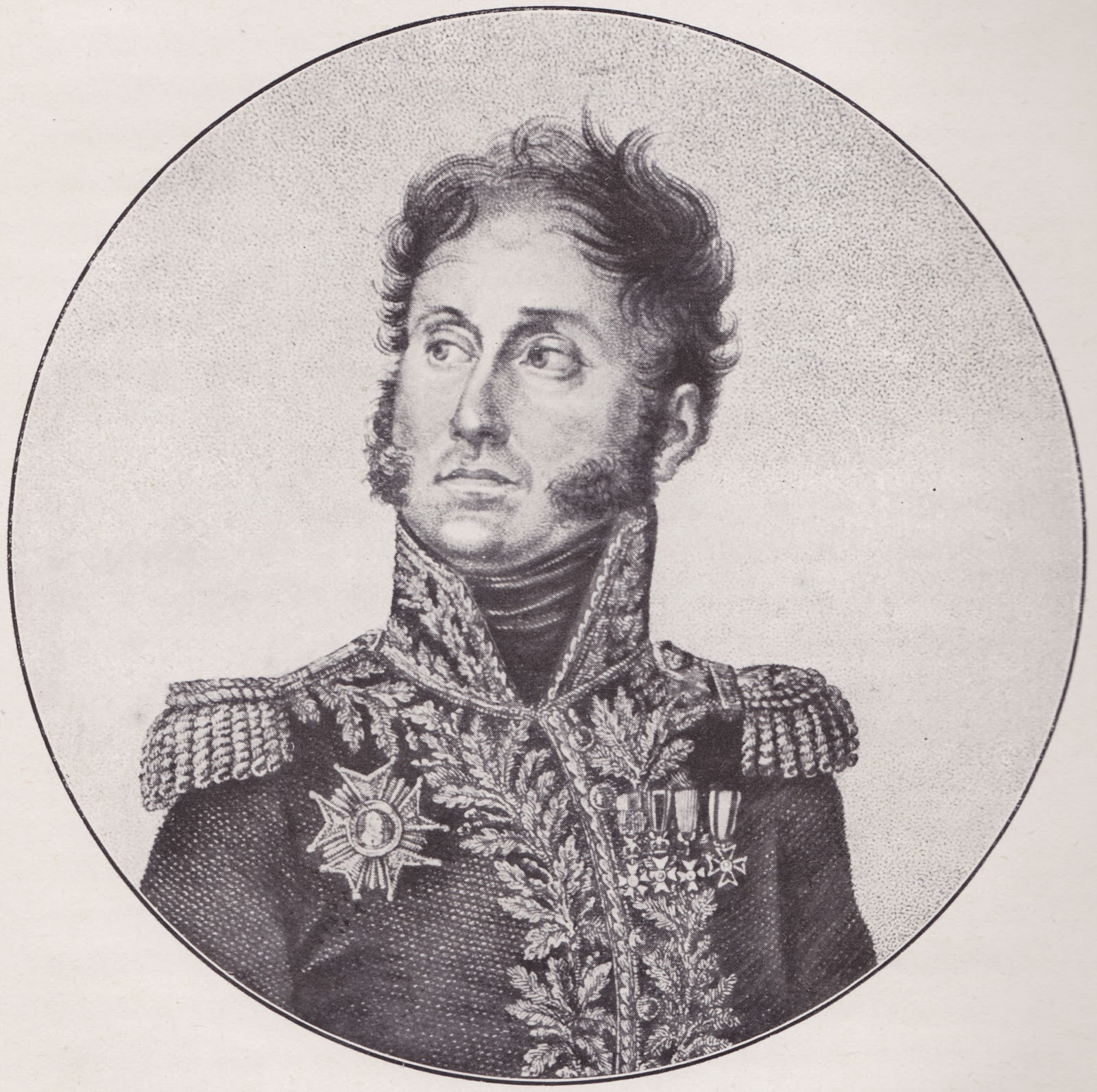
- Claude Pierre Pajol
- Born: 3 February 1772; Aups, France
- Died: 20 March 1844 (aged 72) Paris, France
- Allegiance: French First Republic; First French Empire; Kingdom of France
- Branch: French Revolutionary Army; French Imperial Army
- Service years: 1789–1815, 1830–1842
- Rank: Général de division
- Commands: I Cavalry Corps; Military governor of Paris
- Conflicts: French Revolutionary Wars; Napoleonic Wars; July Revolution

Claude-Pierre, Comte de Pajol (French pronunciation: [klod pjɛʁ paʒɔl]; 3 February 1772 – 20 March 1844), was a French cavalry general and political figure during and after the French Revolutionary and Napoleonic Wars.

== Early life ==
He was born in Besançon, as the son of a lawyer. He was intended to follow his father's profession, but the events of 1789 led him to join the battalion of Besançon, where he took part in the political events of that year.

== Revolution ==
In 1791 he joined the French Revolutionary Army of the Upper Rhine with a volunteer battalion.

He took part in the campaign of 1792 and was one of the stormers at Hochheim (1793). From the Count of Custine's staff he was transferred to that of Jean-Baptiste Kléber, with whom he took part in the Sambre and Rhine campaigns (1794–96). After serving with Louis Lazare Hoche and André Masséna in Germany and Switzerland (1797–99), Pajol took a cavalry command under Jean Victor Marie Moreau for the campaign on the upper Rhine.

== First Empire ==
In the short years of peace Pajol, now colonel, successively served as envoy to the Batavian Republic, and delegate at Napoleon's coronation (the start of the First French Empire). In 1805, the emperor employed him with the light cavalry. He distinguished himself at the battle of Austerlitz, and, after serving for a short time in the Italian Peninsula, he rejoined the Grande Armée as a general of brigade, in time to take part in the campaign of Friedland. The next year (1808) he was made a Baron d'Empire.

In 1809 he served on the Danube, and in the Russian War of 1812 led a division, and afterwards a corps, of cavalry. He survived retreat, but his health was so broken that he retired to his native town of Besançon for a time. He was back again in active service, however, in time to be present at the battle of Dresden, in which he played a conspicuous part. Again wounded in the battle of Leipzig, Pajol was created a count of the Empire on 25 November 1813.

In 1814 he fought in the Six Days' Campaign, commanding a corps of all arms in the Seine Valley. On the fall of Napoleon, Pajol gave his allegiance to the Restoration government, but he rejoined the Emperor immediately upon his return to France. The I Cavalry Corps (1^{er} corps de cavalerie) under his leadership played a prominent part in the campaign of 1815, both at Ligny and in the advance on Wavre under the Marquis de Grouchy. On receiving the news of the battle of Waterloo, Pajol disengaged his command, and skillfully retreated to refuge in Paris. There he and his men played an active part in the actions that ended the war.

== Later life ==
The Bourbons, on their return, dismissed him, although this treatment was not, compared to that applied to Michel Ney and others, excessively harsh. In 1830 he took part in the July Revolution and the overthrow of Charles X. He suppressed the riots in Paris in 1831 and 1832, 1834 and 1839. A general, and a peer of France, he was put on the retired list in 1842 and died two years later.

== Family ==
His son, Count Charles Paul Victor Pajol (1821–1891), entered the army and reached the rank of général de division when, during the Franco-Prussian War, he was involved in the catastrophe of Metz (1870). He retired in 1877. Judged a competent soldier, he was also a sculptor of some merit, who executed statues of his father and of Napoleon. He wrote a life of his father and a history of the wars under Louis XV (Paris 1881–1891).
