= Battle of Saint-Dizier =

March 1814 battle during the War of the Sixth Coalition

- Part of the Campaign of France of the Sixth Coalition
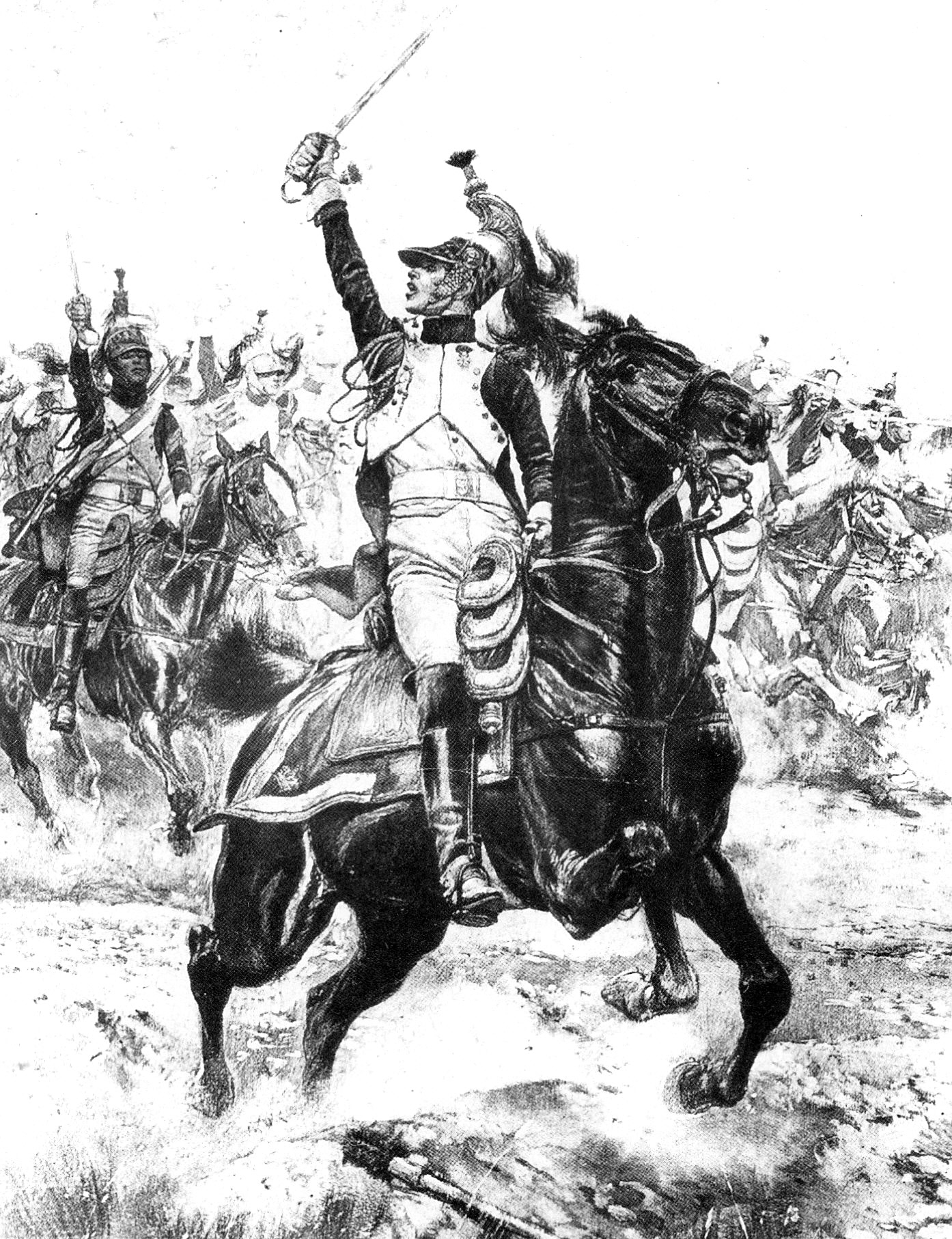
- Charge of the dragoons of the Imperial Guard at the Battle of Saint-Dizier
Date	26 March 1814
Location	Saint-Dizier, France 48°38′18″N 4°56′59″E
Result	French victory

Belligerents
France	Russia

Commanders and leaders
(First French Empire) Napoleon Bonaparte (First French Empire) Jacques MacDonald	(Russian Empire) Ferdinand Wintzingerode

Strength
10,000–34,000	8,000–10,000, mostly cavalry

Casualties and losses
600	1,500–2,500; 18 guns
- Location within France

War of the Sixth Coalition:
Campaign in north-east France
current battle
Napoleon in command
Napoleon not in command

The Battle of Saint-Dizier was fought on 26 March 1814, between the Russian Army under Ferdinand Wintzingerode and The French Army, also known as La Grande Armée, commanded by Napoleon Bonaparte. The battle was part of Napoleon's Campaign of France, which took place during the War of the Sixth Coalition. It was Napoleon's last military victory before the surrender of Paris and his subsequent abdication.

== Background ==
Blücher and Schwarzenberg agreed to attack Napoleon from both sides with all their united forces and thus, if possible, to put an end to the war with one blow. Blücher, therefore, marched from Rheims to Châlons, Schwarzenberg from Arcis-sur-Aube to Vitry, in search of Napoleon: instead of falling back before him at some distance from one another, and thus giving Napoleon plenty of room, as he had expected, they boldly formed a junction of their several divisions behind him. Blücher and Schwarzenberg hoped that Napoleon might turn back when he found his expectations foiled, and that they would then fight him in the great plains between the Marne and the Aube, where the Allies could make use of their numerical superiority in cavalry against the French cavalry, but Napoleon was already on his way to Saint-Dizier, and had only left a small division behind him, which occupied the villages along the road, close to Vitry.

On 24 March Schwarzenberg reached Vitry, where he met with King Frederick William III of Prussia and Tsar Alexander I of Russia. It was decided to march with the united force towards Paris and to leave the pursuit of Napoleon to the cavalry and horse artillery of General Wintzingerode, who was to harass Napoleon's troops. Napoleon had nothing but chosen troops with him and could form a junction with the numerous garrisons in his fortified towns.

Maison, in the Netherlands, had already joined his forces to those of Carnot, who was then threatening Brussels, and might at any moment render assistance to Napoleon. Behind the Allies the whole country was in a state of insurrection, which would naturally be increased by the approach of Napoleon. Marshal Augereau was at the head of numerous forces at Lyon, and could send troops, in order to support Napoleon, and perhaps alleviate some pressure.

Meanwhile, the Allied armies, plunged deeper and deeper into the heart of France, were separated from the sources from whence they drew their supplies; the Allies were in the midst of a desolate country, without any point upon which they could fall back for their supplies or support and were shortly about to appear before the capital of the kingdom, the population of which were perfectly capable of giving employment to, and even destroying, a whole army. All this was sufficient to excite the greatest anxiety; but in their determination the allies clearly took the right course, even had the results been less successful. Paris and Napoleon had now lost the importance which they mutually gave to one another.

The large Allied armies broke up their quarters near the Aube and the Marne on 24 and 25 March, on their way to Paris. On the 25th, near Fere-Champenoise, they encountered the united troops of Marshals Marmont and Mortier, who were on their way from Soissons to join Napoleon. After a short but bloody engagement the two marshals were beaten, their troops utterly destroyed, and the march on Paris was resumed.

On the evening of 24 March Wintzingerode advanced with all his cavalry from Vitry towards Saint-Dizier, where Napoleon had directed his march, true to his intention of drawing the allies away from Paris, and approaching his own fortresses.

The command of the advance guard was entrusted to Tettenborn, who had five regiments of Cossacks, one of Hussars, and eight pieces of horse artillery under him. The French had withdrawn from the neighbourhood of Vitry during that afternoon, and the Allies only came up with them at nightfall in the village of Thieblemont, where they had some sharp skirmishing with the French infantry.

On the following day the pursuit was continued with increased vigor, and the Allies overtook a still larger French division at Saint-Dizier, where a brisk engagement took place. The French held possession of Saint-Dizier with infantry, so as to cover the march of the other troops who were there recrossing and marching along the Marne. From the direction which these troops were taking, it appeared certain that Napoleon intended again to attack the main Allied armies; he must, therefore, have received some intelligence of the direction they were taking towards Paris.

On the other side of the river the Allies saw compact masses of troops coming straight towards them, having changed their line of march; they advanced down to the banks, and then marched away, up the heights on the left. Tettenborn immediately brought his guns close to the bank of the river, and commenced the pouring of a murderous fire of cannonballs and grenades upon the nearest French troops, which retreated into the woods with the loss of many men. As a regiment of Cossacks now crossed the Marne, and threatened to cut off the troops in Saint-Dizier, these men, who up until this point had not withdrawn, likewise fled to the woods. However, the French were not long exposed to this fire, as a portion of their artillery, placed on the heights of Valcourt, commanding the road which lay through a narrow gorge, soon silenced the Allied guns.

The French held the heights of Valcourt until evening, and then pursued their retreat towards Wassy. Tettenborn followed close at their heels, and drove them out of the village of Humbecourt, but found it impossible to penetrate further, as the adjoining villages were full of infantry, who offered the most obstinate resistance; a sure sign that the main body of the French army was close by, with the result that the Allied troops could not approach any nearer.

The skirmishing continued all the night, during which the Allies saw the whole surface of the country between them and Wassy lighted up with numerous watch-fires, which stretched a long way to the Allies' right along the wood, almost reaching their headquarters. Tettenborn passed the night in Eclaron, while General Wintzingerode fixed his headquarters in Saint-Dizier, and sent a considerable number of troops from Vitry towards Montier-en-Der, to secure the Allied right flank.

== Battle ==
Early on the morning of 26 March, The French, numbering roughly 30,000 men, advanced against the Allies on all sides, forcing the Cossacks to retreat: considerable bodies of cavalry showed themselves on both sides of the Allied force. On first seeing these masses of troops, Tettenborn assured Wintzingerode that the whole French army had turned and was marching against the Allies.

The danger was imminent, the nature of the ground prevented the Allies using even one regiment of Cossacks with any advantage, and all the French had to do to entirely cut off the Allied force would be to capture the village of Valcourt in the Allied rear before the Allies did. Nothing, therefore, remained but to retreat immediately across the Marne, which Tettenborn did, remaining as long as he could on the left bank of the river, to give Wintzingerode time to take such measures as he might think necessary. Whilst Wintzingerode was still doubtful whether Napoleon was actually approaching with his whole force, and hesitated to give full credit to Tettenborn's statements, he saw General Tschernyscheff suddenly driven back from Montier-en-Der, while he himself was attacked at the same moment.

The French poured their forces upon the enemy with incredible rapidity; troop followed troop, the whole plain was covered, and in a few minutes the engagement enlarged to all sides. Numerous guns were brought on the plain and pointed against Saint-Dizier. The country was flat, but cut up with vineyards and hedges, and too much hemmed in on all sides by woods and low bottoms for the Allies' numerous cavalry to be used with any advantage.

It was still possible by a rapid retreat to avoid an action which the Allies would be sure to lose. Tettenborn tried to impress this upon others; but, unfortunately, 700 Russian chasseurs were stationed in Saint-Dizier; and as these were the only infantry which Wintzingerode had with him, he delayed his retreat in the hope of saving them. He therefore ordered Tettenborn to defend the road to Vitry, while Wintzingerode maintained himself in Saint-Dizier, intending to fall back upon Bar-le-Duc in case of necessity.

Meanwhile, the French had crossed the Marne between Valcourt and Saint-Dizier, with large bodies of cavalry, infantry, and some artillery, and advanced without being impeded towards the road to Vitry; the guns planted on the heights of Valcourt had covered this advancement. The Russian cavalry and horse artillery were distributed in the plain behind this road; in their rear was the wood, whilst in their front laid the French, who poured heavy fire into the Allied ranks.

The baggage and horses had not yet been sent to the rear, and caused a considerable amount of disorder. On one side of this road to the right, Tettenborn stood his ground with about 1,000 horses, of which four squadrons were hussars, the rest Cossacks. A body of at least 10,000 French cavalry had already crossed the Marne, and had forced their way between Tettenborn and Wintzingerode. Tettenborn was in momentary expectation of seeing these masses suddenly deploy and throw his men into utter confusion.

Meanwhile, bodies of infantry and artillery continued to cross the river, and to form. It was no use for the Allies to think now of retreating, as the cavalry was close upon them; a resolute front could scarcely check them, much less a retreating foe. Tettenborn, therefore, formed his 1,000 men into a compact body, with which he charged the masses of French, just as they were about to deploy. The hussars and Cossacks attacked the French and drove them back: the first line was broken, then the second; and the contest was most bloody. But fresh masses of French cavalry deployed on both sides of him; more and more troops came from the background – Tettenborn withdrew after French reinforcements arrived.

The Allied troops came within the range of the enemy's guns, broke and were put to the rout along the road to Vitry; here the baggage and horses, flying in all directions, caused indescribable confusion. Tettenborn, who with his officers had maintained the contest to the last, and had been in great personal danger, got his troops again into some order at the village of Perthe, skirmished a little with the French that same evening, and retreated during the night by Marolles to Vitry. His whole loss consisted of only forty men. The rest of Wintzingerode's cavalry, who were drawn up on the plains by Saint-Dizier, and who had waited till the French attacked them, without taking the initiative, and as a result, had a far greater number of men killed, besides the fact that they lost many artillery pieces. After defending Saint-Dizier, Wintzingerode left that town on the same evening and retreated to Bar-le-Duc, pursued by the French, whom, however, he beat off when they pressed upon him too closely.

== Aftermath ==
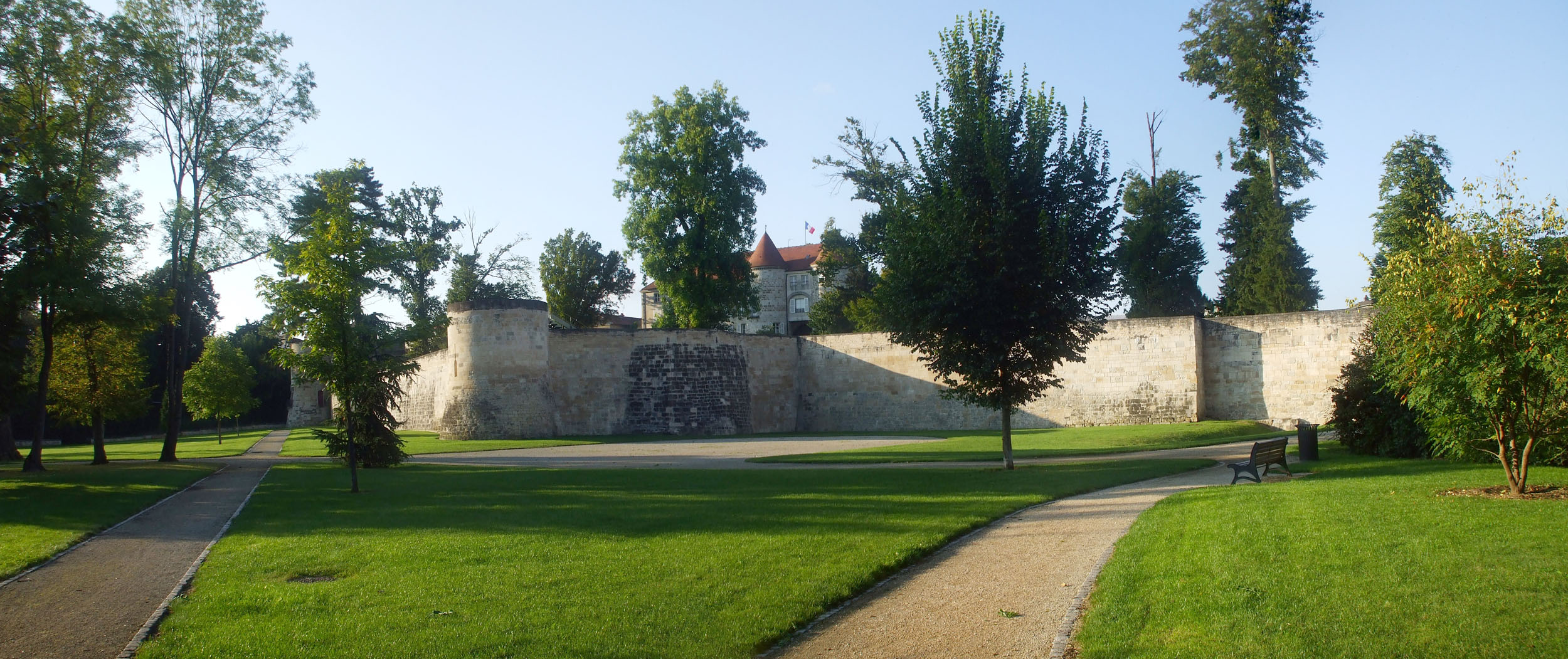
Castle of Saint-Dizier

From the Allied point-of-view, despite its unfavourable outcome, the battle was ultimately a success, resulting in an error by Napoleon that delayed and distracted him for three days. During this distraction his capital, Paris, was in imminent danger. Napoleon was convinced that Schwarzenberg's whole army was on his tracks, and Wintzingerode had taken care to strengthen this surmise by hiring rooms at Saint-Dizier for the Emperor of Russia and for the King of Prussia, and by giving out that his cavalry was merely the advance guard of the main army.

Napoleon, who learned all this from some of his devoted adherents in Saint-Dizier, halted at Vassy, recalled those troops which had already marched forward, and thought that he would fight a battle where the ground and the circumstances would be in his favour.

Even on the day after this action, Napoleon could not be brought to believe that he was mistaken, and had been striking at a shadow: He persisted in advancing against Vitry, where the small garrison prepared to meet the storm. There, however, he suddenly learnt of Marmont's and Mortier's defeat at the Battle of Fère-Champenoise and the advance of the Allies upon Paris: He now hastily collected his weary, half-famished troops, and made forced marches by Troyes, Sens, and Fontainebleau, to relieve his threatened capital.

== Sources ==
- Bodart, Gaston (1908). Militär-historisches Kriegs-Lexikon (1618-1905).
- Sketches of German Life, and Scenes from the War of Liberation, by Karl August Varnhagen von Ense, 1847: now in the public domain

Preceded by Battle of Fère-Champenoise	Napoleonic Wars; Battle of Saint-Dizier	Succeeded by Battle of Paris (1814)
