= Severac (disambiguation) =

Sévérac is a commune in the Loire-Atlantique department in western France.

Severac may also refer to:

== People ==
- Jacques Séverac (1902–1982), French film director and screenwriter
- Amaury de Sévérac (fl. 1422–1427), Marshal of France
- Déodat de Séverac (1872–1921), French composer
- Jordanus of Severac (fl. 1280–1330), European Catholic bishop in India

== Places ==
- Sévérac-d'Aveyron, a former commune in Aveyron, France
- Sévérac-le-Château, a former commune in Aveyron, France
  - Château de Sévérac
- Sévérac-l'Église, a former commune in Aveyron, France
- Laissac-Sévérac-l'Église, a commune in Aveyron, France
