= Vauchamps =

Vauchamps may refer to the following places in France:

- Vauchamps, Doubs, a commune in the Doubs department
- Vauchamps, Marne, a commune in the Marne department
