= Battle of Vauchamps =

1814 battle of the War of the Sixth Coalition

- Part of the Six Days' Campaign; the Campaign of France of the Sixth Coalition
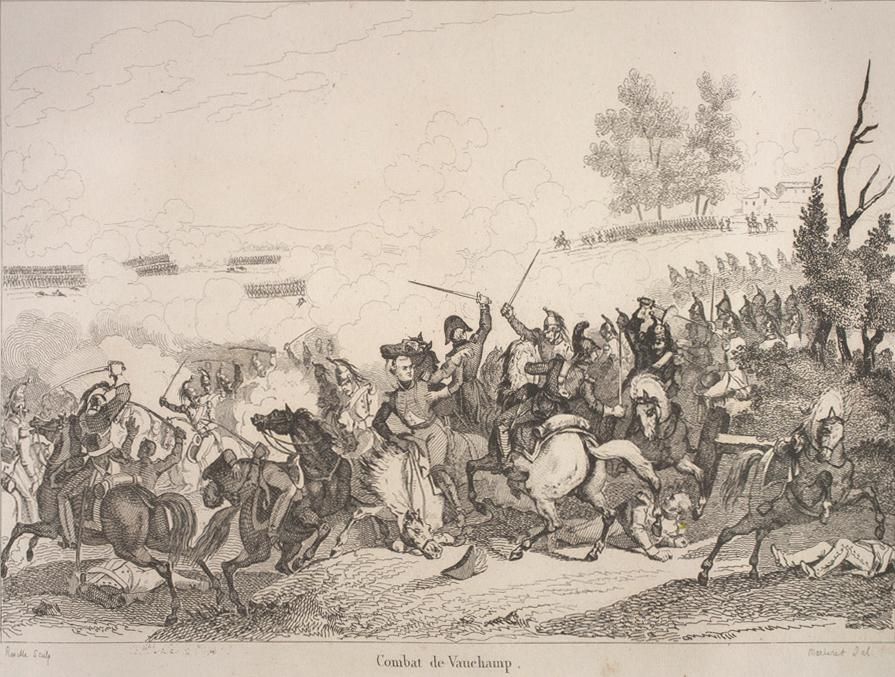
- Engraving
Date	14 February 1814
Location	Vauchamps, French Empire 48.8811°N 3.6164°E
Result	French victory

Belligerents
France	Prussia; Russia

Commanders and leaders
(First French Empire) Napoleon Bonaparte (First French Empire) Auguste de Marmont (First French Empire) Emmanuel de Grouchy	(Kingdom of Prussia) Gebhard Leberecht von Blücher (Kingdom of Prussia) Friedrich von Kleist (Russian Empire) Peter Kaptzevich

Strength
10,000 (Note: Only those engaged in the actual fighting. On the Prusso-Russian side, the "engaged" forces are not specified; all coalition corps, however, did engage in battle (see § Opposing forces and § Battle).)	21,500 (Note: 13,500; 8,000)

Casualties and losses
600 killed, wounded or captured	9,000–10,000 killed, wounded or captured (Note: Casualties include fighting withdrawal.: 5,500; 3,500; 15 guns)
- Location within France

War of the Sixth Coalition:
Campaign in north-east France
current battle
Napoleon in command
Napoleon not in command

The Battle of Vauchamps (14 February 1814) was the final major engagement of the Six Days Campaign of the War of the Sixth Coalition. It resulted in a part of the Grande Armée under Napoleon I defeating a superior Prussian and Russian force of the Army of Silesia under Field-marshal Gebhard Leberecht von Blücher. In the military career of Napoleon, this was one of his most outstanding tactical victories.

At the beginning of 1814, the armies of the French Empire, under the direct command of Emperor Napoleon I, were scrambling to defend Eastern France against the invading Coalition Armies. Despite fighting against vastly superior forces, Napoleon managed to score a few significant victories and, between 10 and 13 February repeatedly beat Blücher's Army of Silesia. On 13 February, reeling from his successive defeats, Blücher looked to disengage from Napoleon and instead manoeuvre with a part of his forces to fall upon the isolated VI Corps of Marshal Auguste de Marmont, who was defending Napoleon's rear. The Prussian commander attacked and pushed back Marmont late on 13 February. Nevertheless, the Emperor had read into his enemy's intentions and directed powerful forces to support Marmont.

On the morning of 14 February, Blücher, commanding a Prussian Corps and elements of two Russian Corps, resumed his attack against Marmont. The latter continued to fall back until he was reinforced. Napoleon arrived on the battlefield with strong combined-arms forces, which allowed the French to launch a determined counterattack and drive back the leading elements of the Army of Silesia. Blücher realized that he was facing the Emperor in person and decided to pull back and avoid another battle against Napoleon. In practice, Blücher's attempt to disengage proved extremely difficult to execute, as the Coalition force was by now in an advanced position, had virtually no cavalry present to cover its retreat and was facing an enemy who was ready to commit its numerous cavalry.

While the actual pitched battle was short, the French infantry, under Marshal Marmont, and most of all the cavalry, under General Emmanuel de Grouchy, launched a relentless pursuit that rode down the enemy. Retreating in slow-moving square formations in broad daylight and along some excellent cavalry terrain, the Coalition forces suffered very heavy losses, with several squares broken by the French cavalry. At nightfall, combat ceased and Blücher opted for an exhausting night march in order to take his remaining forces to safety.

== Context ==
On 13 February, having fought three successful actions in three days against the Prussian and Russian army at Champaubert, Montmirail and Château-Thierry, Napoleon was pursuing the defeated enemy. After his consecutive defeats, Field-marshal Blücher decided to disengage from Napoleon and move a significant force against the isolated French Army Corps of Marshal Marmont, at Étoges. Blücher knew that Marmont's Corps was weak and his plan was to destroy it and thus fall upon the rear of Napoleon's main force.

Still in pursuit of the debris of the enemy force, late on 13 February, Napoleon received reports that Marmont's Corps had been attacked and pushed out of his position at Étoges. The Emperor deduced that the enemy force before him would have to be a much reduced one and promptly decided to go to Marmont's aid. The Emperor left Château-Thierry on 14 February, towards 3 o'clock in the morning, leaving a small portion of his forces with Marshal Édouard Mortier, duc de Trévise, with orders to continue the pursuit of the enemy. Taking with him the cavalry of the Guard and Grouchy's Cavalry Reserve, Napoleon headed for the village of Vauchamps.

Meanwhile, late on 13 February, having successfully regrouped what forces he could muster at Bergères-lès-Vertus, Blücher had launched an attack against Marmont's single division, pushing him out of Étoges and advancing as planned towards Champaubert and Fromentières, in the rear of Napoleon's force. However, having read Blücher's intentions, Napoleon had given orders for a concentration of French forces in that very sector.

== Opposing forces ==
=== Army of Silesia ===
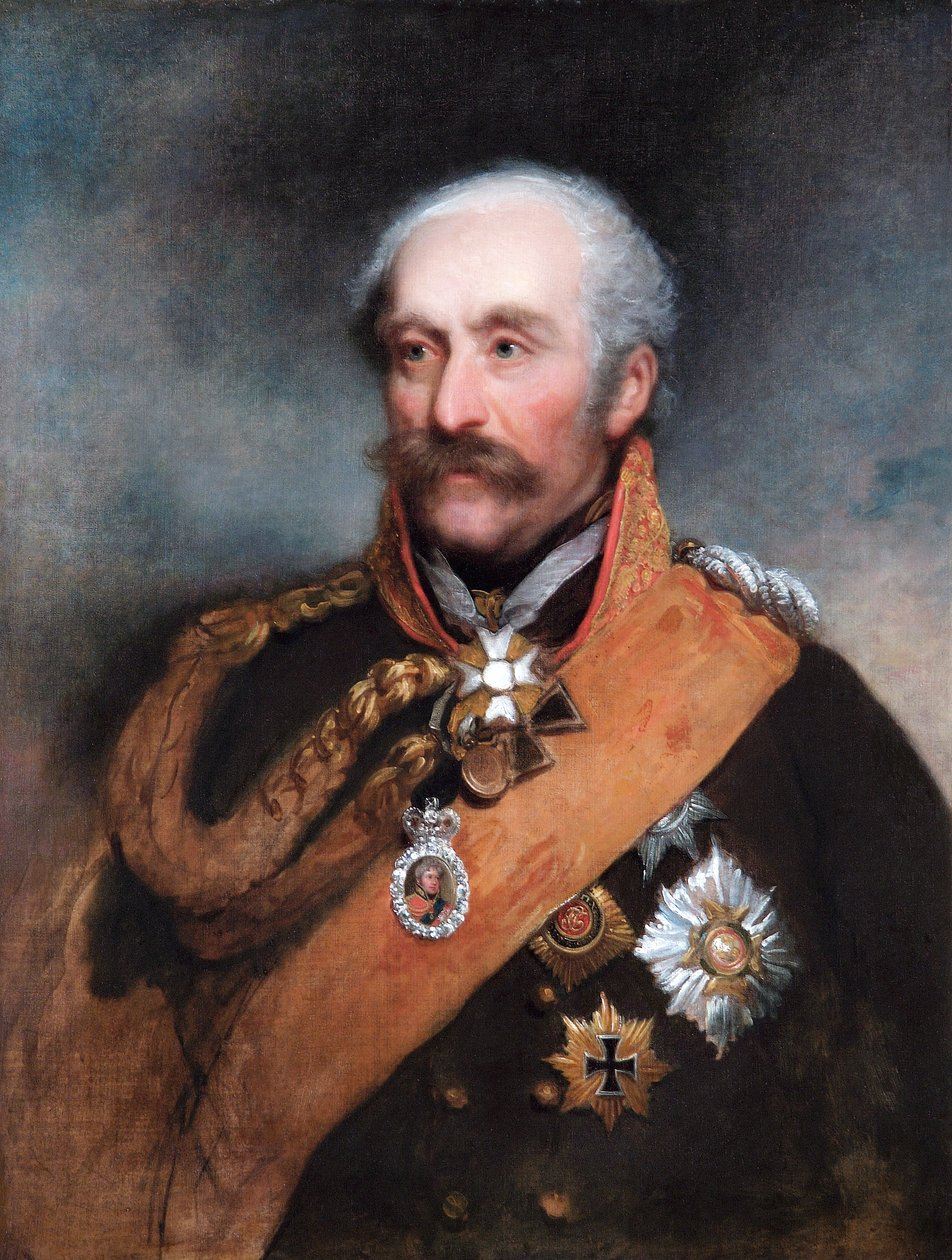
Field Marshal Gebhard Leberecht von Blücher, commander of the Army of Silesia.

During the battle of Vauchamps on 14 February, Prussian Field-Marshal Gebhard Leberecht von Blücher, commander of the combined Prusso-Russian Army of Silesia could count on 20,000 to 21,500 men, from three army corps: (Note: A Prussian brigade comprised several regiments and was roughly equivalent in strength to a French or Russian division.)

- II (Prussian) Corps, commanded by General Friedrich Graf Kleist von Nollendorf:
  - 10th brigade under George Dubislaw Ludwig von Pirch
  - 11th brigade under Hans Ernst Karl, Graf von Zieten
  - 12th brigade under Prince Augustus of Prussia
  - Cavalry brigade under von Hacke
  - Cavalry brigade under von Röder
  - Reserve artillery under Braun
- IX (Russian) Corps:
  - 9th division under Udom II
- X (Russian) Corps under General Peter Mikhailovich Kaptzevich:
  - 8th division under Prince Urusov (or Orosov)
  - 22nd division under Turchaninov

Kleist's II Corps numbered 13,500 men while Kaptzevich's X Corps counted 6,500. There were also 1,500 troops from IX Corps who survived the Battle of Champaubert. These were grouped into three or four temporary battalions and an artillery battery. The rump of IX Corps lost 600 men and all of its guns on the evening of 14 February. II Corps had eight 6-pound batteries and two 12-pound batteries. Each battery had eight guns or a total of 80 cannons. There was also a howitzer battery of unknown strength, with X Corps having three batteries attached.

=== Grande Armée ===
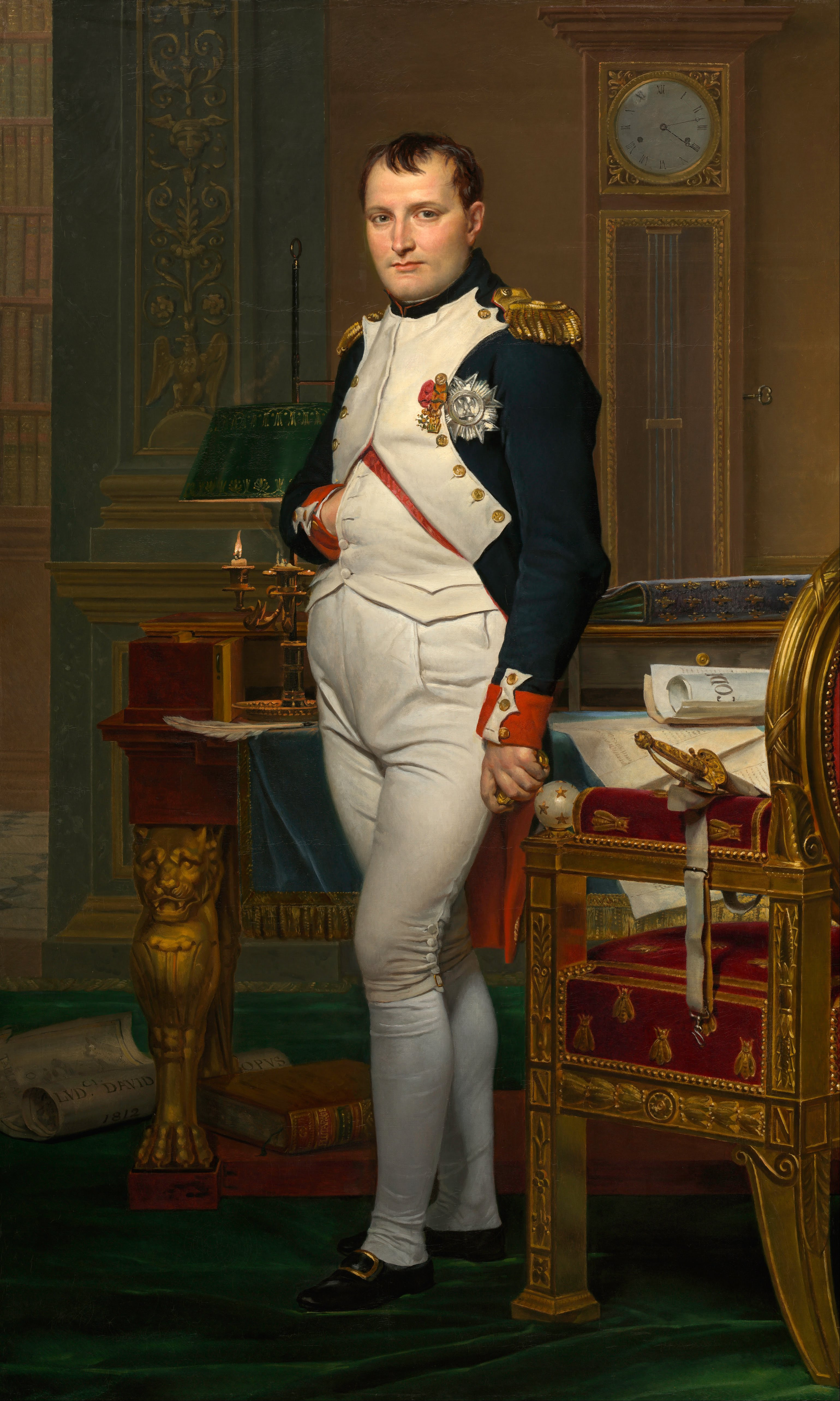
Napoleon Bonaparte, Emperor of the French, commander of the French forces

Napoleon had sent orders for a major concentration of forces, which resulted in a force of some 25,000 men being assembled in this sector. However, of these men, only 19,000 soldiers got to the battlefield in time, with no more than 10,000 men engaged in the actual fighting:

- VI Corps, commanded by Marshal of the Empire Auguste de Marmont:
  - 3rd Division under Joseph Lagrange
  - 8th Division under Étienne Pierre Sylvestre Ricard
  - Reinforcements temporarily attached: 7th division under Jean François Leval
- Cavalry, commanded by General Emmanuel de Grouchy:
  - Division Antoine Louis Decrest de Saint-Germain
  - Division Jean-Pierre Doumerc
  - Division Étienne Tardif de Pommeroux de Bordesoulle
- Guard cavalry, commanded by General Étienne de Nansouty:
  - 2nd Division under Charles, comte Lefebvre-Desnouettes,
  - 3rd Division under Louis Marie Levesque de Laferrière.
- Guard artillery under Antoine Drouot.
- Guard infantry, under Marshal, Prince of the Moskowa Michel Ney (Reinforcements not engaged):
  - 1st (Old Guard) division under Louis Friant,
  - 2nd (Young Guard) division under Philibert Jean-Baptiste Curial.

Grouchy's I Cavalry Corps and II Cavalry Corps, each of two divisions, numbered a combined 3,600 horsemen. The two Guard cavalry divisions together counted 3,300 troopers. The 1st Old Guard Division had 4,000 men and the 2nd Old Guard Division had 3,000. The 1st Young Guard Division was made up of 4,000 soldiers while the 2nd Young Guard Division had 2,500 troops. Marmont's two divisions could muster only 3,000 men. Jean François Leval's 7th Division comprised 4,500 soldiers. Of these forces, only the cavalry, Marmont's infantry and one battalion of the Old Guard were actually engaged in the fighting. The others were marching along behind.

== Battle ==
Having begun to push back the feeble French forces from Marmont's VI's Corps the day before, Blücher occupied Champaubert early on 14 February, sending his vanguard forward, as far as the village of Fromentières and then Vauchamps. Marmont, commanding only the Lagrange division and 800 men from the Ricard division, had cautiously pulled his men back towards Montmirail, where he began to receive reinforcements. Towards 9 o'clock in the morning, Blücher set Zieten's brigade and some cavalry in motion from Vauchamps towards Montmirail. To their surprise, Marmont's men didn't give ground this time and vigorously counterattacked, pushing Zieten's advance guard back into the village of Vauchamps. The accompanying Prussian cavalry was dispersed by a violent French cannonade. With now both brigades of Ricard's division available, Marmont launched these men against the Prussian position at Vauchamps, with the 1st brigade on his right, advancing under the cover of the Beaumont forest, south of the Montmirail-Vauchamps road and the 2nd brigade on his left, north of the road, advancing frontally towards the position. Marmont also had with him his own escort cavalry squadron and four élite Imperial Guard duty squadrons from the Emperor's own escort, under general Lion. Marmont's leftmost brigade entered Vauchamps, but, with the village heavily invested with Zieten's Prussian defenders, the Frenchmen were soon repulsed, with the Prussians in pursuit. Marshal Marmont then launched his five squadrons to the rescue and the cavalry promptly forced the Prussians back to the village, with one of their battalions taken prisoner, after taking refuge in an isolated farm.

Zieten then decided to pull back his forces towards the village of Fromentières. There, Zieten was joined by Generals Kleist and Kapsevitch, who, having heard the sound of the guns, had begun to move their respective Army Corps in that direction, coming from Champaubert. The French also moved forward, with Marmont's two divisions (Lagrange and Ricard) in pursuit of Zieten, along the road to Fromentières. Marmont was now supported on his left by General Grouchy, who had just arrived on the field of battle with the divisions of Saint-Germain and Doumerc, moving past the village of Janvilliers, in order to cut off Zieten's retreat. Further French reinforcements were now available, this time on Marmont's right: the division of Leval, who had been steadily moving up the valley of the Petit Morin river, in a bid to outflank the Prussians. With the French Imperial Guard artillery now also deployed and firing at them, Zieten's Prussians drew back in good order, and formed in squares to fend off Grouchy's cavalry. Towards 2 o'clock in the afternoon, after assessing the situation, Blücher realised that he was facing Napoleon himself and thus decided to immediately withdraw. He ordered all of his forces to retreat through Champaubert and directed a part of his artillery to safety, towards Étoges.

== Pursuit ==
With the Coalition forces now in full retreat, Marmont received orders to aggressively pursue the enemy, knowing that he could count on his two infantry divisions, plus that of Leval, as well as on the support of General Drouot's Guard artillery, on Nansouty's Guard cavalry on his right and on Grouchy's two cavalry divisions on his left. Following Marmont at a short distance were further reinforcements, two Guard infantry divisions (Friant and Curial) under the command of Marshal Ney and with them was Napoleon himself. Napoleon was followed by an additional "Young Guard" division, under General Meunier, which the Emperor had taken with him when he left Château-Thierry early that morning.

The French cavalry had been hindered in its movements by the broken terrain and thus far unable to really bother Zieten's infantry squares. Consequently, Blücher was able to lead an exemplary retreat up to Fromentières and Janvilliers. However, once past these villages, the terrain became flat and even, proper for cavalry action, and now, with the increasingly aggressive action of the enemy cavalry against his flank and rear, Zieten and his brigade became increasingly isolated. Grouchy, with the divisions of Doumerc and Saint-Germain was now boldly menacing Zieten's right, while on his left, the Prussian general saw Nansouty's Guard cavalry (Laferrière-Levesque's division, plus the four service squadrons, under Lefebvre-Desnouettes). Zieten's brigade was finally cut off from the rest of the army and charged violently by Grouchy's cuirassiers, who broke the infantry squares and took no less than 2,000 prisoners, with the rest of the brigade routed.

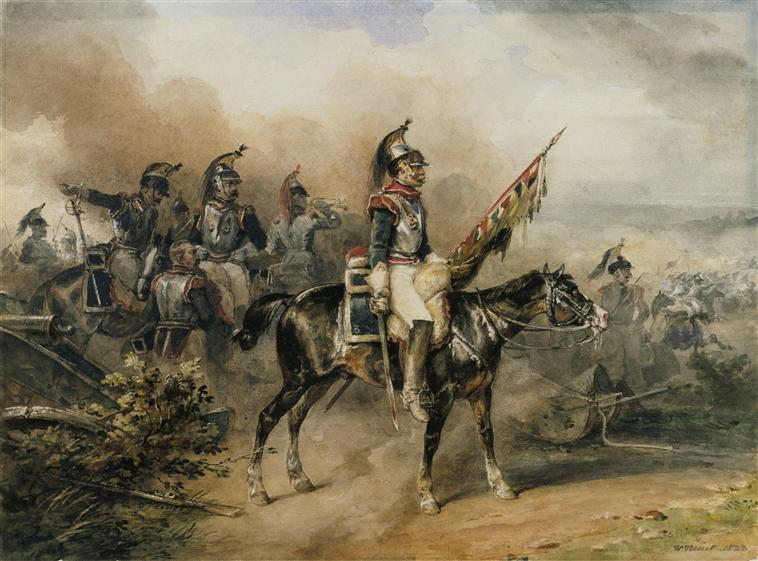
French cuirassiers (troopers of the 3rd regiment) during a charge. General of Division Marquis de Grouchy led his heavy cavalry brilliantly at Vauchamps, breaking and routing a number of enemy infantry squares.

Abandoning his position at Fromentières, where Marmont's infantry had just begun to irrupt, Blücher ordered the continuation of the retreat towards Champaubert and Étoges, with Kleist's Corps on the left, south of the road and Kaptzevitch's Corps on the right, north of the road. Again taking advantage from the flat terrain, Grouchy was able to advance rapidly and fall onto the rear of the Coalition infantry squares, which were now slowly withdrawing in echelon and efficiently using the terrain to take shelter from the artillery bombardment. With night approaching and their retreat towards Étoges now barred by enemy cavalry, the Prussian squares began to lose cohesion. Spotting this weakness, Grouchy, who had been reinforced by Bordesoulle's division, energetically launched his three divisions against the Coalition squares, dispersing a number of them, with these men fleeing in disorder to take refuge in the Étoges forest. The old Blücher, who had been bravely exposing himself to great danger in order to boost the morale his men, was almost taken prisoner, together with his chief of staff, Gneisenau, Generals Kleist, Kapsevitch and Prince Augustus of Prussia.

Only just escaping capture, Blücher crossed the forest of Vertus and took up positions at Étoges with Prince Urusov's division, which had been left there in reserve. Russian General Udom, with 1,800 men and 15 cannon, was instructed to cover the position, by occupying the park at Étoges. Udom's men were exhausted after the long retreat and fighting and, seeing that night had fallen, thought themselves in safety. However, Doumerc's cuirassiers, formed unseen in the night, surprised these men and a single charge was enough to send the panicked men fleeing. Prince Urusov, 600 men and eight artillery pieces were captured during this action, with the French sailors' regiment from Lagrange's division subsequently entering the village of Étoges. Blücher abandoned this position too and made a hasty retreat towards Vertus and Bergères. He then opted for a speedy night march and the next day he managed to bring his remaining men to Châlons, where he was joined by Yorck's and Sacken's corps.

== Result ==
The battle was actually no more than a very long cavalry pursuit and was a very costly defeat for Blücher's "Army of Silesia", which lost as much as 10,000 men, during this day. French author Jean-Pierre Mir states that the Prussian Corps of Kleist had 3,500 men out of action (killed, wounded and missing), as well as 2,000 prisoners. According to this author, the Russian Corps had around 3,500 men, killed, wounded or missing and also lost 15 cannons and 10 flags. Historian Alain Pigeard places overall losses of the Army of Silesia throughout this day between 9,000 and 10,000 men but the detail of these losses seems to suggest lighter casualties. Pigeard speaks of only 1,250 men killed, wounded or missing and 2,000 prisoners for the Prussians, and of 2,000 men lost for the Russians. Since Pigeard asserts that these casualties occurred during the pursuit, it is possible that these figures do not take into account the casualties incurred during the initial actions of this battle (one battalion of Zieten's brigade captured, plus the 2,000 prisoners taken during Grouchy's and Nansouty's joint action against Zieten). According to Pigeard, the French registered very light casualties of around 600 men.

Military Historian Jacques Garnier, analysing the battle in Jean Tulard's Dictionnaire Napoléon, notes that only the muddy, sodden ground, hampering an efficient deployment of the French artillery and infantry, prevented a much more emphatic victory. He also notes that after Vauchamps, Napoleon was able to safely turn south and fall at the Battle of Mormant upon the "Army of Bohemia", commanded by Prince of Schwarzenberg.

== Sources ==
- Mir, Jean-Pierre (2009). Hanau & Montmirail: la Garde donne et vainc. ISBN 978-2-35250-086-5.
- Nafziger, George (2015). The End of Empire: Napoleon's 1814 Campaign. Solihull, UK: Helion & Company. ISBN 978-1-909982-96-3.
- Nafziger, George (1994). "French and Allied Forces, Battle of Vauchamps, 14 February 1814" (PDF). United States Army Combined Arms Center. Archived from the original (PDF) on 10 September 2016.
- Pigeard, Alain (2004). Dictionnaire des batailles de Napoléon: 1796-1815. ISBN 2-84734-073-4.
- Thoumas, Charles Antoine. Les grands cavaliers du Premier Empire. Notices biographiques. S rie 2: Nansouty, Pajol, Milhaud, Cur ly, Fournier-Sarlov ze, Chamorin, Sainte-Croix, Exelmans, Marulaz, Franceschi-Delonne. ISBN 978-0-543-96047-4.
- Tulard, Jean (1999). Dictionnaire Napoléon: A - H. ISBN 978-2-213-60485-5.

Preceded by Battle of Château-Thierry (1814)	Napoleonic Wars; Battle of Vauchamps	Succeeded by Battle of Garris
