= Suippes =

- Commune
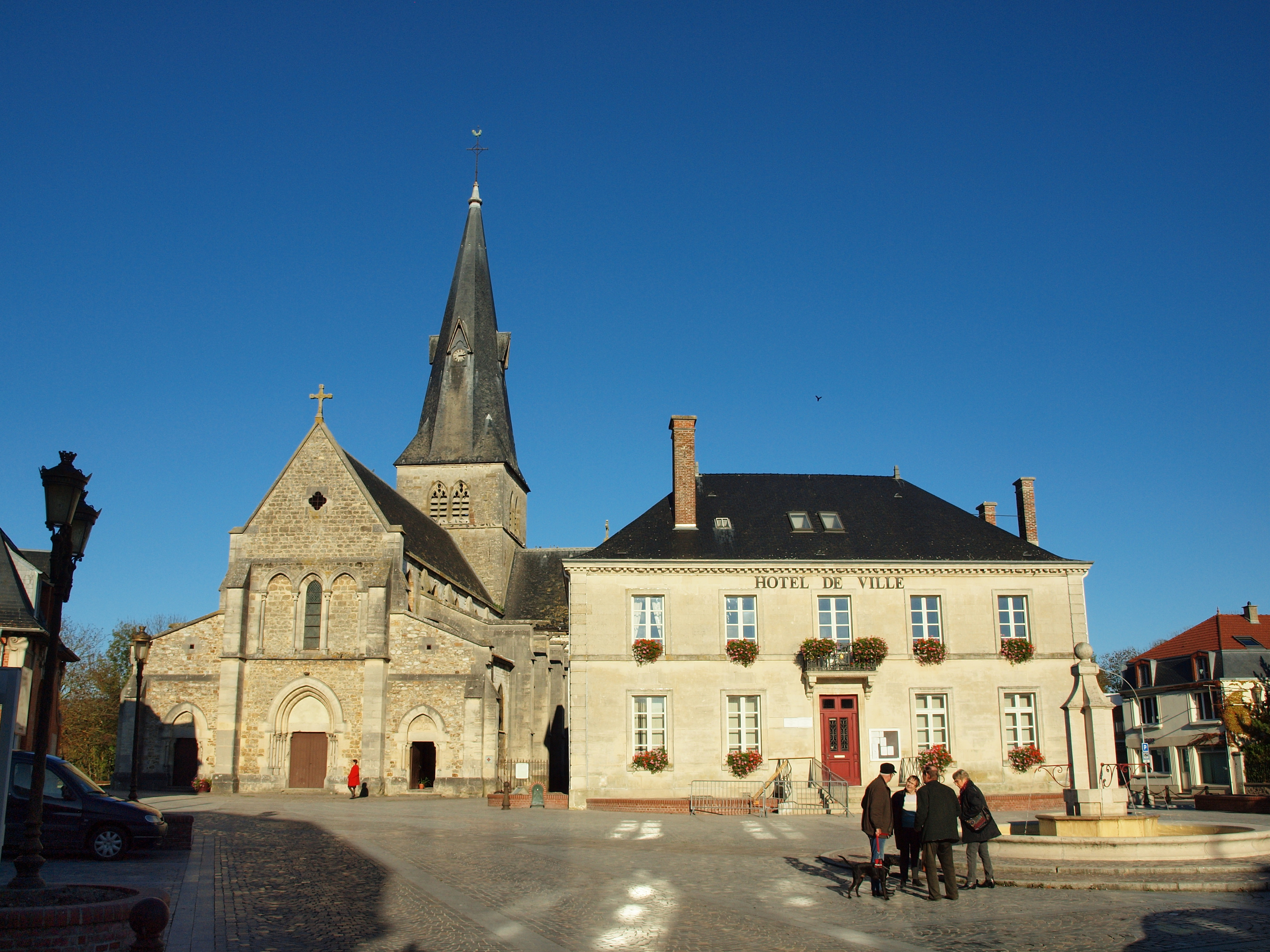
- The church and town hall in Suippes
- Location of Suippes
- Location within France Location within Grand Est
- Coordinates: 49°07′51″N 4°31′57″E
- Country: France
- Region: Grand Est
- Department: Marne
- Arrondissement: Châlons-en-Champagne
- Canton: Argonne Suippe et Vesle
- Intercommunality: Région de Suippes

Government
  - Mayor (2020–2026): François Collart
- Area^{1}: 42.25 km^{2} (16.31 sq mi)
- Elevation: 135 m (443 ft)
- Highest elevation: 196 m (643 ft)
- Lowest elevation: 129 m (423 ft)
- Population (2023): 3,938
  - Density: 93.21/km^{2} (241.4/sq mi)
- Time zone: UTC+01:00 (CET)
  - Summer (DST): UTC+02:00 (CEST)
- INSEE/Postal code: 51559 /51600
- ^{1} French Land Register data, which excludes lakes, ponds, glaciers > 1 km^{2} (0.386 sq mi or 247 acres) and river estuaries.

Suippes (French pronunciation: [sɥip]) is a commune in the Marne department in north-eastern France. It was part of the so-called la Champagne pouilleuse, a region battered by conflict during World War I. In the early months of the war, British soldiers were deployed here and were to march to Châlons-sur-Marne to fight the First Battle of the Marne. In October 1918, the United States also deployed a brigade in the area and was assigned as Fourth French Army reserve. The commune was pillaged and razed by the Germans in the same way they attacked Heiltz-le-Maurupt, Marfaux, Fromentieres, and Esternay.

The commune is home to France's 40th Artillery Regiment and was once home to 15th Artillery Regiment which operated the nuclear Pluton missile as part of France's deterrent during the Cold War.

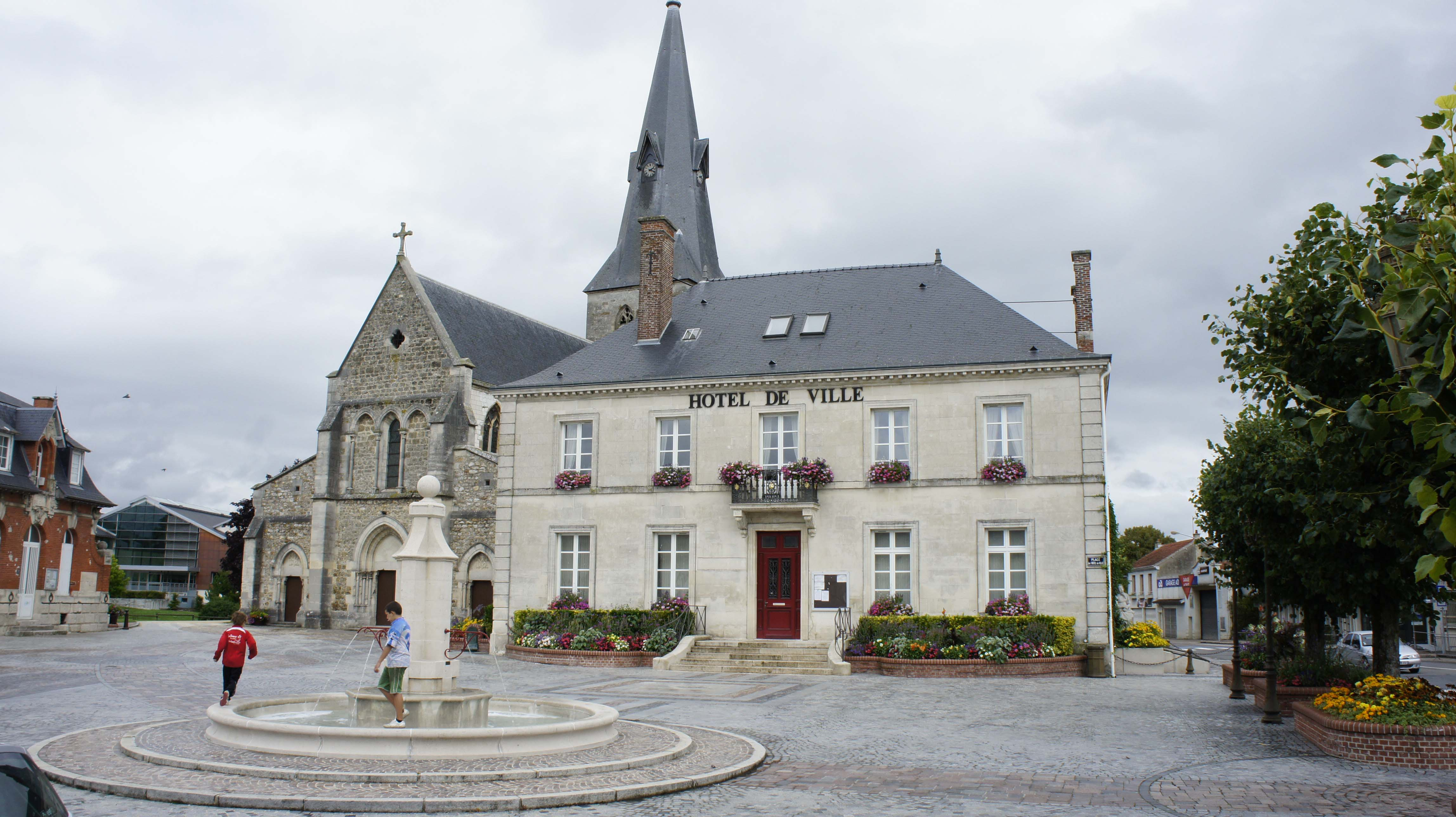

== Geography ==
The commune is traversed by the Suippe river, from which it takes its name.

== Population ==
Historical population
Year	Pop.	±% p.a.
1968	3,270	—
1975	3,305	+0.15%
1982	3,069	−1.05%
1990	3,106	+0.15%
1999	3,497	+1.33%
2007	3,791	+1.01%
2012	4,019	+1.17%
2017	3,913	−0.53%
2023	3,938	+0.11%
Source: INSEE
