= Maison de Jeanne =

15th century house in France

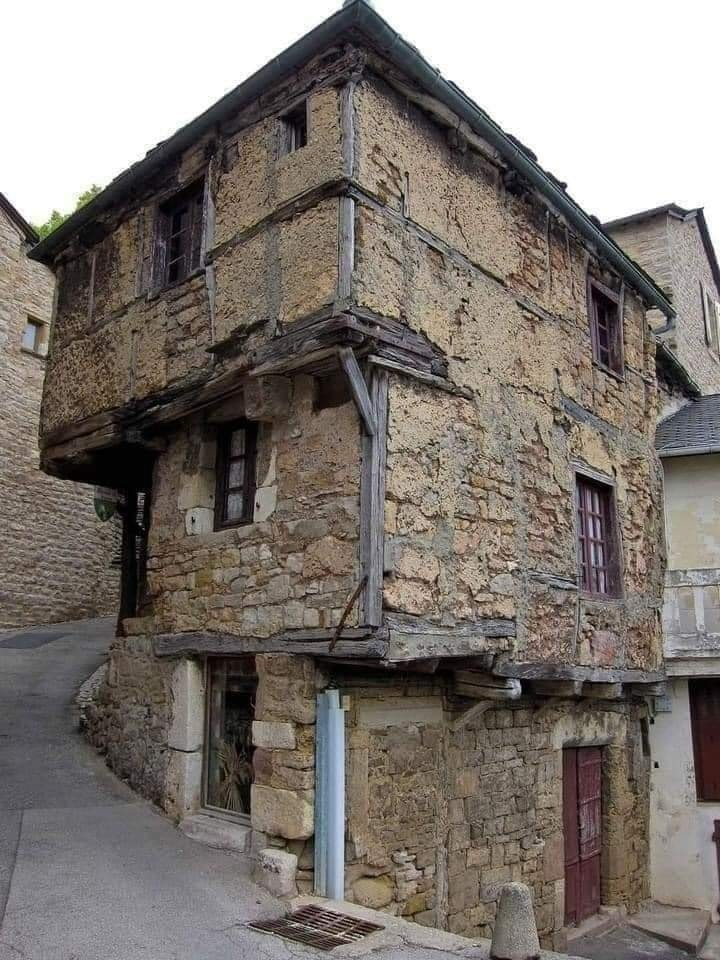
- The building before renovation

General information
- Location: 10, rue de la rue Belvezet, Sévérac-le-Château,, Aveyron, France
- Coordinates: 44.3219°N 3.0689°E
- Opened: 15th century
- Renovated: 2018
- Owner: Municipality of Sévérac-d'Aveyron (1995)

Technical details
- Material: Timber, stone and Cob

Renovating team
- Architect: Philippe Blondin
- Main contractor: Muzzarelli company (Masonry); Drulhet company (Carpentry and Electrical; Molinié company (plumbing)

Maison de Jeanne (French pronunciation: [mɛzɔ̃ də ʒan], lit. 'Jeanne's House') is a 15th-century house in Sévérac-le-Château, Aveyron, France. It was named for the last known owner of the building and is thought to be one of the oldest houses in Aveyron. The unique appearance of the structure is due to the larger dimensions of the upper floors, which look large compared to the smaller footprint of the first floor.

The timber frame and cob structure was dated based on dendochronology to the spring of 1478 the earliest by Christophe Perrault. It was vacant since the 1970s and it was purchased by the municipality of Sévérac in 1995. The building was renovated in 2019.

Jeanne's House became famous on the internet, described with enthusiasm but without foundation as the oldest house of Aveyron or even France.

== History ==
The building was constructed in the 1400s and is assumed to be one of the oldest house in the department of the Aveyron. In 2018, the house was dated through a dendrochronology analysis by Christophe Perrault who directs the Center for Studies in Dendrochronology; experts took samples of corings within the timbers which were used to build the structure. Through the process the home was dated to the spring of 1478. The name of the home comes from the last occupant of the home: an artist named Jeanne. The building has been unoccupied since the 1970s.

Le Figaro attributes the unusual design of the building to the local tax laws at the time of construction, suggesting that they were based on the floorplan of the building and that the original owner built the upper floors wider and larger than the ground floor. The structure may also be a result of jettying, a common practice in French architecture in the 13th to the 16th centuries, which prevents the floor from bowing and makes a building more structurally sound.

The house was purchased by the municipality of Sévérac in 1995 and restoration and repair work was planned.

Jeanne's House became famous following the publication of the photograph of a tourist from the United States on May 6, 2017, on the image hosting site Imgur. It attracted the attention of more than 1.5 million people in two days. The house was then described on social networks with enthusiasm but without foundation as built between the 12th century and the 13th century, and was alternatively presented as the oldest house of the department of the Aveyron or of France or even of the world.

== Design ==
The home was constructed with a timber frame and from walls made of cob. The home was designed with larger upper floors overhanging a smaller footprint. The building has a ground floor, two upper storeys and a vaulted cellar containing feed troughs, which indicate that the original owners lived with their animals on the lower floor. The exterior of the home is clad in stone.

In 2019, repairs and renovations on the building began. The renovations were supervised by architect Philippe Blondin. The roof was originally slate tiles, and each roof tile was removed and measured by Serge Causse, and replacements were cut and sized. The exterior masonry work was completed by the Muzzarelli company. The Drulhet company handled the carpentry, and the electricity; plumbing work was completed by the Molinié company. Authentic lime plaster was used in the interior of the house.
