= Laissac =

Commune in Aveyron, France

- Part of Laissac-Sévérac-l'Église
- Coat of arms
- Location of Laissac
- Location within France Location within Occitanie
- Coordinates: 44°22′54″N 2°49′24″E
- Country: France
- Region: Occitania
- Department: Aveyron
- Arrondissement: Rodez
- Canton: Lot et Palanges
- Commune: Laissac-Sévérac-l'Église
- Area^{1}: 20.21 km^{2} (7.80 sq mi)
- Elevation: 600 m (2,000 ft)
- Highest elevation: 923 m (3,028 ft)
- Lowest elevation: 569 m (1,867 ft)
- Population (2019): 1,728
  - Density: 85.50/km^{2} (221.4/sq mi)
- Time zone: UTC+01:00 (CET)
  - Summer (DST): UTC+02:00 (CEST)
- Postal code: 12310
- ^{1} French Land Register data, which excludes lakes, ponds, glaciers > 1 km^{2} (0.386 sq mi or 247 acres) and river estuaries.

Laissac (French pronunciation: [lɛsak]) is a former commune in the Aveyron department in southern France. On 1 January 2016, it was merged into the new commune of Laissac-Sévérac-l'Église. It is located by the river Aveyron and National Highway 88 between Lapanouse and Rodez.

== Population ==
Historical population
Year	Pop.	±% p.a.
1962	1,257	—
1968	1,275	+0.24%
1975	1,364	+0.97%
1982	1,476	+1.13%
1990	1,395	−0.70%
1999	1,467	+0.56%
2019	1,728	+0.82%
Source: EHESS and INSEE

== See also ==
- Communes of the Aveyron department
