= Buzeins =

Part of Sévérac-d'Aveyron in Occitanie, France

- Part of Sévérac-d'Aveyron
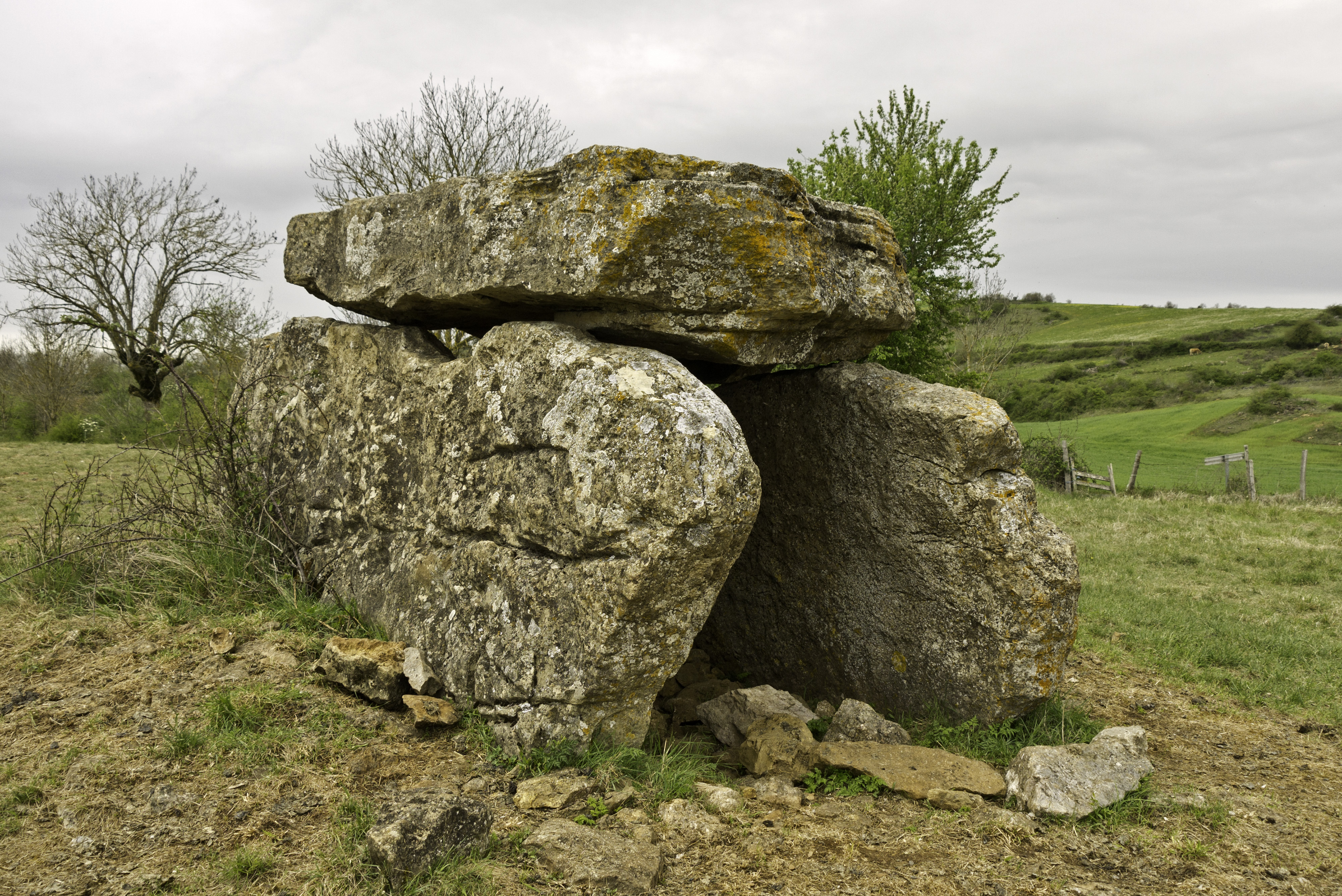
- The Dolmen of Galitorte
- Location of Buzeins
- Location within France Location within Occitanie
- Coordinates: 44°22′27″N 2°58′20″E
- Country: France
- Region: Occitania
- Department: Aveyron
- Arrondissement: Millau
- Canton: Tarn et Causses
- Commune: Sévérac-d'Aveyron
- Area^{1}: 21.59 km^{2} (8.34 sq mi)
- Elevation: 750 m (2,460 ft)
- Highest elevation: 895 m (2,936 ft)
- Lowest elevation: 612 m (2,008 ft)
- Population (2023): 202
  - Density: 9.36/km^{2} (24.2/sq mi)
- Time zone: UTC+01:00 (CET)
  - Summer (DST): UTC+02:00 (CEST)
- Postal code: 12150
- ^{1} French Land Register data, which excludes lakes, ponds, glaciers > 1 km^{2} (0.386 sq mi or 247 acres) and river estuaries.

Buzeins (Languedocien: Busens) is a former commune in the Aveyron department in southern France. On 1 January 2016, it was merged into the new commune of Sévérac-d'Aveyron.

== See also ==
- Communes of the Aveyron department
