= Bouclans =

- Commune
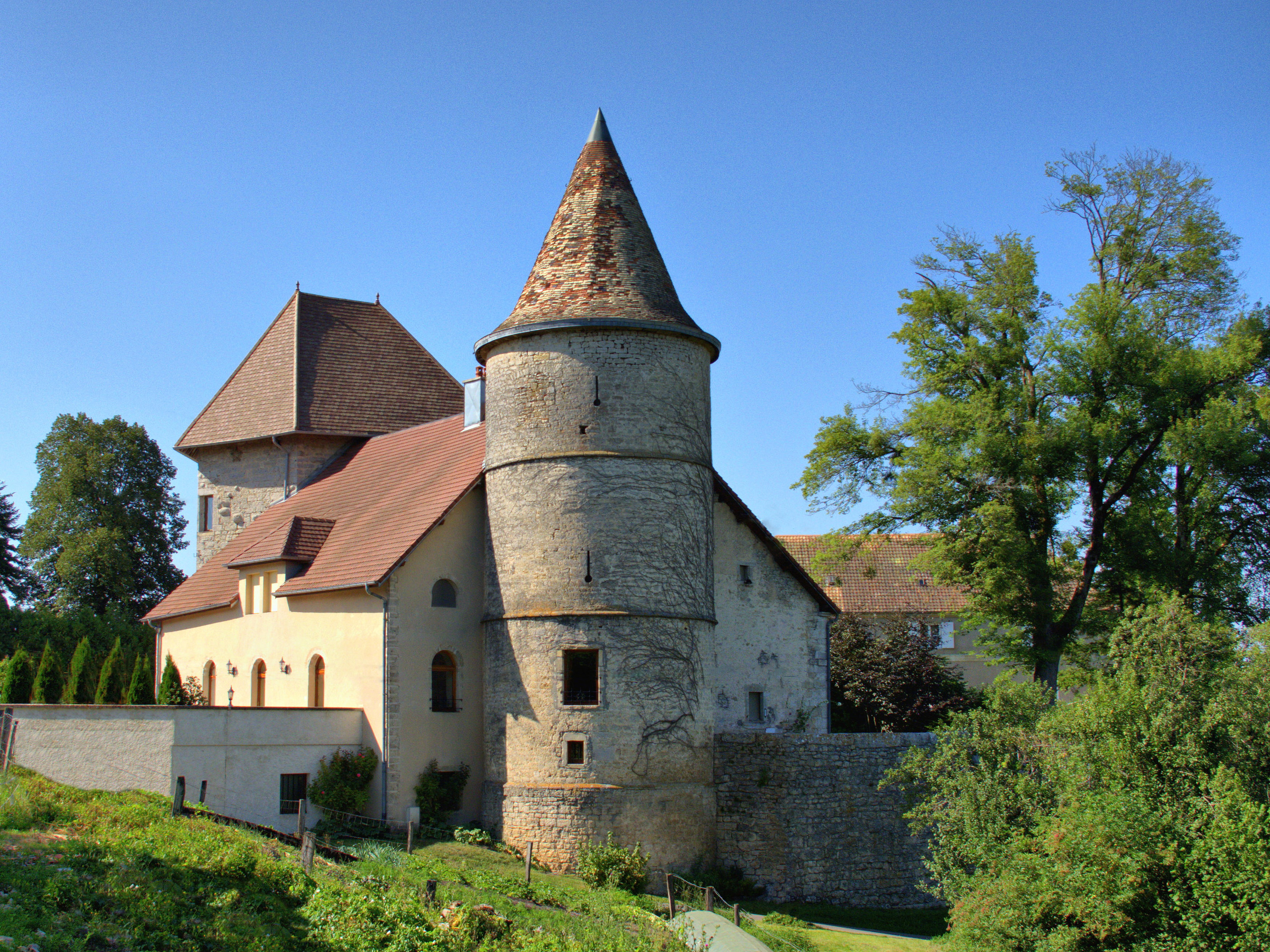
- The chateau in Bouclans

- Coat of arms
- Location of Bouclans
- Location within France Location within Bourgogne-Franche-Comté
- Coordinates: 47°14′53″N 6°14′14″E
- Country: France
- Region: Bourgogne-Franche-Comté
- Department: Doubs
- Arrondissement: Besançon
- Canton: Baume-les-Dames
- Intercommunality: Portes du Haut-Doubs

Government
  - Mayor (2020–2026): Martial Hirtzel
- Area^{1}: 24.34 km^{2} (9.40 sq mi)
- Highest elevation: 514 m (1,686 ft)
- Lowest elevation: 397 m (1,302 ft)
- Population (2023): 1,053
  - Density: 43.26/km^{2} (112.0/sq mi)
- Time zone: UTC+01:00 (CET)
  - Summer (DST): UTC+02:00 (CEST)
- INSEE/Postal code: 25078 /25360
- ^{1} French Land Register data, which excludes lakes, ponds, glaciers > 1 km^{2} (0.386 sq mi or 247 acres) and river estuaries.

Bouclans (French pronunciation: [buklɑ̃]) is a commune in the Doubs department in the Bourgogne-Franche-Comté region in eastern France. On 1 January 2018, the former commune of Vauchamps was merged into Bouclans.

== Population ==
Population data refer to the area corresponding with the commune as of January 2025.

Historical population
Year	Pop.	±% p.a.
1968	508	—
1975	638	+3.31%
1982	845	+4.10%
1990	867	+0.32%
1999	974	+1.30%
2007	1,077	+1.26%
2012	1,099	+0.41%
2017	1,073	−0.48%
2023	1,053	−0.31%
Source: INSEE

== See also ==
- Communes of the Doubs department
