= Manheulles =

- Commune
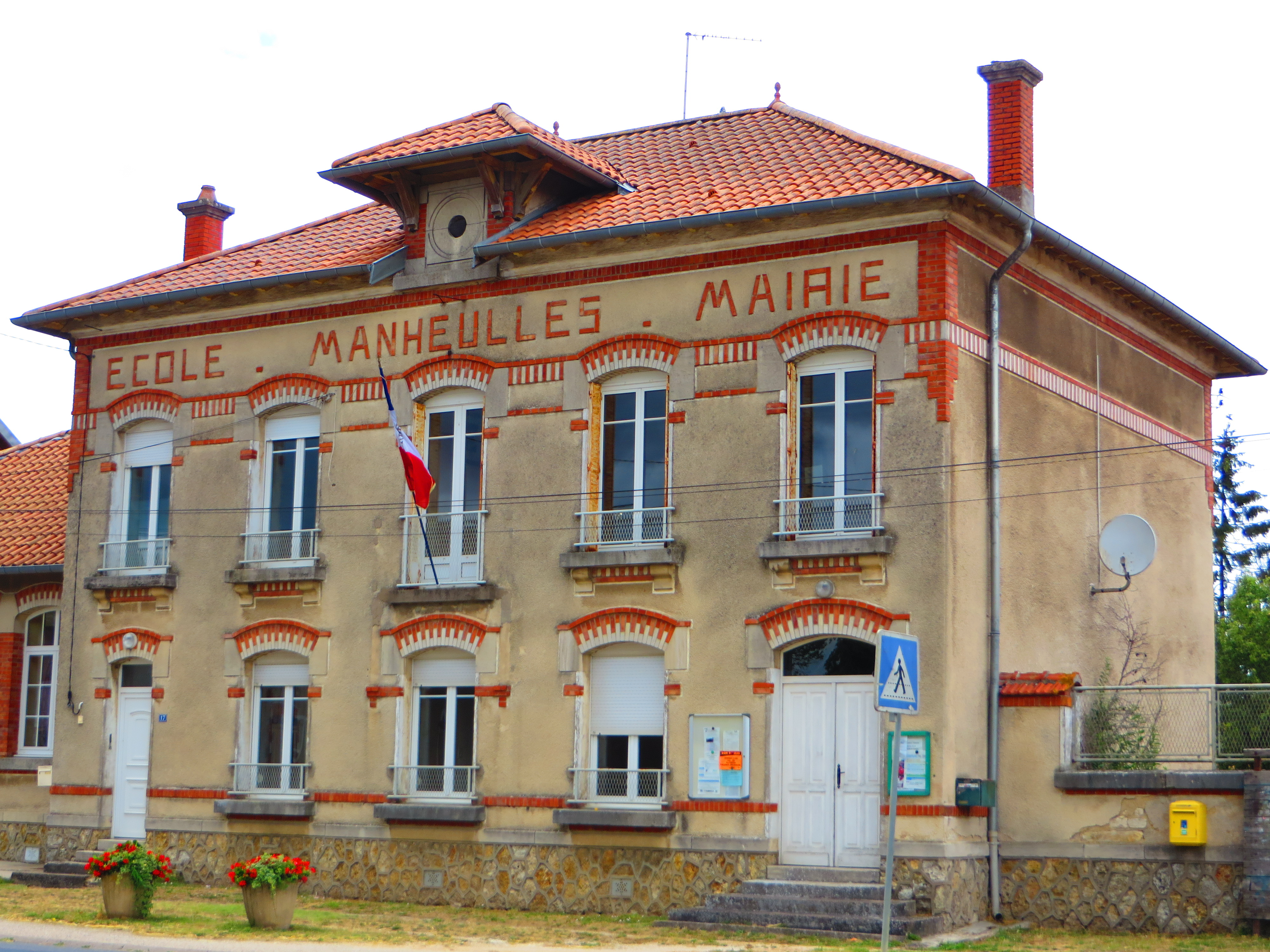
- The town hall in Manheulles
- Location of Manheulles
- Location within France Location within Grand Est
- Coordinates: 49°06′45″N 5°35′53″E
- Country: France
- Region: Grand Est
- Department: Meuse
- Arrondissement: Verdun
- Canton: Étain
- Intercommunality: Territoire de Fresnes-en-Woëvre

Government
  - Mayor (2020–2026): Michel Doladille
- Area^{1}: 10.45 km^{2} (4.03 sq mi)
- Elevation: 240 m (790 ft)
- Highest elevation: 257 m (843 ft)
- Lowest elevation: 210 m (690 ft)
- Population (2023): 156
  - Density: 14.9/km^{2} (38.7/sq mi)
- Time zone: UTC+01:00 (CET)
  - Summer (DST): UTC+02:00 (CEST)
- INSEE/Postal code: 55317 /55160
- ^{1} French Land Register data, which excludes lakes, ponds, glaciers > 1 km^{2} (0.386 sq mi or 247 acres) and river estuaries.

Manheulles (French pronunciation: [manœl]) is a commune in the Meuse department in Grand Est in north-eastern France.

== Born in Manheulles ==
- Auguste Desgodins (1826–1913), French missionary in China and Tibet

== See also ==
- Communes of the Meuse department
