= Lapanouse =

Part of Sévérac-d'Aveyron in Occitanie, France

- Part of Sévérac-d'Aveyron
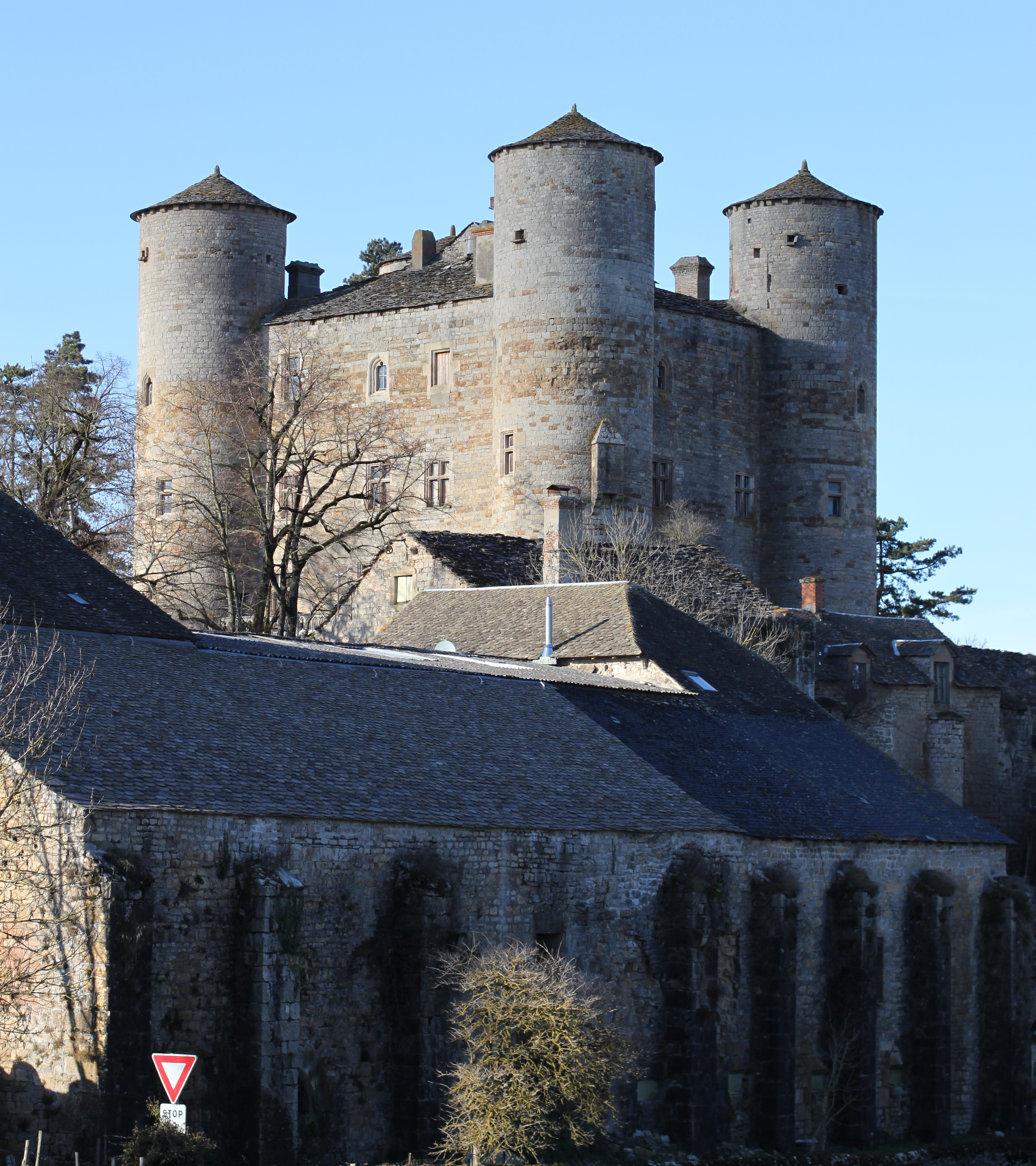
- The Château of Loupiac
- Location of Lapanouse
- Location within France Location within Occitanie
- Coordinates: 44°20′12″N 3°01′57″E
- Country: France
- Region: Occitania
- Department: Aveyron
- Arrondissement: Millau
- Canton: Tarn et Causses
- Commune: Sévérac-d'Aveyron
- Area^{1}: 27.19 km^{2} (10.50 sq mi)
- Elevation: 650 m (2,130 ft)
- Highest elevation: 923 m (3,028 ft)
- Lowest elevation: 630 m (2,070 ft)
- Population (2023): 750
  - Density: 28/km^{2} (71/sq mi)
- Time zone: UTC+01:00 (CET)
  - Summer (DST): UTC+02:00 (CEST)
- Postal code: 12150
- ^{1} French Land Register data, which excludes lakes, ponds, glaciers > 1 km^{2} (0.386 sq mi or 247 acres) and river estuaries.

Lapanouse (French pronunciation: [lapanuz]; Occitan: La Panosa) is a former commune in the Aveyron department in southern France. On 1 January 2016, it was merged into the new commune of Sévérac-d'Aveyron.

== See also ==
- Communes of the Aveyron department
