= Sévérac-le-Château =

Part of Sévérac-d'Aveyron in Occitanie, France

Sévérac-le-Château Severac del Castèl (Occitan)
- Part of Sévérac-d'Aveyron
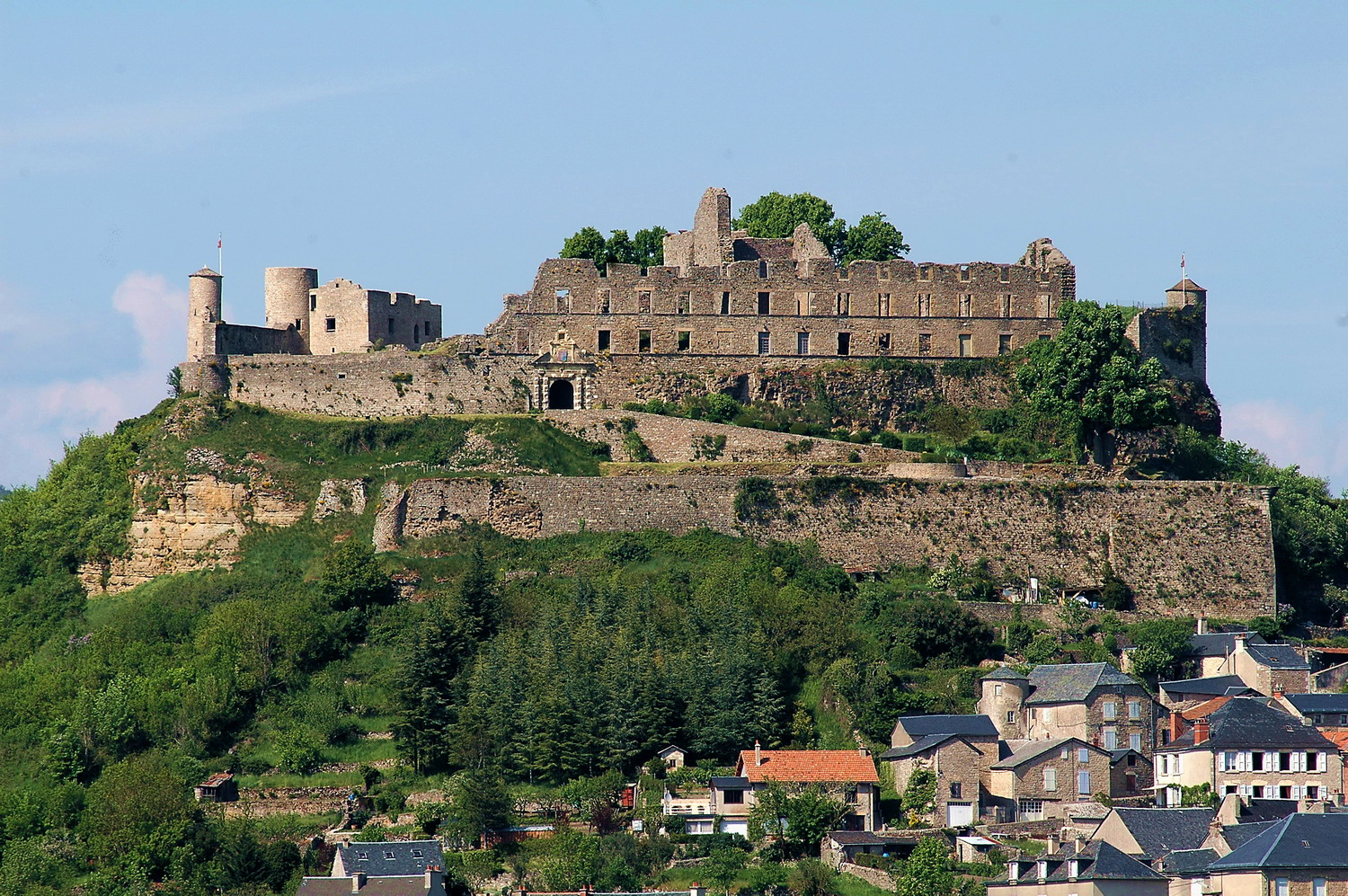
- The Château of Sévérac-le-Château

- Coat of arms
- Location of Sévérac-le-Château
- Location within France Location within Occitanie
- Coordinates: 44°19′19″N 3°04′17″E
- Country: France
- Region: Occitania
- Department: Aveyron
- Arrondissement: Millau
- Canton: Tarn et Causses
- Commune: Sévérac-d'Aveyron
- Area^{1}: 108.42 km^{2} (41.86 sq mi)
- Highest elevation: 1,091 m (3,579 ft)
- Lowest elevation: 454 m (1,490 ft)
- Population (2021): 2,418
  - Density: 22.30/km^{2} (57.76/sq mi)
- Time zone: UTC+01:00 (CET)
  - Summer (DST): UTC+02:00 (CEST)
- Postal code: 12150
- ^{1} French Land Register data, which excludes lakes, ponds, glaciers > 1 km^{2} (0.386 sq mi or 247 acres) and river estuaries.

Sévérac-le-Château (French: [seveʁak lə ʃɑto]; Languedocien: Severac del Castèl) is a former commune in the Aveyron department in Occitania, southern France. On 1 January 2016, it was merged into the new commune of Sévérac-d'Aveyron.

The Château de Sévérac is a 13th-century castle that dominates the town. It is open to the public.

== Geography ==
The territory of the municipality of Sévérac-le-Château is a southern part of the Massif Central. It is located on the plateau caussenard the same name. Its capital city is a stronghold since antiquity. The territory of this county is part of the regional park of Grands Causses.

=== Hydrography ===
In the town of Sévérac-le-Château is many sources the most important are therefore that Merdans, the Verlenque and the Aveyron.

=== The train station ===
In the late nineteenth century, the bifurcation of the railway from Béziers to the north (Neussargues) and west (Rodez) installed a locomotive depot, repair workshops and a new district populated by railway. It was Sévérac-Gare. Not far from the station were deposits which contained steam locomotives until 1953. By the early 1990s, the buildings were razed; only one building still remains. This modern city has expanded to "reach" the upper town named Sévérac-le-Château. The line was electrified in Neussargues Béziers in 2 stages, by the South Company in 1500 VDC:

Locomotive deposits sheltered until 1986 BB locomotive "MIDI", 1500 VDC, built between 1925 and 1936.

=== Roads ===
The construction of the A75 Clermont-Ferrand - Béziers in 1998, reinforced by the implementation of the service Millau viaduct in 2004, and making 2 × 2 lanes of the N88 Toulouse - Lyon confirmed the important location of this intersection. Sévérac-le-Château is located 84.76 kilometers from Albi, 153.25 km of Toulouse, 103.17 km of Montpellier, 163.24 km of Clermont-Ferrand, 212.41 km of Lyon, 509.5 km of Paris, 293.72 km of Bordeaux and 218.91 km of Marseille.

=== Urbanism ===
Sévérac-Château is surrounded by many hamlets (Novis, Blayac, Funds, Le Villaret, Altès, Saint Dalmazy, Villeplaine) to houses covered with stone tiles (in stone plateau). The plateau on which lies the town bears the name of Causse de Sévérac.

== Toponymy ==
The name comes from Severus, probably a large Gallo-Roman owner of the 6th century. During the Revolution, the town was named Sévérac-la-Montagne.

== History ==
=== Prehistory ===
The mound of Sévérac, which rises to 817 meters, has been occupied since prehistoric times. Evidenced by the dolmens found on the dolmen route to the village of Buzeins.

=== Antiquity ===
The occupancy is attested from the eleventh century. Visigoths and Franks occupied the site in 732, and then it fell to the Saracens. Later, Charlemagne made of Sévérac the seat of a viguerie.

=== Middle Ages ===
Sévérac was stormed by Simon de Montfort in 1214 and later (in 1444) by Louis XI.

=== Modern era ===
It became the capital of Severac district from 1790 to 1800. Between 1795 and 1800, it absorbs Altès, then between 1820 and 1832, Novis and St. Dalmazy.

== Politics ==
- 1940 Mr. Lacombe Removed by the Marion prefect.
- 1940s doctor Molinié
- 1940s M. Montetty Mayor appointed ex officio by the Vichy government.
- 1947 1959 Dr. Yves Testor Socialist Party General Counsel
- 1965 1985 Dr. Yves Testor Socialist Party General Counsel
- 1985 1994 Raymond Viala SE
- 1994 2008 Bernard Sellier MPF - DVD Senator RDSE
- 2008 2021 Camille Galibert DVD and UDI Community Advisor.

== Population ==
Historical population

Year	Pop.	±% p.a.
1793	1,326	—
1800	2,113	+6.88%
1806	2,575	+3.35%
1821	2,725	+0.38%
1831	2,979	+0.90%
1836	3,012	+0.22%
1841	2,882	−0.88%
1851	3,035	+0.52%
1856	2,906	−0.86%
1861	2,772	−0.94%
1866	2,786	+0.10%
1872	2,792	+0.04%
1875	2,965	+2.02%
1881	3,425	+2.43%
1886	3,347	−0.46%
1891	3,168	−1.09%
1896	3,253	+0.53%

Year	Pop.	±% p.a.
1901	3,134	−0.74%
1906	3,250	+0.73%
1911	3,498	+1.48%
1921	3,311	−0.55%
1926	3,539	+1.34%
1931	3,693	+0.86%
1936	3,607	−0.47%
1946	3,539	−0.19%
1954	3,094	−1.67%
1962	3,093	−0.00%
1968	3,031	−0.34%
1975	2,931	−0.48%
1982	2,774	−0.78%
1990	2,486	−1.36%
1999	2,458	−0.13%
2021	2,418	−0.07%

Source: EHESS and INSEE

== Education ==
The city has two kindergartens, two primary schools and two colleges. Public kindergarten Jules Ferry: Placed in the street Serge Duhourquet, the Jules Ferry school was built in the late nineteenth century. In 2008 by increasing the number of children and lack of space, it moved to new premises funded by the municipality. A new expansion project is expected by 2014. The public primary school: Historically built in the mid-nineteenth century to house the town hall, the school occupied the premises in 1904 and the town hall moved to an annex building. Located in the street of Moat, the building's architecture is an artistic feat of the era with its parabolic arches beams that support the structure. In 1918 as in 1945, a memorial was built and the names of the dead for France were engraved there. This monument is located in front of the school.

The public college: Built in 1972 by the General Council of Aveyron, the college was built near surrounding sports facilities. It is situated Avenue du General de Gaulle. In 1990 a building was constructed nearby to host a workshop of technological machines for students. In 2004, it is the third most equipped College of Aveyron. In 2011 the college was the work funded by the General Council to set standards (creation of a lift, wall insulation) and technology workshop was turned into a gym.

== Heritage ==
=== The Severac castle ===
Sévérac Château is a castle in Sévérac-le-Château, France. The castle, now in ruins, is located in the municipality of Sévérac-le-Château, in the French department of Aveyron. The building is classified as historical monuments 1922.

The castle belonged to several families: Sévérac (whose last direct descendant was Amaury de Sévérac, Marshal of France and condottiere in Italy, strangled in Gages on the order of Armagnac), the Armagnac and the Arpajon (the last family member to reside at the castle was Louis Arpajon, Marquis of Sévérac and Duke of Arpajon). It is the latter that made transform the fortress castle palace-style Renaissance - by an Italian architect, who also designed the set in Renaissance style the royal palace in Prague - which you can still see the southern facade. The tour allows you to discover walls, curtain walls, watchtowers, chapel and kitchen.

Visible from all points of the horizon, the castle of the 13th and 17th centuries dominates the plain where the Aveyron takes its source. Below the castle, the medieval city offers a panorama of the region. The streets around the castle are lined with old shops of the 15th century and 16th century, houses are cantilevered, with porches and stairs.

=== The medieval town ===
The medieval city, built on the slope southeast of the mound (for better illumination of the sun), was once protected by a rampart and four fortified gates, two still exist, the Peyrou and that of Latazou.

Built on a plane arc of a circle, the three main streets (Amaury de Sévérac, Duke of Arpajon, and Belvezet) radiate around the Place de la Fontaine. They open on other streets and carayrolles, lanes sometimes appointed stairs due to the terrain, under houses, covered passageways, vaulted or not.

Divided into 6 districts, artisans and merchants thrived in these walls and, in particular, the weavers who made cadis, quite thick woolen and uncombed for making, among other things, military clothing. Sheets and paintings were also manufactured and sold in the city, with convoys of saddles animals in the south of France and to Genoa in Italy.

It is home to beautiful residences with staircase tower, timbered and cantilevers. Among the notable buildings: the Maison des Consuls, House of Joan, the Sestayral (grain market), the Romanesque fountain, and Holy Saviour Church.

=== House of Joan ===
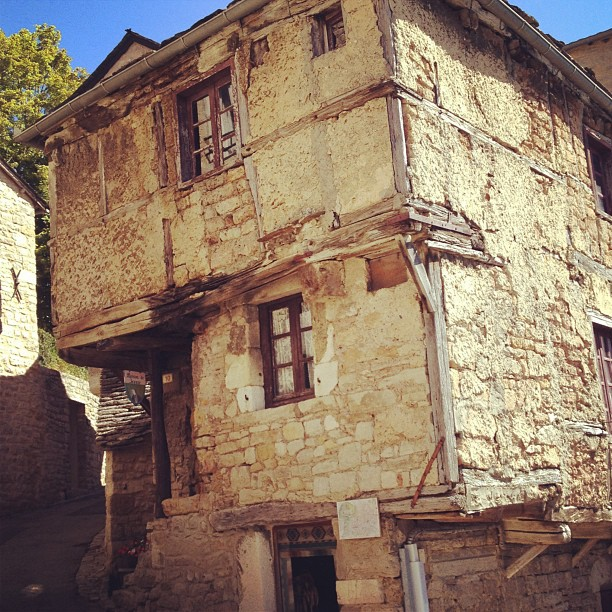
The Maison de Jeanne

The House of Joan or Maison de Jeanne (la maison de Jeanne) is a three-story house that dates to the 15th century.

=== Château Loupiac ===
Loupiac Castle is a castle in Lapanouse in France. The castle is located in the municipality of Lapanouse in the French department of Aveyron. The building is registered as historical monuments 1928.

=== Château d'Auberoques ===
Auberoques Castle is a castle in Sévérac-le-Château, France. The castle is located in the municipality of Sévérac-le-Château, in the French department of Aveyron. (Midi Pyrenees) The building is registered as historical monuments 1991.

=== Engayresque Château ===
Engayresque Castle is a castle located in the municipality of Sévérac-le-Château near the village of Novis in the Aveyron department. The castle is located in the municipality of Sévérac-le-Château near the village of Novis in the Aveyron department. It is hidden in a depression, was out of sight. The main building, consisting of a beautiful facade with her two towers, is exposed to the east, facing the forest. At the rear, the adjacent farm to the main building, has formed a small courtyard facing south. The first illustrates lord who lived the bat was John Hugeneau the fifteenth century. The castle was later bought by the Talon family, industrial Saint-Geniez Olt. In 1870, the entire mansion was raised. The building was listed as a historic monument in 1991. Thus, this beautiful land has remained in the family. Recently, a team shooting a horror film about the castle called "The House of the bad dream" because it is rather frightening and hides many mysteries.

=== Moulin de La Calsalde ===
Located in the district of Calquières the building was built between the eleventh and the twelfth century by the monks of Puech Agudet (now occupied Notre Dame de Lorette). Between 1790 and 1792, the mill was modernized: digging ponds - tanks, building the dike of the pond, construction of a canal to bring water from the Aveyron and waterfall for the overflow. It is the oldest industrial mill of Aveyron.

=== Château Loupiac ===
The family of Lapanouse built this castle in the 13th century but the lords of Sévérac constantly challenged this property. Large house, flanked by four round towers with very thick walls, he had a very important role in the religious wars where it was taken and retaken by the two camps. He was caught and burned during the Revolution. It is now owned by the family of Gransaigne Hauterive since 1693.

=== St. Dalmazy church ===
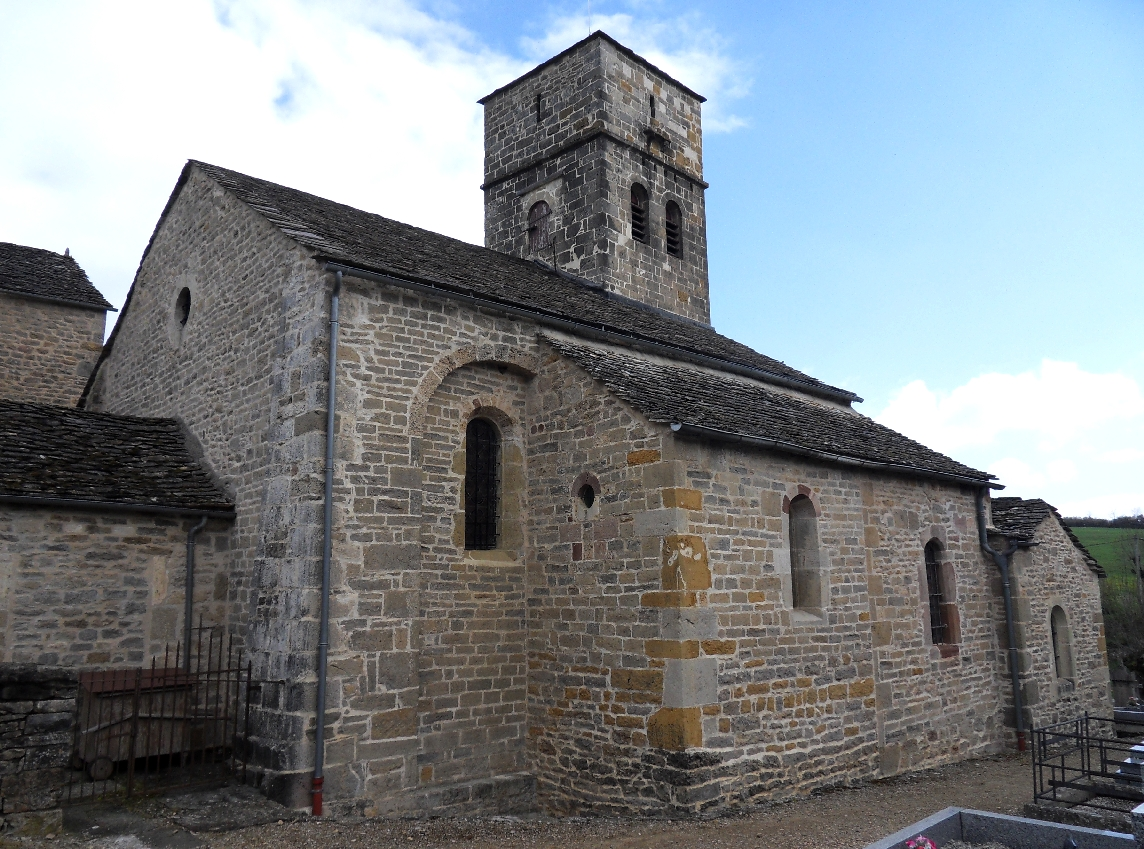
Sévérac église Saint-Dalmazy.

The first church of Saint Dalmazy was built in the 9th century by the monks of fortified monastery of La Canourgue a dependent on the abbey of St. Victor of Marseille. In the early 12th century, the Benedictines of Saint Théofred community received the monastery of Saint Sauveur (in Sévérac), the priories of Sévérac and the churches of St. Dalmazy and Gaillac d'Aveyron. The building of the main body is built on a basilica plan whose main element is a rectangular room divided into three parts (two aisles and nave). In the seventeenth century, the abbey church, enlarged, also became parish.

The church was listed in the monuments historiques in 1930.

=== Chapelle Notre-Dame de Lorette ===
In 1651, the Duke Louis d'Arpajon, lord of the castle Sévérac built, opposite the hill of Sévérac, an atonement chapel of the death of his wife Gloriande Thémines and to redeem the crimes of his mother Jacquette Clermont (a Protestante who, allegedly, who have ordered the death of several Catholic priests through having them cast down a cliff). He performs before a pilgrimage to Rome and the Holy House of Loreto in Italy. This is the birthplace of Mary in Nazareth. This building was transported by boat crossed by several of Palestine in Italy. The Chapel of Our Lady of Loreto Sévérac is the exact replica of the Holy House of Loreto in Italy. Faced with the influx of pilgrims, the Duke of Arpajon had built, from 1658 the St. Joseph chapel next to Our Lady of Loreto and St. Louis chapel beneath which another chapel was dedicated to the Holy Sepulchre. Finally, housing for 12 church was completed in 1666. The community lived 130 years. Lorette The chapel of Our Lady contains the heart of the Duke, his mother and of his second wife, Marie de Simiane.

In the Revolution, the buildings were looted, desecrated and sold as national property. During the looting, a statue of the Virgin Mary was desecrated. A shepherdess, Marie Verlac, the hamlet of Cayrac hidden in the thicket had lost nothing of the scene and hurried to move the statue into a hedge, picking her up at night and hide in a hamlet barn the Calsade below. Thus every night at family prayer, the shepherdess was not wanting to add a "Pater per ocquelo qu'es ol Palio" ("Our Father for that which is hidden in the barn" in Occitan) without anyone understood the meaning of his words. When worship was restored, Mary revealed the presence of the statue which was carried in the parish church Saint-Sauveur, where it remains today. The sanctuary of the hill was only restored in 1854 when the pilgrimages grew again.

=== Parish of Saint-Chely ===
Located 2 km south of Sévérac, the church of Saint-Chely was a long time the only parish in Séveragais. It was only in 1150 that the inhabitants of the town of Sévérac recovered the church of the Benedictine monastery in the medieval city. Again without parish between 1407 and 1787, the inhabitants of the town depends on the parish of Saint Chely. After the Concordat (1801), half of the faithful will be referred to other churches closer to their homes. In 1965, Saint Chely is attached to the parish of Saint Sauveur Sévérac.

=== Lake of the Cisba ===
It was in 1943 that the industrial group known today as the Pechiney created the Industrial Company Bituminous Shale Aveyronnais whose main site was located in the municipality of Lapanouse. The schists were exploited by open pit over a front of more than 10 m high. They were then crushed and taken to the ovens. Hot gases passing through the raw material, the vapor collected at the outlet was condensed and ran after a close heavy oil fuel. The yield was 42 kg of oil per ton of shale and he treated 1,000 tonnes per day. The plant employed 500 people. In 1946, he studies the possibility of transforming the cement residue. In 1950, the plant production was 6277 tonnes, 300 tankers. The operation of the plant terminated by 31 January 1951, the state ending the contract between him and the company. The total liquidation occurs in 1964. The large concrete storage buildings will be destroyed in August 1978 by a military company of engineers.

This time, it remains the artificial lake, currently property of Sévérac Community of Communes, and the 2 dumps only witnesses of industrial activity. In 1996, the firm responsible for ANTEA hydrobiological study of the lake presented its report: bacteriological examination of water is very satisfactory (no coliform, no streptococci). Swimming is possible. The lake is spring fed from water seepage in the shale layers and flowing along the limestone strata. The greatest depth is 5.80 m. Since 1998, under the leadership of the community of communes and cantonal tourist office, this site has been valued by external developments: creation of a sanitary room, a car park and surrounding areas, public lighting and connection networks.

== People ==
- Gui V Sévérac (1250–1273), French noble
- Jordan Catala (fl.1280 - ca.1330), a Dominican missionary and explorer in Asia.
- Amaury de Sévérac, Marshal of France in 1424.
- Duke Louis of Arpajon, 17th-century marshal of France.
- Family of La Valette-Parisot, a branch was set at Sévérac.
- Yves Testor, mayor and head of the maquis of Sévérac, Arete-willow,
- Bernard Sellier, politician
- Pau Gayraud (1898–1994), writer.
- Armand Vaquerin (1951–1993), player rugby.

== See also ==
- Communes of the Aveyron department
