= Vauchamps, Doubs =

Vauchamps
- Part of Bouclans
- Coat of arms
- Location of Vauchamps
- Location within France Location within Bourgogne-Franche-Comté
- Coordinates: 47°16′24″N 6°14′28″E
- Country: France
- Region: Bourgogne-Franche-Comté
- Department: Doubs
- Arrondissement: Besançon
- Canton: Baume-les-Dames
- Commune: Bouclans
- Area^{1}: 2.94 km^{2} (1.14 sq mi)
- Highest elevation: 457 m (1,499 ft)
- Lowest elevation: 395 m (1,296 ft)
- Population (2019): 120
  - Density: 41/km^{2} (110/sq mi)
- Time zone: UTC+01:00 (CET)
  - Summer (DST): UTC+02:00 (CEST)
- Postal code: 25360
- ^{1} French Land Register data, which excludes lakes, ponds, glaciers > 1 km^{2} (0.386 sq mi or 247 acres) and river estuaries.

Vauchamps (French pronunciation: [voʃɑ̃]) is a former commune in the Doubs department in the Bourgogne-Franche-Comté region in eastern France. On 1 January 2018, it was merged into the commune of Bouclans.

== Geography ==
Vauchamps lies 9 km (5.6 mi) south of Roulans on a wooded plain. The commune occupies a wooded plain with several small lakes and the Gour, over which there is a bridge in the middle of the village.

== See also ==
- Communes of the Doubs department
