= Sévérac-l'Église =

Commune in Aveyron, France

- Part of Laissac-Sévérac-l'Église
- Location of Sévérac-l'Église
- Location within France Location within Occitanie
- Coordinates: 44°21′47″N 2°50′57″E
- Country: France
- Region: Occitania
- Department: Aveyron
- Arrondissement: Rodez
- Canton: Lot et Palanges
- Commune: Laissac-Sévérac-l'Église
- Area^{1}: 13.69 km^{2} (5.29 sq mi)
- Elevation: 635 m (2,083 ft)
- Highest elevation: 950 m (3,120 ft)
- Lowest elevation: 609 m (1,998 ft)
- Population (2019): 419
  - Density: 30.6/km^{2} (79.3/sq mi)
- Time zone: UTC+01:00 (CET)
  - Summer (DST): UTC+02:00 (CEST)
- Postal code: 12310
- ^{1} French Land Register data, which excludes lakes, ponds, glaciers > 1 km^{2} (0.386 sq mi or 247 acres) and river estuaries.

Sévérac-l'Église (French pronunciation: [seveʁak leɡliz]; Languedocien: Severac de la Glèisa) is a former commune in the Aveyron department in southern France. On 1 January 2016, it was merged into the new commune of Laissac-Sévérac-l'Église.

== Population ==
Historical population
| Year | Pop. | ±% p.a. |
|---|---|---|
| 1962 | 370 | — |
| 1968 | 428 | +2.46% |
| 1975 | 422 | −0.20% |
| 1982 | 366 | −2.01% |
| 1990 | 415 | +1.58% |
| 1999 | 418 | +0.08% |
| 2006 | 424 | +0.20% |
| 2019 | 419 | −0.09% |
Source: EHESS and INSEE

== See also ==
- Communes of the Aveyron department
