= Recoules-Prévinquières =

Part of Sévérac-d'Aveyron in Occitanie, France

- Part of Sévérac-d'Aveyron
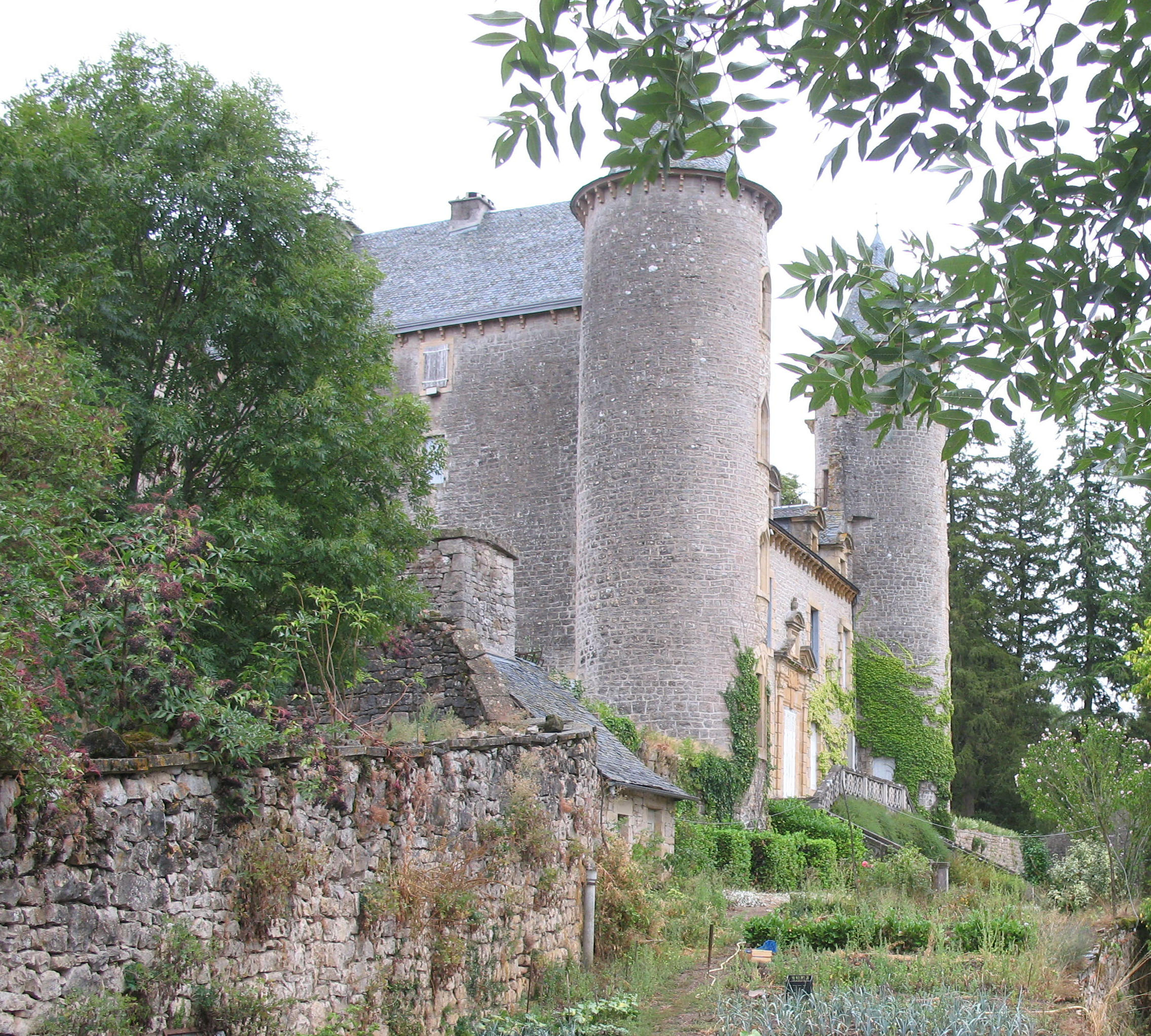
- The Château of Recoules

- Coat of arms
- Location of Recoules-Prévinquières
- Location within France Location within Occitanie
- Coordinates: 44°20′30″N 2°58′11″E
- Country: France
- Region: Occitania
- Department: Aveyron
- Arrondissement: Millau
- Canton: Tarn et Causses
- Commune: Sévérac-d'Aveyron
- Area^{1}: 25.2 km^{2} (9.7 sq mi)
- Elevation: 630 m (2,070 ft)
- Highest elevation: 1,040 m (3,410 ft)
- Lowest elevation: 609 m (1,998 ft)
- Population (2023): 460
  - Density: 18/km^{2} (47/sq mi)
- Time zone: UTC+01:00 (CET)
  - Summer (DST): UTC+02:00 (CEST)
- Postal code: 12150
- ^{1} French Land Register data, which excludes lakes, ponds, glaciers > 1 km^{2} (0.386 sq mi or 247 acres) and river estuaries.

Recoules-Prévinquières (French pronunciation: [ʁəkul pʁevɛ̃kjɛʁ]; Languedocien: Recolas e Previnquièiras) is a former commune in the Aveyron department in southern France. On 1 January 2016, it was merged into the new commune of Sévérac-d'Aveyron.

== See also ==
- Communes of the Aveyron department
