= Laissac-Sévérac-l'Église =

Commune in Occitanie, France

- Commune
- Coat of arms
- Location of Laissac-Sévérac-l'Église
- Location within France Location within Occitanie
- Coordinates: 44°22′52″N 2°49′19″E
- Country: France
- Region: Occitania
- Department: Aveyron
- Arrondissement: Rodez
- Canton: Lot et Palanges

Government
  - Mayor (2020–2026): David Minerva
- Area^{1}: 33.90 km^{2} (13.09 sq mi)
- Population (2023): 2,141
  - Density: 63.16/km^{2} (163.6/sq mi)
- Time zone: UTC+01:00 (CET)
  - Summer (DST): UTC+02:00 (CEST)
- INSEE/Postal code: 12120 /12310
- ^{1} French Land Register data, which excludes lakes, ponds, glaciers > 1 km^{2} (0.386 sq mi or 247 acres) and river estuaries.

Laissac-Sévérac-l'Église (French pronunciation: [lɛsak seveʁak leɡliz]; Occitan: Laissac e Severac) is a commune in the department of Aveyron, southern France. The municipality was established on 1 January 2016 by the merger of the former communes of Laissac and Sévérac-l'Église.

Laissac is listed as a Village étape.

== Population ==
Population data refer to the commune in its geography as of January 2025.

Historical population
Year	Pop.	±% p.a.
1968	1,703	—
1975	1,786	+0.68%
1982	1,842	+0.44%
1990	1,810	−0.22%
1999	1,885	+0.45%
2007	1,940	+0.36%
2012	2,058	+1.19%
2017	2,120	+0.60%
2023	2,141	+0.16%
Source: INSEE

== See also ==
- Communes of the Aveyron department
