= Baye, Marne =

Baye
- Commune
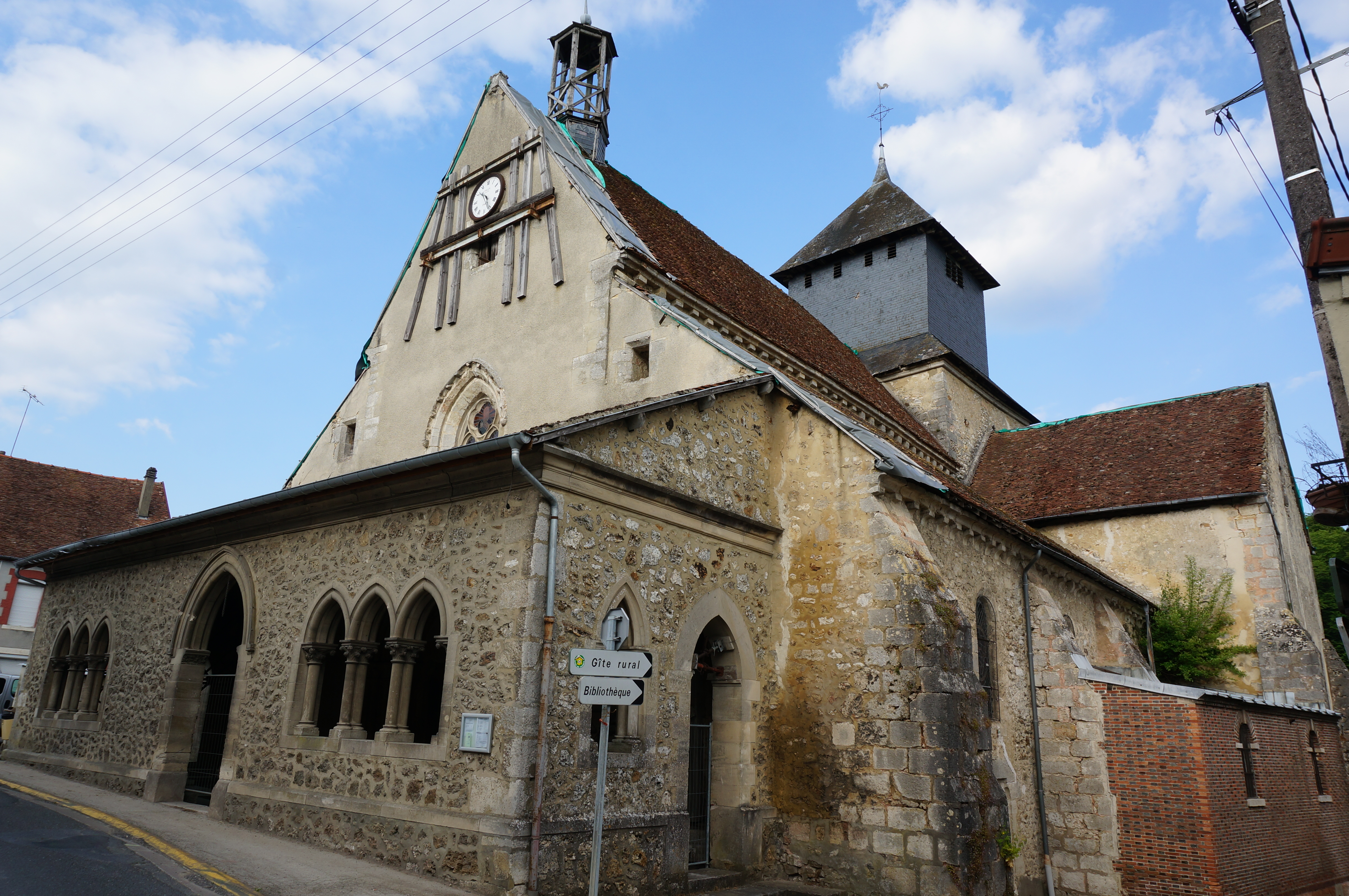
- The church in Baye
- Location of Baye
- Location within France Location within Grand Est
- Coordinates: 48°51′20″N 3°45′54″E
- Country: France
- Region: Grand Est
- Department: Marne
- Arrondissement: Épernay
- Canton: Dormans-Paysages de Champagne

Government
  - Mayor (2020–2026): Denis Moreaux
- Area^{1}: 17.98 km^{2} (6.94 sq mi)
- Elevation: 188 m (617 ft)
- Population (2023): 372
  - Density: 20.7/km^{2} (53.6/sq mi)
- Time zone: UTC+01:00 (CET)
  - Summer (DST): UTC+02:00 (CEST)
- INSEE/Postal code: 51042 /51270
- ^{1} French Land Register data, which excludes lakes, ponds, glaciers > 1 km^{2} (0.386 sq mi or 247 acres) and river estuaries.

Baye (French pronunciation: [bɛ]) is a commune in the Marne department in northeastern France.

== Population ==
Historical population
Year	Pop.	±% p.a.
1968	528	—
1975	482	−1.29%
1982	483	+0.03%
1990	444	−1.05%
1999	393	−1.35%
2007	377	−0.52%
2012	402	+1.29%
2017	410	+0.39%
2023	372	−1.61%
Source: INSEE

== See also ==
- Communes of the Marne department
