= Sévérac-d'Aveyron =

Commune in Occitanie, France

- Commune
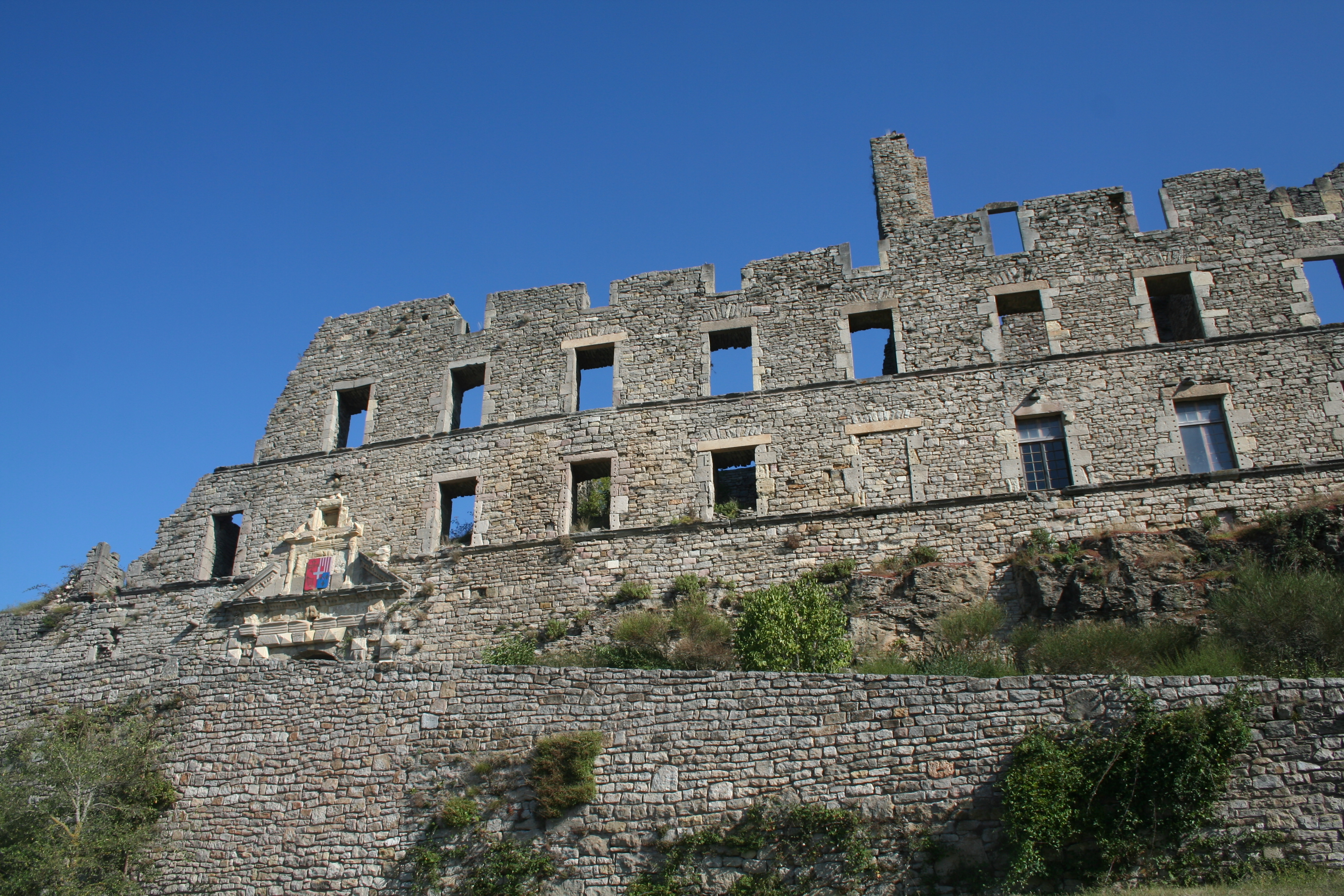
- The chateau of Sévérac
- Location of Sévérac-d'Aveyron
- Location within France Location within Occitanie
- Coordinates: 44°19′19″N 3°04′16″E
- Country: France
- Region: Occitania
- Department: Aveyron
- Arrondissement: Rodez
- Canton: Tarn et Causses
- Area^{1}: 208.72 km^{2} (80.59 sq mi)
- Population (2023): 4,026
  - Density: 19.29/km^{2} (49.96/sq mi)
- Time zone: UTC+01:00 (CET)
  - Summer (DST): UTC+02:00 (CEST)
- INSEE/Postal code: 12270 /12150
- ^{1} French Land Register data, which excludes lakes, ponds, glaciers > 1 km^{2} (0.386 sq mi or 247 acres) and river estuaries.

Sévérac-d'Aveyron is a commune in the department of Aveyron, southern France. The municipality was established on 1 January 2016 by merger of the former communes of Sévérac-le-Château, Buzeins, Lapanouse, Lavernhe and Recoules-Prévinquières.

== Population ==
Population data refer to the commune in its geography as of January 2025.

Historical population
Year	Pop.	±% p.a.
1968	4,519	—
1975	4,429	−0.29%
1982	4,259	−0.56%
1990	4,019	−0.72%
1999	4,009	−0.03%
2007	4,033	+0.07%
2012	4,063	+0.15%
2017	4,084	+0.10%
2023	4,026	−0.24%
Source: INSEE

== See also ==
- Communes of the Aveyron department
