= Vauchamps, Marne =

Vauchamps
- Commune
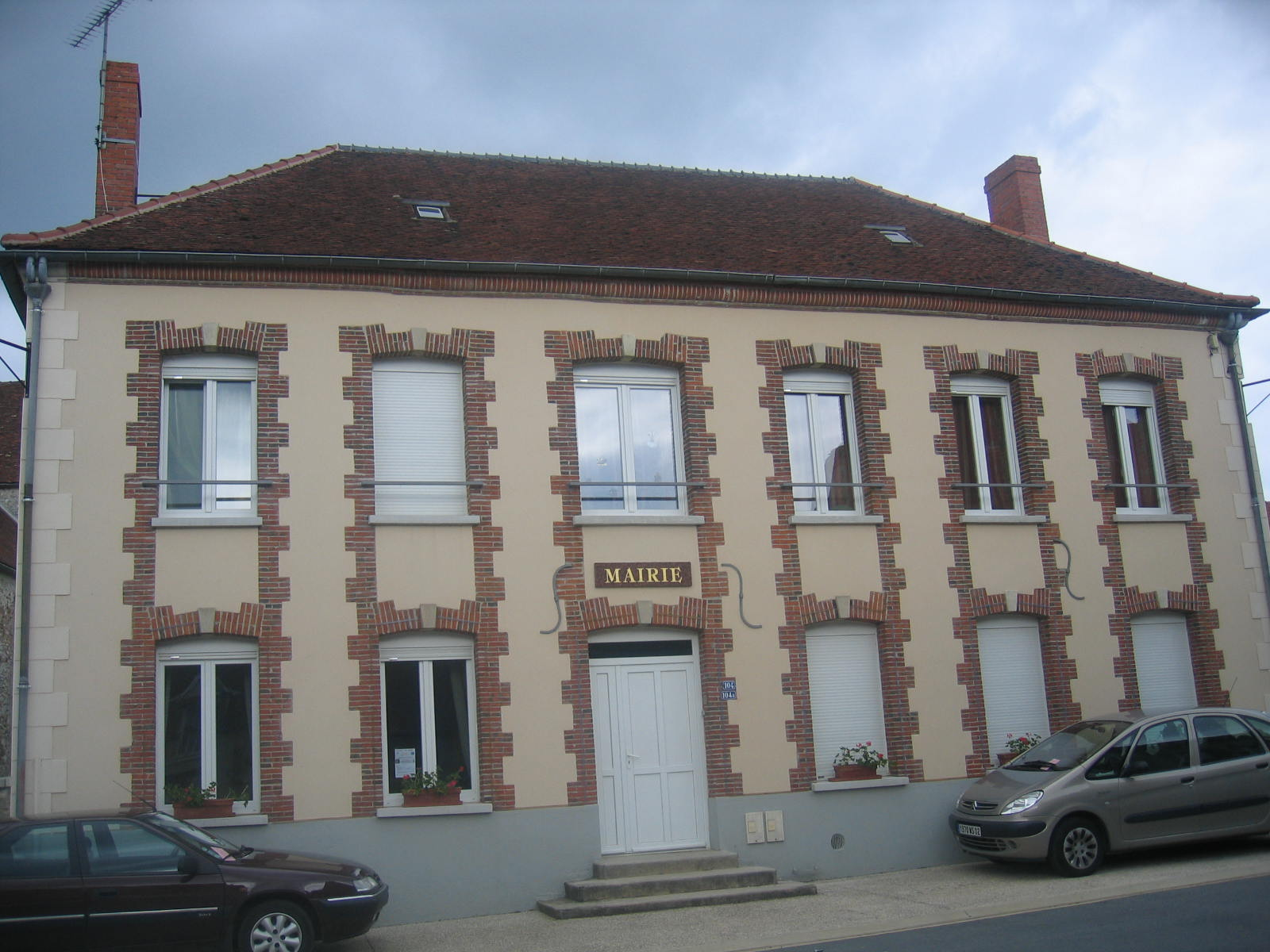
- The town hall in Vauchamps

- Coat of arms
- Location of Vauchamps
- Location within France Location within Grand Est
- Coordinates: 48°52′52″N 3°36′59″E
- Country: France
- Region: Grand Est
- Department: Marne
- Arrondissement: Épernay
- Canton: Sézanne-Brie et Champagne
- Intercommunality: CC Brie Champenoise

Government
  - Mayor (2020–2026): Danielle Berat
- Area^{1}: 12.88 km^{2} (4.97 sq mi)
- Elevation: 218 m (715 ft)
- Population (2023): 338
  - Density: 26.2/km^{2} (68.0/sq mi)
- Time zone: UTC+01:00 (CET)
  - Summer (DST): UTC+02:00 (CEST)
- INSEE/Postal code: 51596 /51210
- ^{1} French Land Register data, which excludes lakes, ponds, glaciers > 1 km^{2} (0.386 sq mi or 247 acres) and river estuaries.

Vauchamps (French pronunciation: [voʃɑ̃]) is a commune in the Marne department in north-eastern France. The village was the site of the Battle of Vauchamps in which Napoleon's French army defeated Gebhard Leberecht von Blücher's Russo-Prussian army on 14 February 1814.

== See also ==
- Communes of the Marne department
