= Fromentières, Marne =

Fromentières
- Commune
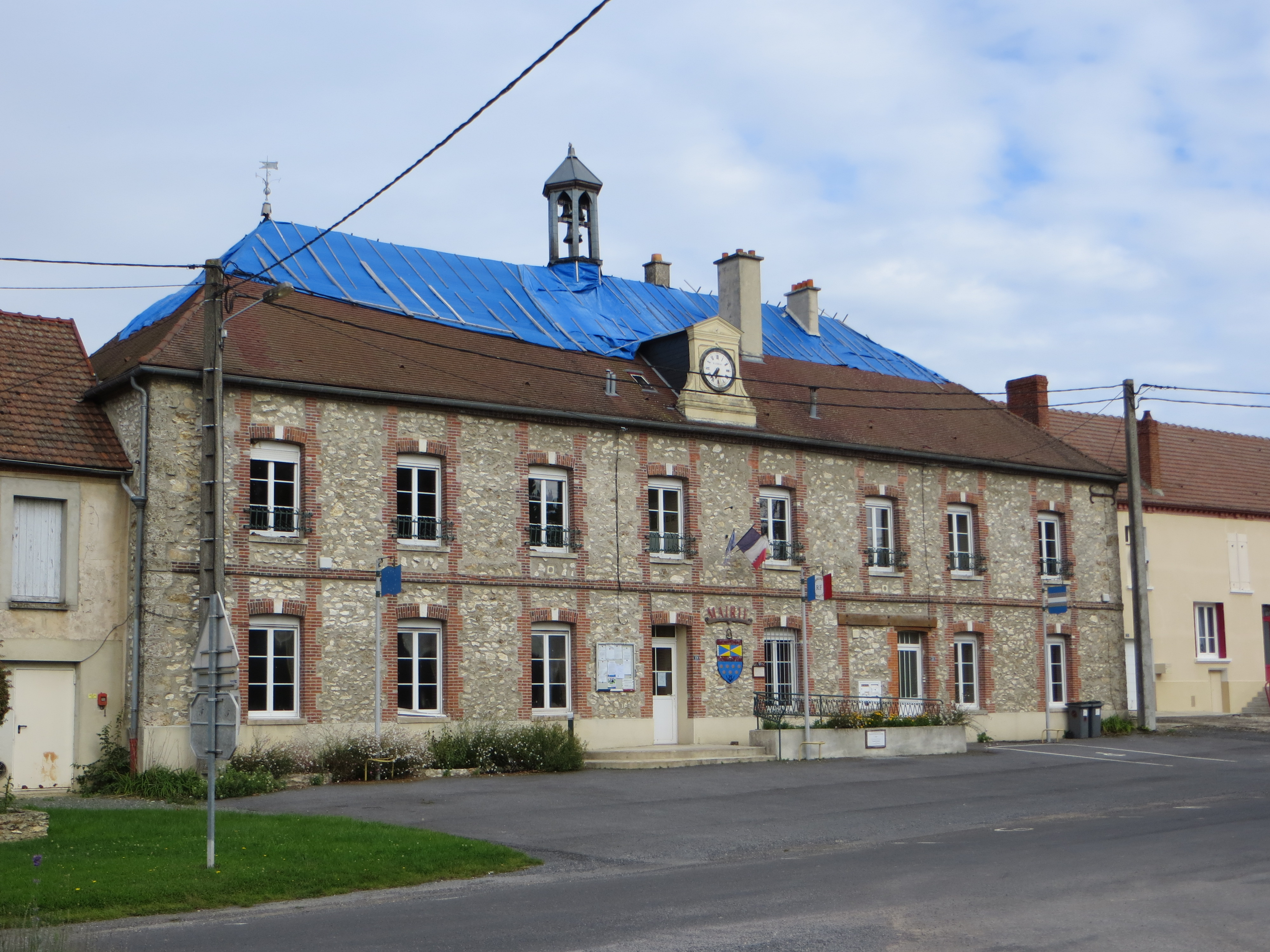
- The town hall in Fromentières
- Location of Fromentières
- Location within France Location within Grand Est
- Coordinates: 48°53′23″N 3°42′22″E
- Country: France
- Region: Grand Est
- Department: Marne
- Arrondissement: Épernay
- Canton: Sézanne-Brie et Champagne
- Intercommunality: CC Brie Champenoise

Government
  - Mayor (2020–2026): René Condette
- Area^{1}: 8.88 km^{2} (3.43 sq mi)
- Elevation: 216 m (709 ft)
- Population (2023): 382
  - Density: 43.0/km^{2} (111/sq mi)
- Time zone: UTC+01:00 (CET)
  - Summer (DST): UTC+02:00 (CEST)
- INSEE/Postal code: 51263 /51210
- ^{1} French Land Register data, which excludes lakes, ponds, glaciers > 1 km^{2} (0.386 sq mi or 247 acres) and river estuaries.

Fromentières (French pronunciation: [fʁɔmɑ̃tjɛʁ]) is a commune in the Marne department in north-eastern France.

== See also ==
- Communes of the Marne department
