= 8th Estonia Infantry Regiment =

Regiment of the Imperial Russian Army

- 1911 commemorative badge
- Active: 1811–1918 (seniority to 1711)
- Country: Russian Empire
- Branch: Imperial Russian Army
- Type: Infantry
- Anniversaries: 6 December (Feast day)
- Engagements: French invasion of Russia; War of the Sixth Coalition; Russo-Turkish War of 1877–1878; World War I

Commanders
- Notable commanders: Lavr Kornilov

The 8th Estonia Infantry Regiment (or 8th Estland Infantry Regiment; Russian: 8-й пехотный Эстляндский полк) was an infantry regiment of the Imperial Russian Army.

== History ==
=== Formation ===
The seniority of the regiment was traced back to the formation of the Reval Regiment of the Reval Garrison in 1711. The garrison also included the Estonia and Dorpat regiments.

The three-battalion Estonia Musketeer Regiment was formed on 17 January 1811 at Reval from six companies of the Reval Garrison Regiment and three companies each from the Pernov and Narva Garrison Battalions. Each battalion included one Grenadier and three Musketeer companies, and the regiment was authorized 2,459 personnel, including 61 officers, 120 non-commissioned officers, and 1,980 privates. Its chef was Major General Gothard Helfreich from formation. On 22 February it was redesignated as the Estonia Infantry Regiment when the Imperial Russian Army replaced the Musketeer designation. A fourth reserve battalion of 559 personnel was added to the regiment on 19 November.

=== French invasion of Russia ===
At the beginning of 1812 it was part of the 2nd Brigade of the 14th Infantry Division, commanded by General Ivan Sazonov. Between 1812 and 1814 the regimental commander was Lieutenant Colonel Karl Ulrichsen, promoted to colonel on 18 October 1812. At the beginning of the French invasion of Russia, the active battalions of the regiment were part of the 14th Division in the 1st Infantry Corps of the 1st Western Army. The reserve battalion was to form the 30th Infantry Division, but instead became part of the Dunamund fortress. With the detachment of General Fyodor von Löwis it fought in the Battle of Ekau and did not join the regiment until July 1813. The grenadier company of the 2nd Battalion became part of the Combined Grenadier Battalion of the division. A reserve battalion was formed at the Staraya Russa recruit depot and was to help form the 39th Infantry Division, but instead joined the Riga fortress garrison.

During the 1812 campaign, the regiment fought in the battles of Boyarshchina, Golovshchina, where it lost 160 men, and Svolne, where it lost 200 men. During the First Battle of Polotsk on 18 August, described as its first major engagement, it lost fourteen officers and more than 400 men but managed to repulse several French attacks and maintain an orderly retreat. Wounded twice during the action, Ulrichsen remained with the regiment and led counterattacks during the retreat. For their actions on that day, 43 men of the regiment were decorated, while the regiment received one white and five colored standards for its actions. The Estonia Regiment then fought at Chashniki and Smoliani. In September it was reinforced by the 8th host (druzhina) of the Saint Petersburg militia.

=== War of the Sixth Coalition ===
In the 1813 campaign it fought in the Siege of Danzig, the Siege of Küstrin, the Siege of Spandau, the Battle of Lützen, and the Battle of Bautzen. As part of the 1st Infantry Corps of General Peter Wittgenstein in the Army of Bohemia it fought in the Battle of Dresden after the resumption of hostilities with Napoleon. During the Battle of Kulm, the regiment participated in the loss and recapture of Cotta, but lost six officers and 260 men – a third of its strength – while fighting on the Kohlberg and at the Gießhübl defile. The regiment fought in the Battle of Leipzig, during which Napoleon was decisively defeated, and was granted the right to march to the drumbeat reserved for grenadier regiments for its courage on 4 March 1814. In the 1814 campaign it blockaded Kehl, then advanced into northwest France. As part of the advance guard of General Peter von Pahlen, the regiment was caught by overwhelmingly numerically superior French forces under Napoleon himself on 17 February at the Battle of Mormant, and was surrounded and almost completely destroyed with a loss of 338 men, leaving only three officers and 69 men in the ranks by the end of the day. The remnants of the regiment, now less than a company, participated in the Battle of Paris.

=== 1815 to 1918 ===
The reserve battalion of the regiment was disbanded on 8 August 1814, and regimental strength increased to 3,558. The position of chef was removed on 10 July 1815 as it proved unnecessary due to the wartime promotion chefs to higher commands. The strength of the 2nd Battalion was reduced by 600 privates on 25 August 1817. The 2nd and 3rd Battalions switched designations on 26 March 1824. The 1st and 2nd Battalions were designated active battalions on 9 May 1830, and the 3rd Battalion became the reserve battalion. The active battalions numbered 2,272 personnel, while the reserve battalion would expand to 1,116 personnel in event of war from a peacetime strength of 488.

On 28 January 1833, as part of a reorganization of the army, the 4th Jaeger Regiment was merged with the regiment, redesignated the Estonia Jaeger Regiment. The reorganized regiment included four active battalions and two reserve battalions. During peacetime, the reserve battalions were consolidated into a single unit. The regiment now had a strength of 5,351 in peacetime and 6,588 in wartime. The 6th reserve battalion was abolished on 28 February 1834, leaving the 5th reserve battalion with a peacetime strength of 472 to be expanded to 1,088 in wartime.

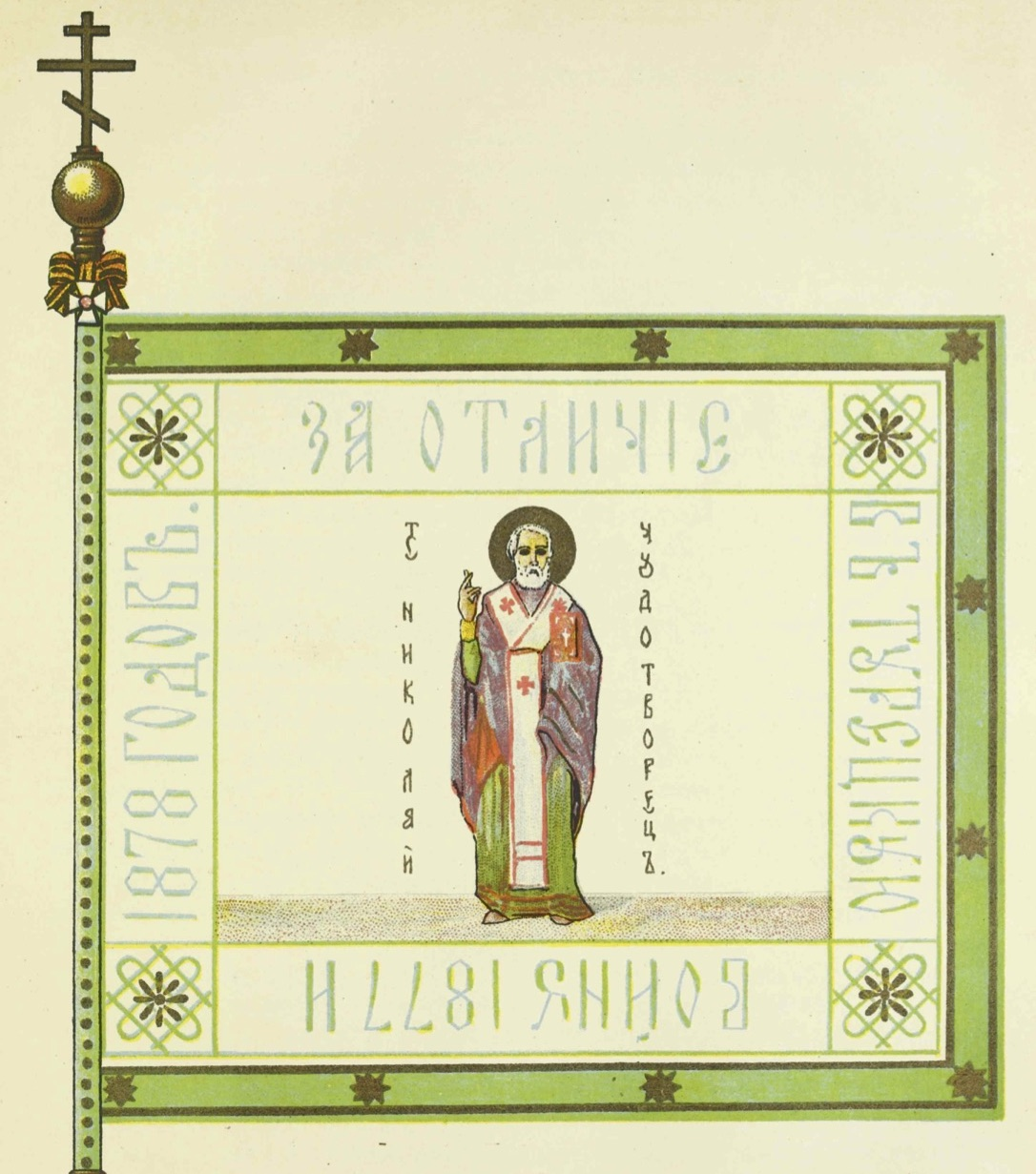
The St. George Standard of the regiment awarded for its actions in the Russo-Turkish War

The regiment was redesignated as the Estonia Infantry Regiment on 17 April 1856 and was numbered as the 8th Estonia Infantry Regiment on 25 March 1864. On 6 January 1885, it received a St. George standard with inscriptions "for courage in the Turkish War of 1877 and 1878" and "1711–1811", along with an Alexander jubilee ribbon. By 1914, the regiment was garrisoned at General Field Marshal Gurko barracks near Jabłonna, part of the 2nd Brigade of the 2nd Infantry Division of the 23rd Army Corps in the Warsaw Military District. It was disbanded in early 1918.

== Citations and references ==
=== Bibliography ===
- Хроника Российской Императорской армии [Chronicle of the Russian Imperial Army] (in Russian). Vol. IV. Saint Petersburg: Voyennaya Tipografiya. 1852.
- Lieven, Dominic (2010). Russia Against Napoleon: The True Story of the Campaigns of War and Peace. New York: Viking. ISBN 978-0-670-02157-4.
- Podmazo, Alexander (2004). "Эстляндский пехотный полк" [Estonia Infantry Regiment]. Отечественная война 1812. Энциклопедия [Patriotic War of 1812: Encyclopedia] (in Russian). Moscow: ROSSPEN. p. 820.
- Shenk, Vladimir (1909). Гренадерские и пехотные полки [Grenadier and Infantry Regiments] (in Russian). Saint Petersburg: V.D. Smirnov.
