= 7th Revel Infantry Regiment =

Reval Musketeer Regiment (340th Regiment) 7th Reval Infantry Regiment 7th Reval Infantry Regiment of General Tuchkov, 4th Regiment
- Ревельский 7-й пехотный полк
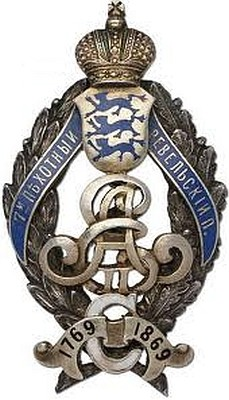
- Breast badge of the 7th Reval Infantry Regiment
- Active: 1775-1918
- Country: Russian Empire; Russian Republic (from 1917)
- Branch: Imperial Russian Army; Russian Army (from 1917)
- Type: Infantry
- Part of: 2nd Infantry Division, 23rd Army Corps, Warsaw Military District
- Garrison/HQ: Pułtusk
- Patron: Alexander Alekseevich Tuchkov
- Anniversaries: August 16
- Engagements: Patriotic War of 1812; War of the Sixth Coalition; November Uprising; Battle of Warsaw; Russo-Turkish War; Battle of Lovcha; Siege of Plevna; World War I; Battle of Tannenberg; Brusilov Offensive; Romanian Campaign

The 7th Reval Infantry Regiment of General Tuchkov, 4th Regiment, also known as the 7th Reval Infantry Regiment, was an infantry regiment of the Imperial Russian Army. After 1820 it was part of the 2nd Infantry Division of the 23rd Army Corps.

== Organization and campaigns ==
The regiment was first formed on March 6, 1775 as the Reval Infantry Regiment and consisted of two infantry battalions, and a Jäger detachment team from the Grenadier and 1st Musketeer Battalions of the Saint Petersburg Legion. The regiment was reorganized on September 2, 1769. The regiment at the time consisted of three Musketeer battalions, four squadrons of Carabiniers, two squadrons of Hussars and three detachments of Jägers, Cossacks, and artillery, numbering about 5,000 personnel. By October 31, 1799 the regiment was led by the Baltic German General Karl Knorring. For much of the regiment's history the regiment was garrisoned and headquartered in the Polish city of Pułtusk and was four battalions strong.

The regiment's first engagement was during the French invasion of Russia in 1812 where it fought at the Battle of Borodino under Major General Alexander Alekseevich Tuchkov, who was killed in action. The regiment later fought in the War of the Sixth Coalition, as well as the November Uprising, and the Russo-Turkish War (1877–1878). During the Russo-Turkish War the regiment fought heavily at the Battle of Lovcha and the Siege of Plevna.

The regiment was officially renamed as the 7th Reval Infantry Regiment of General Tuchkov, 4th Regiment on August 26, 1912 in memory of General Tuchkov. According to the official Address Calendar of 1907-1909, the regiment's last major garrison before World War I in 1909 was in the city of Syzran in Samara Oblast. During WWI the regiment was almost completely destroyed during the Battle of Tannenberg in August 1914. Following Tannenberg the regiment was broken up and withdrawn from the frontlines in order to be reorganized to the Dvina Military District. By September 12, 1914, the regiment was part of the 2nd Brigade of the 2nd Division and remained as part of the 23rd Army Corps and the 2nd Army. By May 5, 1915 the regiment was assigned to the 27th Army Corps as part of the 1st Army. The regiment took part in the larger Brusilov offensive or "June Offensive" from June 4 to September 30, 1916. The regiment's final assignment was in December 1916 as part of the 2nd Division of the 8th Army Corps and was attached to the 6th Army on the Romanian Front.

== Namesake ==
The regiment's two namesakes are for the city of Reval, the Baltic German name for the modern-day city of Tallinn, and for Alexander Alekseevich Tuchkov. Tuchkov was the younger brother of Generals Nikolay Tuchkov, Pavel Tuchkov, and Sergey Tuchkov. Tuchkov was a Major General who commanded the regiment from 1806 to 1812 during the Napoleonic Wars and the French invasion of Russia and died at the Battle of Borodino in 1812.

== Regiment Chiefs ==
- 03.12.1796 - 02.03.1799 - Brigadier General Karl Knorring
- 03/02/1799 - 06/19/1806 - Major General Nikolai Mikhailovich Khotuntsev
- 06/19/1806 - 11/26/1806 - Colonel Prince Alexey Vasilievich Urakov
- 12/03/1806 - 08/26/1812 - Colonel Alexander Alekseevich Tuchkov the 4th

== Regiment commanders ==
- 1775 - 11/24/1780 - Colonel (from 01/01/1779 brigadier) Baron Fersen, Ermolai (German) Egorovich
- 01/01/1781 - after 05/15/1784 - Colonel Divov, Alexander Ivanovich
- 1784 - 1786 - Colonel Levashov, Fedor Ivanovich
- 1787 - 11/24/1790 - colonel (from 02/05/1790 brigadier) von Treiden, Ivan Andreevich
- 1791 - 1792 - Colonel Davydov, Vasily Denisovich
- 02/12/1792 - 10/05/1797 - lieutenant colonel (from 11/07/1794 colonel) Zakrevsky, Dmitry Andreevich
- 07/04/1798 - 06/04/1800 - major (from 10/11/1798 lieutenant colonel, from 12/21/1799 colonel) Winter, Ivan Ivanovich
- 06.07.1800 – 23.06.1806 – Colonel Briesemann von Netting, Wilhelm Ivanovich
- 08/12/1807 - 02/29/1808 - major (from 12/12/1807 lieutenant colonel) Richter, Egor Khristoforovich
- 29.02.1808 – 17.01.1811 – Lieutenant Colonel (from 26.11.1809 Colonel) Maslov, Andrei Timofeevich
- 06/24/1811 - 06/01/1815 - lieutenant colonel (from 08/30/1811 colonel) Zhelvinsky, Yakov Sergeevich
- 01.06.1815 – 06.10.1822 – Colonel Kislovsky, Dmitry Andreevich
- 10/17/1822 - 03/29/1825 - Lieutenant Colonel Maydel 1st
- March 29, 1825 – October 21, 1825 – Colonel Akhlyostyshev, Dmitry Dmitrievich
- 21.10.1825 – 03.04.1828 – Lieutenant Colonel Kridner, Pyotr Antonovich
- 04/24/1828 - 05/24/1833 - lieutenant colonel (from 08/23/1831 colonel) Bershov, Grigory Ivanovich
- 05/24/1833 – 03/16/1844 – Colonel Sarabia, Joseph Dievgovich
- 03/16/1844 - 03/24/1853 - Colonel (from 12/06/1851 Major General) Mikhailovsky, Yakov Pavlovich
- March 24, 1853 – July 18, 1853 – Colonel Meister, Rengold Yakovlevich
- July 18, 1853 – November 7, 1853 – Colonel Stark, Alexander Karlovich
- 07.11.1853 – 18.04.1860 – Colonel (from 26.08.1856 Major General) Farafontov, Nikolai Alexandrovich
- April 18, 1860 – January 18, 1865 – Colonel Baron von der Brinken, Egbert Reinholdovich
- 18.01.1865 - 1867 - Colonel Rodkevich, Lev Lvovich
- 1867 - 11/25/1877 - Colonel Pisanko, Alexey Ivanovich
- 29.12.1877 – 04.09.1879 – Colonel Kashnev, Pavel Ivanovich
- September 27, 1879 – May 17, 1882 – Colonel von Rehbinder, Vladimir Gustavovich
- 05.20.1882 – 06.16.1883 – Colonel Obezyaninov, Dmitry Petrovich
- 16.06.1883 - 15.07.1889 - Colonel Lindström, Gustav Gustavovich
- 11.08.1889 - 26.11.1891 - Colonel Smirnov, Viktor Grigorievich
- November 30, 1891 – January 20, 1895 – Colonel Maksimovich, Mikhail Leontievich
- 01/26/1895 - 03/27/1897 - Colonel Tugan-Mirza-Baranovsky, Alexander Davydovich
- April 25, 1897 – February 15, 1900 – Colonel Kashperov, Alexey Petrovich
- 02/24/1900 - 05/26/1908 - Colonel Meklenburtsev, Vasily Nikolaevich
- 06/29/1908 – 09/19/1912 – Colonel Savich-Zablotsky, Genrikh Aleksandrovich
- 09.23.1912 - 08.13.1914 - Colonel Manulevich-Meydano-Uglu, Mikhail Alexandrovich
- 10.22.1914 – 04.19.1915 – Colonel Zhabchinsky, Alexander Alexandrovich
- April 19, 1915 – November 29, 1916 – Colonel Zhelenin, Makariy Aleksandrovich
- 03/04/1917 - 09/21/1917 - Colonel Danilchenko, Pyotr Vasilievich
- 09/21/1917 - Unknown - Colonel Dlussky, Stanislav Konstantinovich

== Honors ==
- Regimental banner of the Imperial Order of St. George with the inscriptions: “For distinction in the Turkish War of 1877 and 1878” and “1769 - 1869”, with the Alexander I of Russia Jubilee Ribbon.
- Campaign for military distinction. Granted on April 13, 1813.
- Headdress Badge with the inscription: “For Warsaw, August 25 and 26, 1831”, granted on December 6, 1831 for the regiment's role in the Battle of Warsaw during the November Uprising.

== Notable members ==
- Vladimir Vladimirovitch von Manstein: Served in the regiment from 1915 to 1917. Following the Treaty of Brest-Litovsk Manstein became involved in the White movement and commanded the 1st Officer General Markov Regiment.
- Arvīds Krīpens: Latvian Legion officer and Waffen-SS Standartenführer during World War II. Krīpens served in the unit during World War I.

== Gallery ==
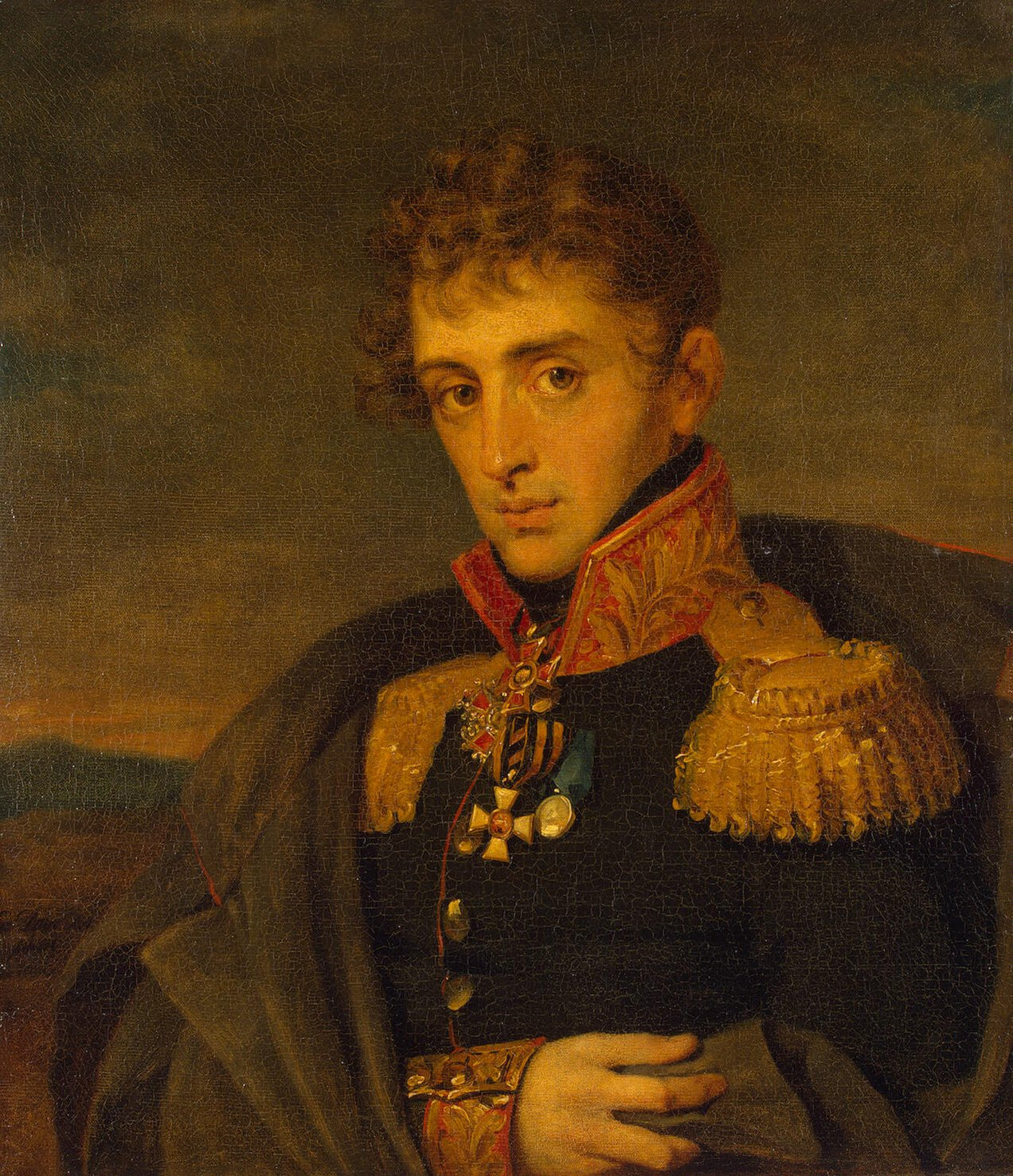
Portrait of Alexander Alekseevich Tuchkov the 4th (1777-1812), commander of the regiment during the Napoleonic Wars who was killed at the Battle of Borodino

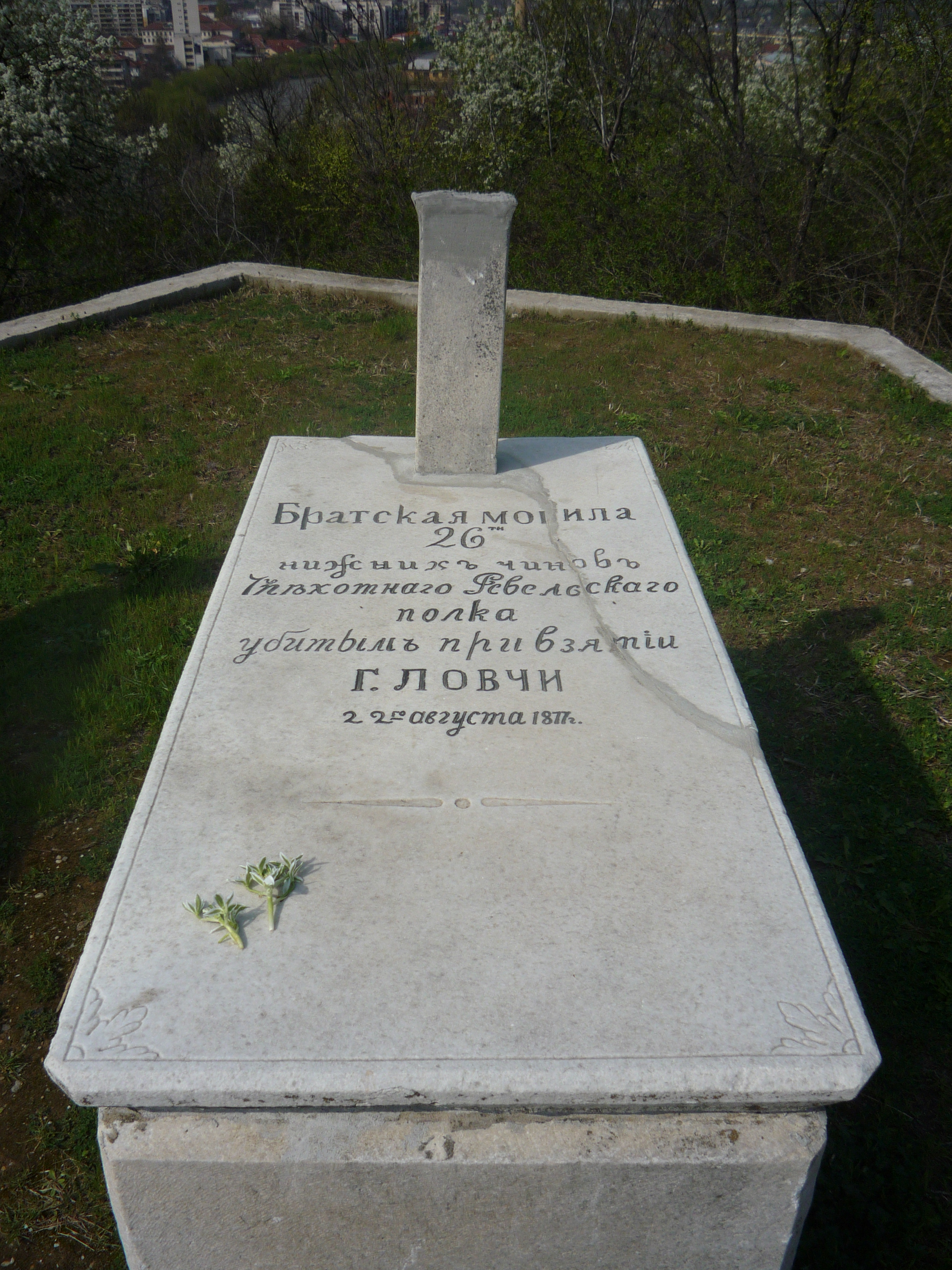
Mass grave of 26 Russian soldiers from the 7th Reval Infantry Regiment who were killed during the Battle of Lovcha.

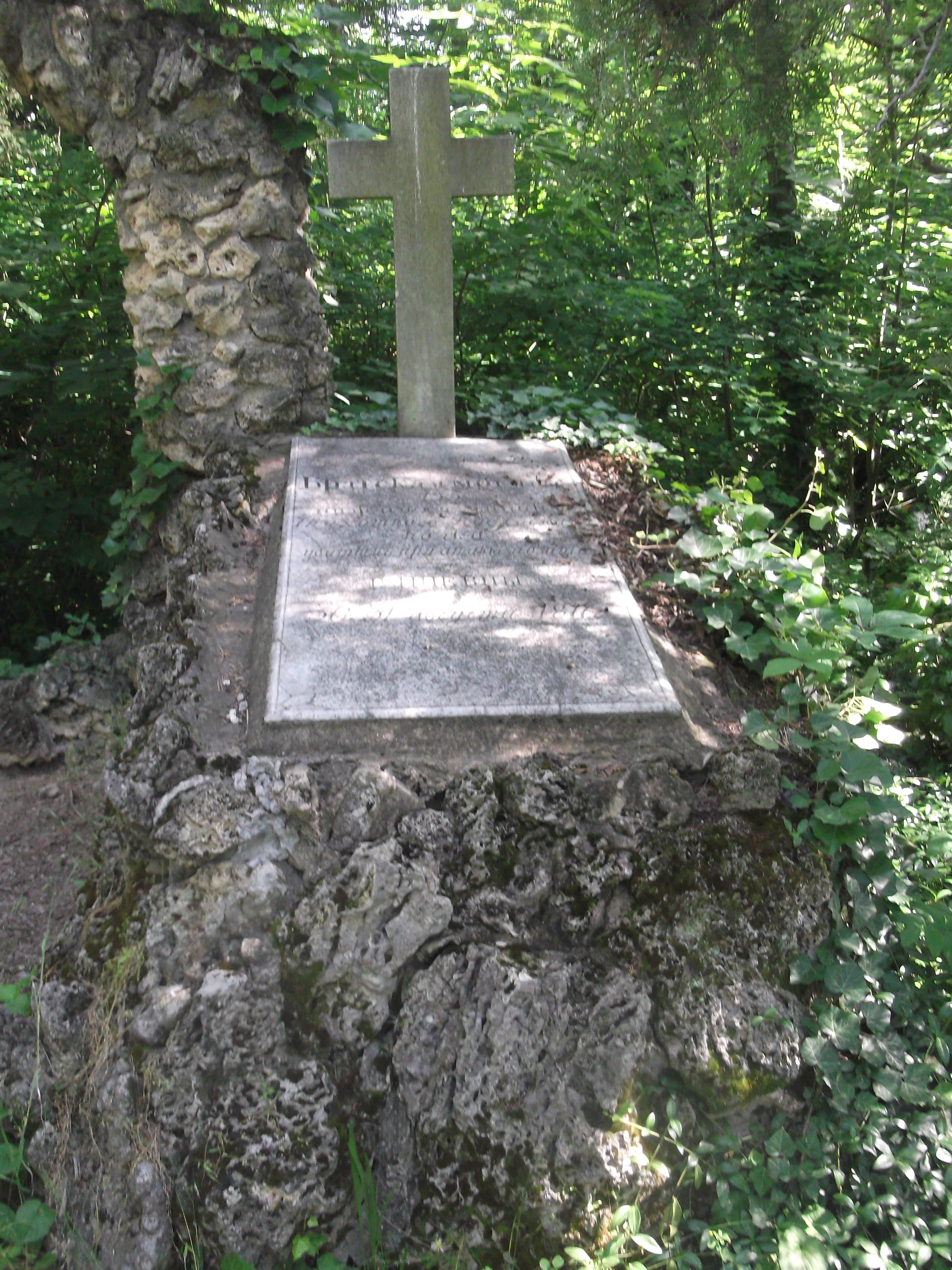
Monument Pleven dedicated to the 7th Reval Regiment for its role in the Siege of Plevna.

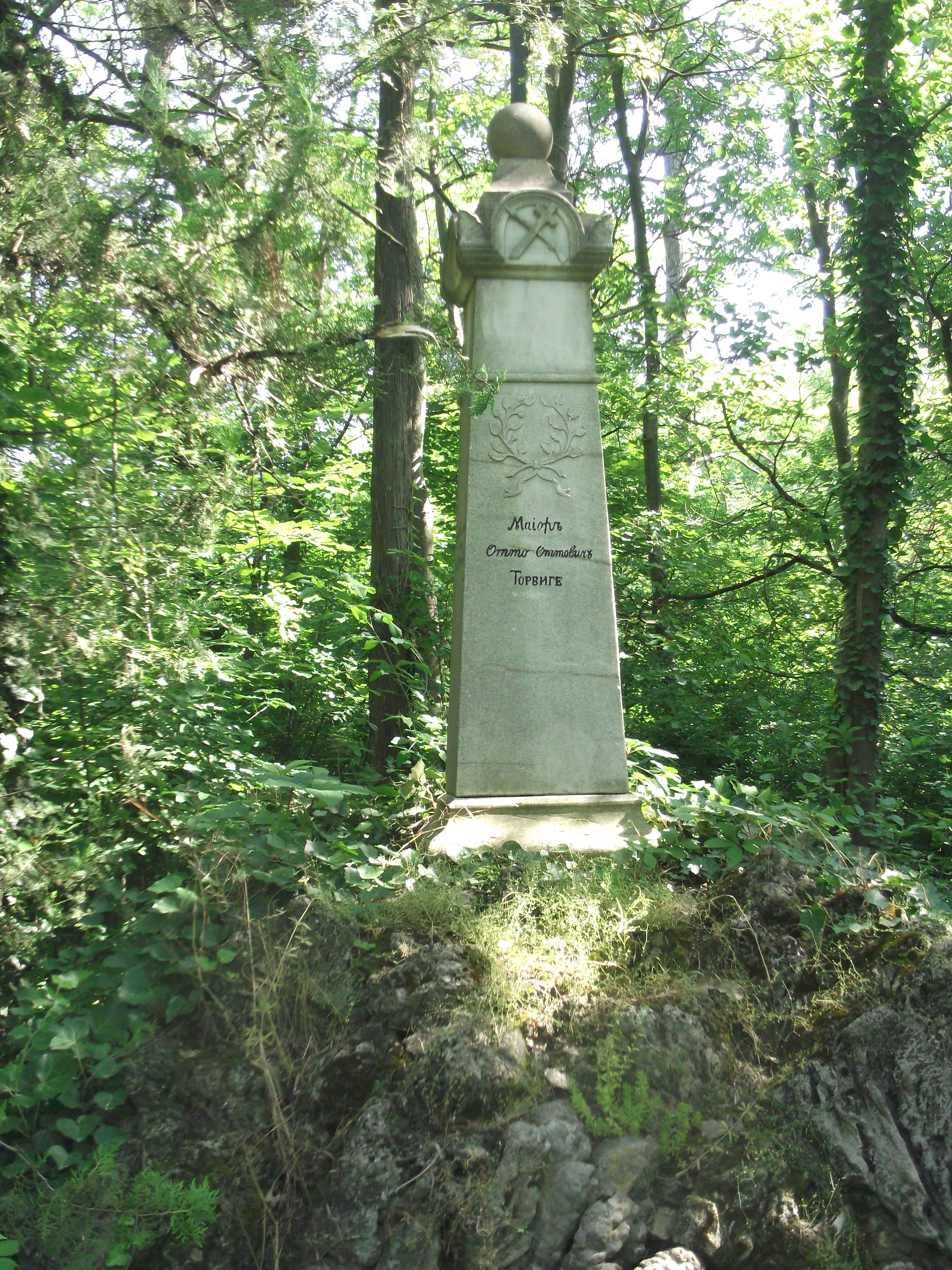
Mass grave of 7th Reval Infantry Regiment officers in Pleven

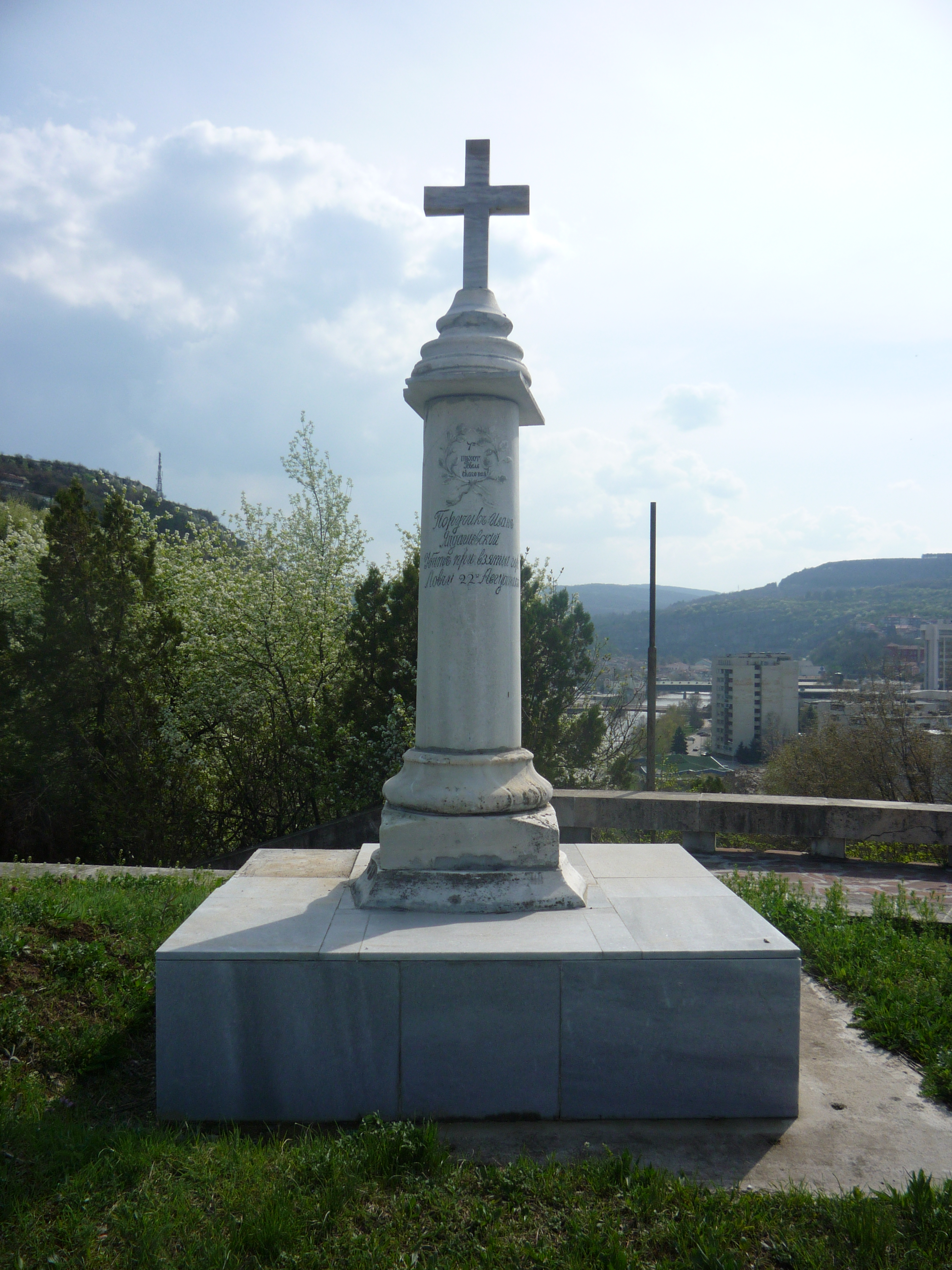
Grave of Lieutenant Ivan Yandashevsky, killed in 1877 during the Battle of Lovcha.
