= Battle of Małogoszcz =

Coordinates: 50°49′N 20°17′E

- Part of January Uprising
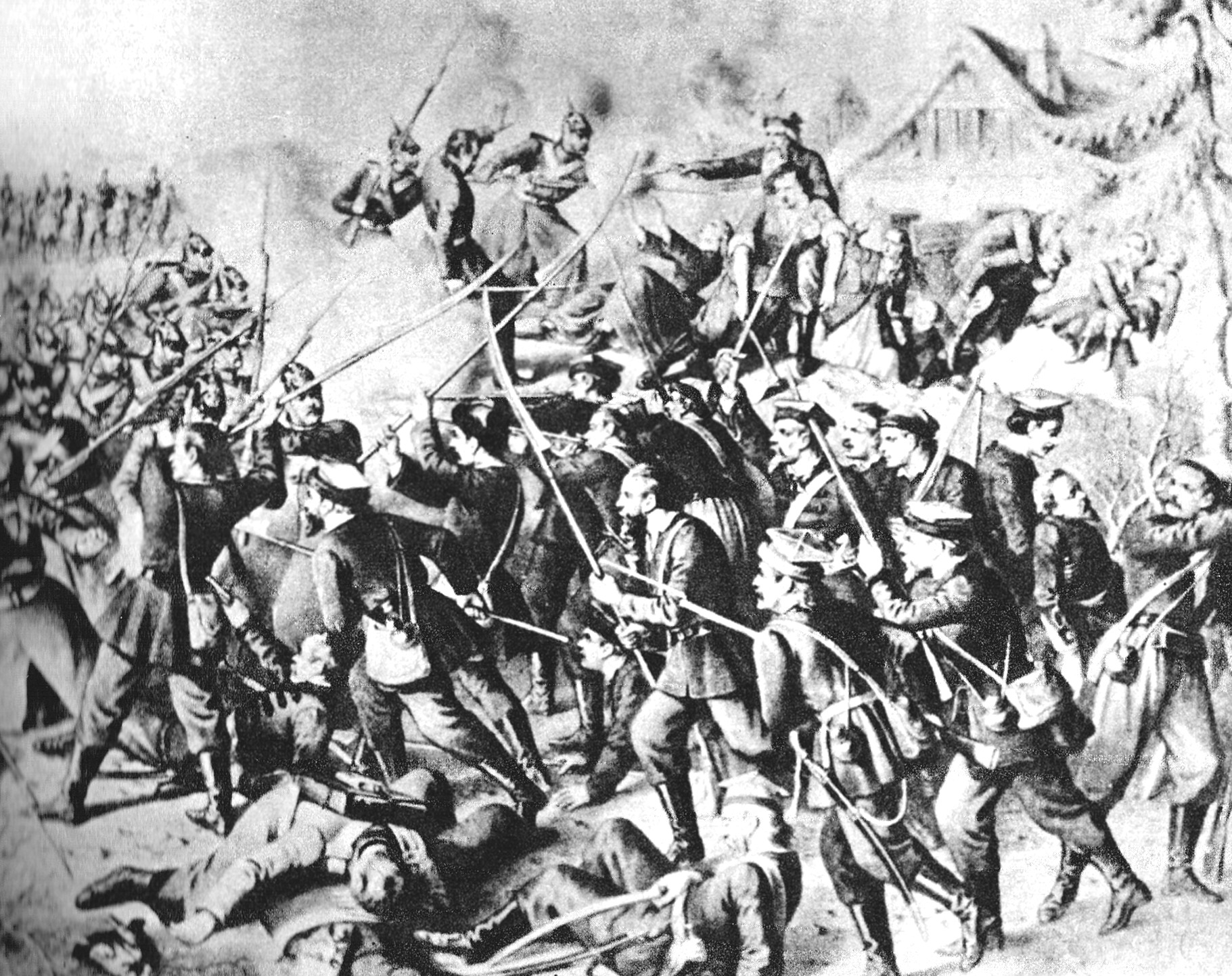
- Battle of Małogoszcz 1863
Date	24 February 1863
Location	Małogoszcz
Result	Indecisive

Belligerents
Polish National Government	Russia

Commanders and leaders
General Marian Langiewicz	Colonel Vladimir Dobrovolsky

Strength
2,600, 2 very small cannons	3,000, 6 heavy cannons

Casualties and losses
300	Unknown

The Battle of Małogoszcz took place on 24 February 1863 near Małogoszcz in the Holy Cross voivodeship. It was the one of biggest battles of the January Uprising. Polish general Marian Langiewicz began concentrating his forces in the Holy Cross Mountains; he wanted to attack Warsaw with them, but the Russians unveiled his attempts. He was attacked by a few Russian forces simultaneously. Langiewicz defeated them all in many skirmishes. Polish forces grew to 2,600 men most of them peasants armed with scythes. Russian colonel Vladimir Dobrovolsky attacked near Małogoszcz. The Russians shelled Polish positions, but their attack was eventually smashed by a Polish cavalry counterattack. Langiewicz ordered a retreat. The battle was indecisive - the Russians failed to annihilate the Polish army and the Polish failed to defend their positions.
