= 6th Libau Infantry Regiment =

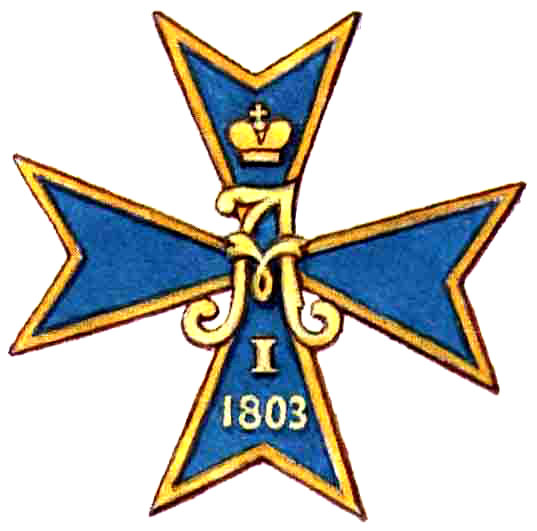
- Active: 1806–1918
- Country: Russian Empire
- Branch: (Russian Empire) Russian Imperial Army
- Role: Infantry
- Garrison/HQ: Novogeorgievsk Fortress
- Engagements: War of the Sixth Coalition; World War I

The 6th Libau Infantry Regiment was an infantry regiment of the Imperial Russian Army. It was formed on May 16, 1806 during the reign of Tsar Alexander I of Russia and disbanded in 1918. The regiment took part in warfare during the Napoleonic era, as well as World War I.

== History ==
The regiment celebrated its anniversary on June 8. The regiment was named after its patrons, various Prussian princes from 1822. The last of its patrons was Prince Friedrich Leopold of Prussia, who was its patron from 1885. In 1914, its garrison was the Novogeorgievsk Fortress and it was part of the 1st Brigade of the 2nd Infantry Division (Russian Empire). On 1 August 1914, the regiment dropped its patron's name from its title as a result of the outbreak of World War I against Germany.

== Bibliography ==
- Расписание Сухопутных войск 1836—1914 годов [Directory of the Army, 1836–1914] (in Russian). St. Petersburg: Типографни Генерального штаба [General Staff Printing House]. 1914.
- Caban, Wiesław (2001). Służba rekrutów Królestwa Polskiego w armii carskiej w latach 1831-1873 [Service of Recruits from Congress Poland in the Tsar's Army, 1831–1873] (in Polish). Warsaw: Wydawnictwo DiG. ISBN 83-7181-209-4.
- Kersnovsky, Anton Antonovich (1994). История русской армии [History of the Russian Army] (in Russian). Vol. 4. Moscow: Golos. ISBN 9785711700593.
