= 2nd Infantry Division (Russian Empire) =

Infantry division of the Imperial Russian Army (1806–1918)

- 2-я пехотная дивизия
- Active: 1806–1918
- Country: Russian Empire
- Branch: Imperial Russian Army
- Type: Infantry division
- Part of: XXIII Army Corps (by 1914)
- Garrison/HQ: Brest-Litovsk (1903); Novogeorgievsk (1913)
- Engagements: World War I: Battle of Tannenberg

The 2nd Infantry Division (2-я пехотная дивизия, 2-ya Pekhotnaya Diviziya) was an infantry formation of the Imperial Russian Army that existed from 1806 until the collapse of the Russian Empire in 1918. Prior to World War I, it was garrisoned in Novogeorgievsk.

== History ==
The division was originally formed in 1806 as the 5th Infantry Division and was renumbered as the 2nd Infantry Division in 1820.

=== World War I ===
At the outbreak of World War I in August 1914, the 2nd Infantry Division was part of the XXIII Army Corps under General Kiprian Kondratovich, which in turn belonged to General Alexander Samsonov's 2nd Army. The division was commanded by Lieutenant General Iosif Feliksovich Mingin.

During the Russian invasion of East Prussia, the division was heavily engaged in the Battle of Tannenberg (late August 1914). As the German 8th Army encircled Samsonov's forces, the 2nd Infantry Division suffered catastrophic casualties. On 26 August, the division's 7th Revel Infantry Regiment was virtually annihilated; out of an establishment of roughly 4,000 men, it lost approximately 3,000 soldiers (three-quarters of its strength) and ceased to exist as an effective combat unit. In the subsequent chaotic retreat, large portions of the XXIII Corps were destroyed or forced to surrender, and the division had to be completely rebuilt later in the war.

== Organization ==
By the early 20th century, the peacetime organization of the division consisted of the following units:

- 1st Brigade
  - 5th Kaluga Infantry Regiment
  - 6th Libau Infantry Regiment
- 2nd Brigade
  - 7th Revel Infantry Regiment
  - 8th Estlyand (Estonian) Infantry Regiment
- 2nd Artillery Brigade

== Commanders ==
The following officers commanded the division during its final decades:

- Lt. Gen. Alexander von Roop (July 1889 – April 1890)
- Lt. Gen. Alexander Korf (May 1890 – May 1894)
- Lt. Gen. Nikolai Dyagilev (July 1894 – August 1898)
- Lt. Gen. Vladimir Sakharov (November 1898 – May 1899)
- Lt. Gen. Mikhail Ustrugov (July 1899 – November 1902)
- Lt. Gen. Anatoly Stessel (May 1903 – August 1903)
- Lt. Gen. Mefody Kutsinsky (December 1903 – February 1907)
- Lt. Gen. Alexander Blagoveschensky (February 1907 – September 1912)
- Lt. Gen. Iosif Mingin (September 1912 – August 1914)
- Maj. Gen. Germogen Aksenov (August 1914; captured at Tannenberg)
