= Battle of Mormant =

1814 battle during the War of the Sixth Coalition

- Part of the Campaign of France of the Sixth Coalition
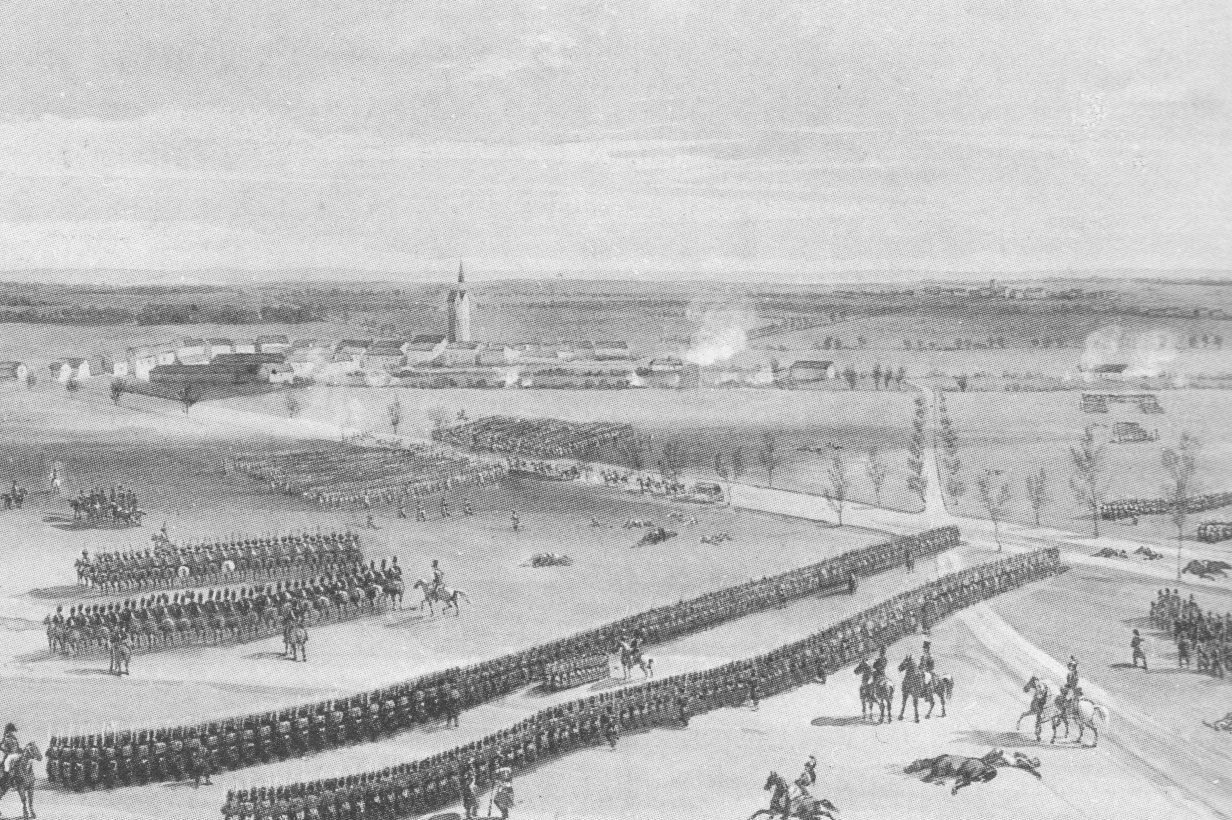
- Battle of Mormant by Jean-Antoine-Siméon Fort
Date	17 February 1814
Location	Mormant, France 48°36′28″N 02°53′19″E
Result	French victory

Belligerents
(First French Empire) France	(Austrian Empire) Austria (Kingdom of Bavaria) Bavaria (Russian Empire) Russia

Commanders and leaders
(First French Empire) Napoleon Bonaparte (First French Empire) Claude Victor-Perrin (First French Empire) Étienne Gérard (First French Empire) François Kellermann (First French Empire) Édouard Milhaud	(Austrian Empire) Karl von Schwarzenberg (Austrian Empire) Anton von Hardegg (Kingdom of Bavaria) Peter de Lamotte (Russian Empire) Peter Wittgenstein (Russian Empire) Peter Pahlen

Units involved
(First French Empire) II Corps (First French Empire) Reserve of Paris (First French Empire) V Cavalry Corps (First French Empire) VI Cavalry Corps	(Austrian Empire) V Corps (Kingdom of Bavaria) V Corps (Russian Empire) VI Corps

Strength
18,000–20,000	4,300–9,000

Casualties and losses
600–800	2,400–3,114, 9–14 guns
- Location within France

War of the Sixth Coalition:
Campaign in north-east France
current battle
Napoleon in command
Napoleon not in command

The Battle of Mormant (17 February 1814) was fought during the War of the Sixth Coalition between an Imperial French army under Emperor Napoleon I and a division of Russians under Count Peter Petrovich Pahlen near the town of Mormant, some 50 km (31 mi) southeast of Paris. Pahlen's outnumbered force was enveloped by cavalry and infantry, and nearly destroyed, with only about a third of its soldiers escaping.

Later in the day, a French column encountered an Austrian-Bavarian rearguard in the Battle of Valjouan. The Allied force was attacked and mauled by French infantry and cavalry, before it withdrew behind the Seine River. The Mormant-Valjouan actions and the Battle of Montereau the following day marked the start of a French counteroffensive intended to drive back Karl Philipp, Prince of Schwarzenberg's Allied Army of Bohemia, which concluded with Schwarzenberg’s army being driven back beyond Troyes on 24 February.

== Background ==
The Allied generals, particularly the Prussians, were exuberant following their victory over Napoleon at the Battle of La Rothière on 1 February 1814. They soon conceived a plan in which the main army under the Austrian Field Marshal Schwarzenberg advanced toward Paris via Troyes. Simultaneously, Prussian Field Marshal Gebhard Leberecht von Blücher's army took a more northerly route along the Marne River toward Meaux. When Napoleon realized that Blücher represented the more serious threat on 6 February, he began to shift his strength northward in order to deal with the Prussian field marshal. Leaving Marshals Victor and Nicolas Oudinot with 34,000 men to hold off Schwarzenberg's much larger army, Napoleon headed north on 9 February with 30,000 troops.

Napoleon landed some damaging blows on Blücher's army in the subsequent Six Days' Campaign. On 10 February in the Battle of Champaubert, the French army fell on Zakhar Dmitrievich Olsufiev's corps, which numbered only 4,000 infantry and 24 guns. Only 1,700 Russians escaped the disaster and the French made Olsufiev a prisoner. The next day, Napoleon defeated Fabian Gottlieb von Osten-Sacken's Russians and Ludwig Yorck von Wartenburg's Prussians in the Battle of Montmirail. For the loss of 2,000 killed and wounded, the French inflicted a loss of 3,700 men and 13 guns on the Allies. On 12 February, the French beat Sacken and Yorck again in the Battle of Château-Thierry. French losses were 600; the Allies lost 2,750 men and nine guns. Blücher attacked the French on 14 February and was nearly destroyed in the Battle of Vauchamps. The French sustained a loss of 600 men while the Allies lost 6,000 men and 16 guns. Altogether, Blücher's 56,000-man army lost over 16,000 soldiers and 47 guns during the week while Napoleon's losses added up to only 4,000.

While Napoleon was drubbing Blücher, Schwarzenberg's main army pushed back the forces of Marshals Victor and Oudinot. On the Allied right wing, Peter Wittgenstein's Russian corps advanced toward Nogent-sur-Seine while Karl Philipp von Wrede's Austro-Bavarian corps struck toward Bray-sur-Seine. On the Allied left wing, Crown Prince Frederick William of Württemberg's Württemberg corps moved toward Sens with Frederick Bianchi's Austrian corps on his left. Ignaz Gyulai's Austrian corps supported the left wing while Michael Andreas Barclay de Tolly's Allied Reserves supported the right wing. Wrede got across the Seine at Bray, causing the French to abandon Nogent to Wittgenstein. Victor and Oudinot retreated behind the Yerres stream, dangerously close to Paris. When the marshals called for help, Napoleon sent Marshal Jacques MacDonald to Guignes where he arrived on 14 February with a corps that was rebuilt by replacements from Paris. A blunder caused the army's wagon train to withdraw across the Marne near Paris, causing panic in the French capital.

Leaving Marshals Auguste de Marmont and Édouard Mortier to watch Blücher, Napoleon rapidly transferred his strength southward against Schwarzenberg's army. The French emperor arrived at Guignes on the evening of 16 February and planned to launch his offensive the next day. He found the army of Victor and Oudinot in good order and prepared to go over to the offensive.

== Battle ==
=== Armies ===
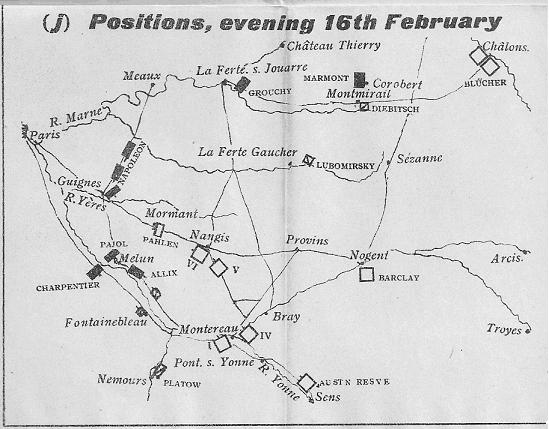
Map shows French (black) and Allied (white) positions on evening 16 February 1814.

Schwarzenberg had over 100,000 soldiers in his main army. A week later, on 23 February, the army counted Moritz von Liechtenstein's 2nd Light Division (4,000), Bianchi's I Corps (13,000), Gyulai's III Corps (11,000), Württemberg's IV Corps (10,000), Wrede's V Corps (21,000), Wittgenstein's VI Corps (15,000) and Barclay's Guard and Reserve Corps (30,000). This reckoning was made after the Battle of Montereau which cost the I Corps 2,000 casualties and the IV Corps 2,844 casualties. When Schwarzenberg heard about Blücher's defeats, he ordered his army to pull back behind the Seine. Instead of obeying, Wittgenstein aggressively pushed his corps west beyond Provins toward Nangis while his advanced guard under Pahlen reached Mormant. On 16 February, Wrede's corps was near Donnemarie-Dontilly except for Anton von Hardegg's division which was in Nangis. Württemberg's corps was near Montereau with advance guards near Melun. Bianchi's corps was south of the Seine between Moret-sur-Loing and Villeneuve-la-Guyard with advance guards farther west in Fontainebleau. Gyulai's corps was in Pont-sur-Yonne, Barclay's Russian Reserves were near Nogent while Liechtenstein's division and the Austrian Reserves were at Sens.

Napoleon massed his army near Guignes by the evening of 16 February. The Imperial Guard forces included Louis Friant's Old Guard division (4,500), Marshal Michel Ney's Young Guard divisions (3,000) and Guard cavalry under Louis Marie Laferrière-Levesque, Rémi Joseph Isidore Exelmans and Louis Michel Pac (3,000 total). The line troops consisted of Victor's II Corps (6,549 men, 40 guns), from Oudinot's VII Corps (7,516 men, 34 guns), from MacDonald's XI Corps (8,797 men, 37 guns), Édouard Jean Baptiste Milhaud's V Cavalry Corps (4,700) and François Étienne de Kellermann's VI Cavalry Corps (2,788). In addition, there were 4,500 men from Étienne Maurice Gérard's Reserve of Paris. Farther east near Melun were Henri François Marie Charpentier's Young Guard division (3,500), Michel-Marie Pacthod's National Guards division (5,000) and Pierre Claude Pajol's cavalry division (1,400). On the march to Guignes were Jean François Leval's division (4,500), Joseph Boyer de Rébeval's Young Guard division (3,300) and Antoine-Louis Decrest de Saint-Germain's division (1,300). Étienne Tardif de Pommeroux de Bordesoulle was also on hand with 581 newly recruited horsemen.

=== Mormant ===
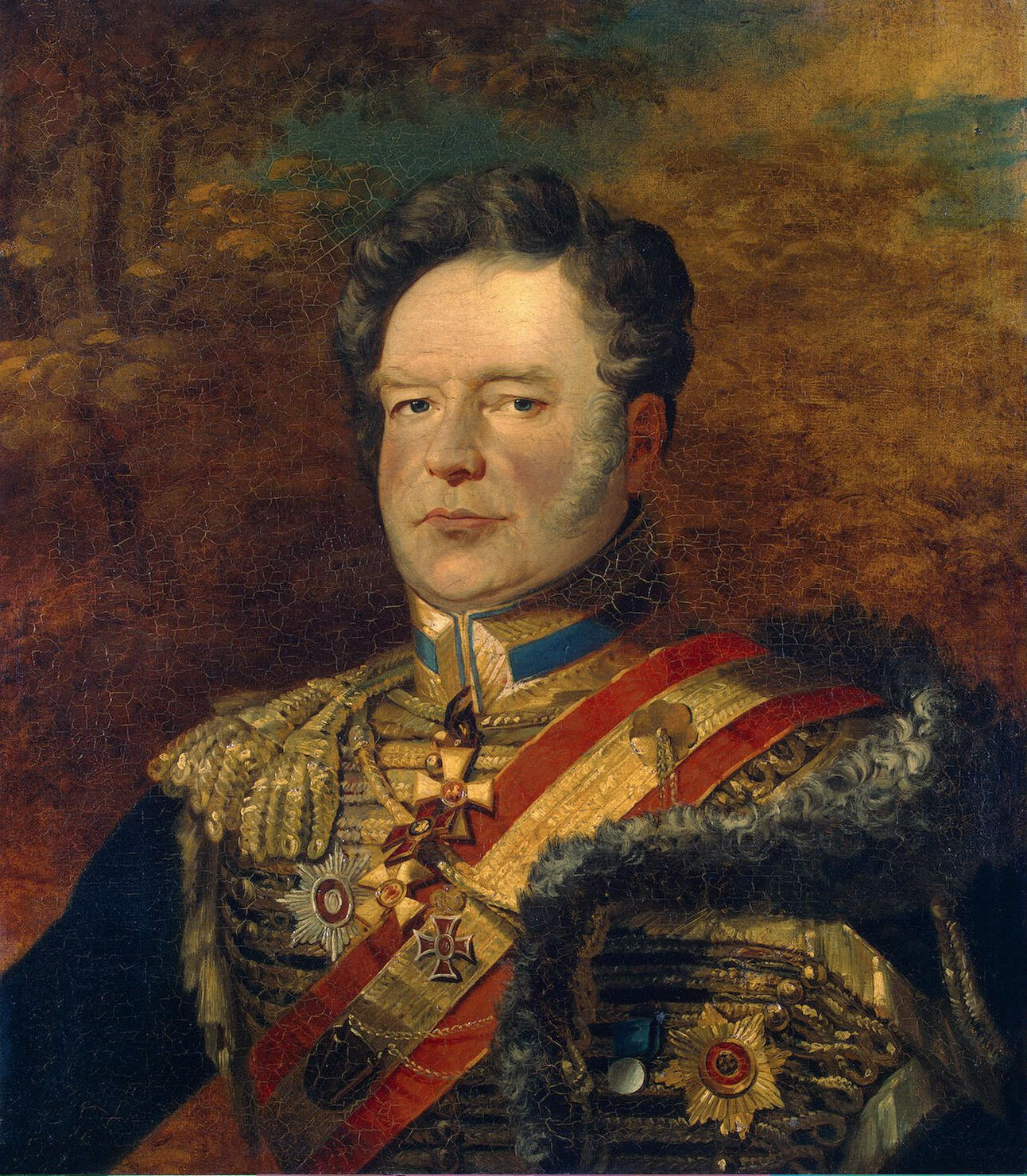
Theodor von Rüdiger

At Mormant, Pahlen became aware that large numbers of French troops were near his position. The Russian placed two battalions in Mormant and massed the rest of his troops on both sides of the highway with his artillery in the center. He was prepared to fight or to retreat. During the night, Wittgenstein received positive orders to withdraw so he marched his corps east toward Provins at dawn. He forwarded the orders to Pahlen but they came too late. At daybreak, Pahlen saw that he faced an overwhelming force and began to retreat. The Russian commanded 2,000–2,500-foot soldiers and 1,500–1,800 mounted troops. The infantry consisted of Selenginsk, Reval, Tenguinsk and Estonia Regiments and the 4th and 34th Jäger Regiments. The cavalry were led by Theodor von Rüdiger and included 14 squadrons from the Soumy Hussar, Olviopol Hussar and Tchougoulev Uhlan Regiments plus the Illowaiski XII, Rebrikov III and two unnamed Cossack regiments. Colonel Rosen's brigade was to the east at Bailly. Another source stated that the Grodno rather than the Olviopol Hussars were engaged, that the 20th and 21st Jägers were involved and that the Russians had 12 field pieces.

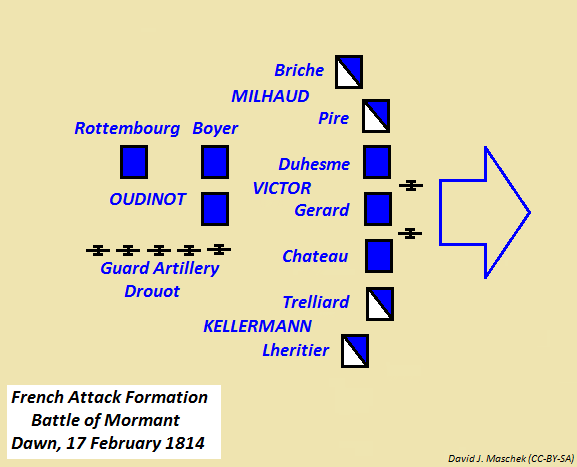
French attack formation: Battle of Mormant

At 5:00 a.m. the French infantry advanced with Guillaume Philibert Duhesme's II Corps division on the left, Gérard's Paris Reserve in the center and Louis Huguet-Château's II Corps division on the right. Victor's corps artillery marched in the intervals. Milhaud's corps included Hippolyte Piré's light cavalry division, André Briche's dragoon division and Samuel-François Lhéritier dragoon division. Kellermann's corps had only Anne-François-Charles Trelliard's dragoon division, fresh from the Spanish theater. Lhéritier was temporarily assigned to Kellermann. Milhaud commanded the left wing cavalry with Piré's horsemen deployed on Duhesme's left and Briche's troopers echeloned to Piré's left rear. Kellermann commanded the right wing cavalry with Trelliard's dragoons on Huguet-Château's right and Lhéritier's troopers echeloned to Trelliard's right rear. Behind the front-line units marched two VII Corps units on the north side of the highway. Pierre François Xavier Boyer's division was in the lead with Henri Rottembourg's division 200 m (219 yd) farther back. The Imperial Guard artillery moved along the main road beside the VII Corps. The remainder of the army followed.

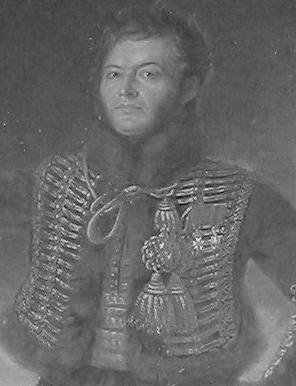
Jacques Subervie

Pahlen ordered the two battalions in Mormant to hold back the French at all cost in order to allow the rest of his command to escape. Four Cossack regiments opposed Kellermann's corps while Rüdiger's regular cavalry faced Milhaud's corps. Jacques Gervais, baron Subervie's brigade of Pire's division turned half-right and swooped down on the Russian skirmishers while the rest of Milhaud's cavalry advanced on Rüdiger's horsemen. In the center, Gérard's infantry forced its way into the village of Mormant, flushing its defenders into the open. Pierre Ismert, leading one of Trelliard's brigades, hurled the 4th Dragoons at the fleeing Russians, forcing many to surrender. On the right flank, Lhéritier's first brigade under August Étienne Lamotte dispersed the first two Cossack regiments. When the Illowaiski and Rebrikov Cossacks tried to intervene they were swept away by Lhéritier's second brigade led by Jean Antoine de Collaert. As Lhéritier's horsemen galloped after the routed Cossacks, the 16th Dragoons of Trelliard's division charged and broke a Russian square.

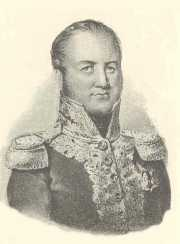
Étienne Gérard

On the north flank, Rüdiger deployed nine squadrons in the first line and five squadrons in the second line. Against the Russian horsemen, Milhaud had Piré's division (minus Subervie's brigade) in the first line, Gabriel Gaspard Montelégier's brigade in the second and Denis Éloi Ludot's in the third. Successive charges by Piré and Montelégier broke Rüdiger's squadrons and chased them off the battlefield with the French light cavalry in pursuit. Milhaud directed Montelégier to deal with the Russian infantry while sending Ludot on a sweep to block Pahlen's escape route. Without its supporting cavalry, Pahlen's infantry battalions were compelled to form into a square formation to defend against cavalry. Antoine Drouot aggressively pushed 36 guns from the French Guard artillery into the front line where they pummeled the Russians.

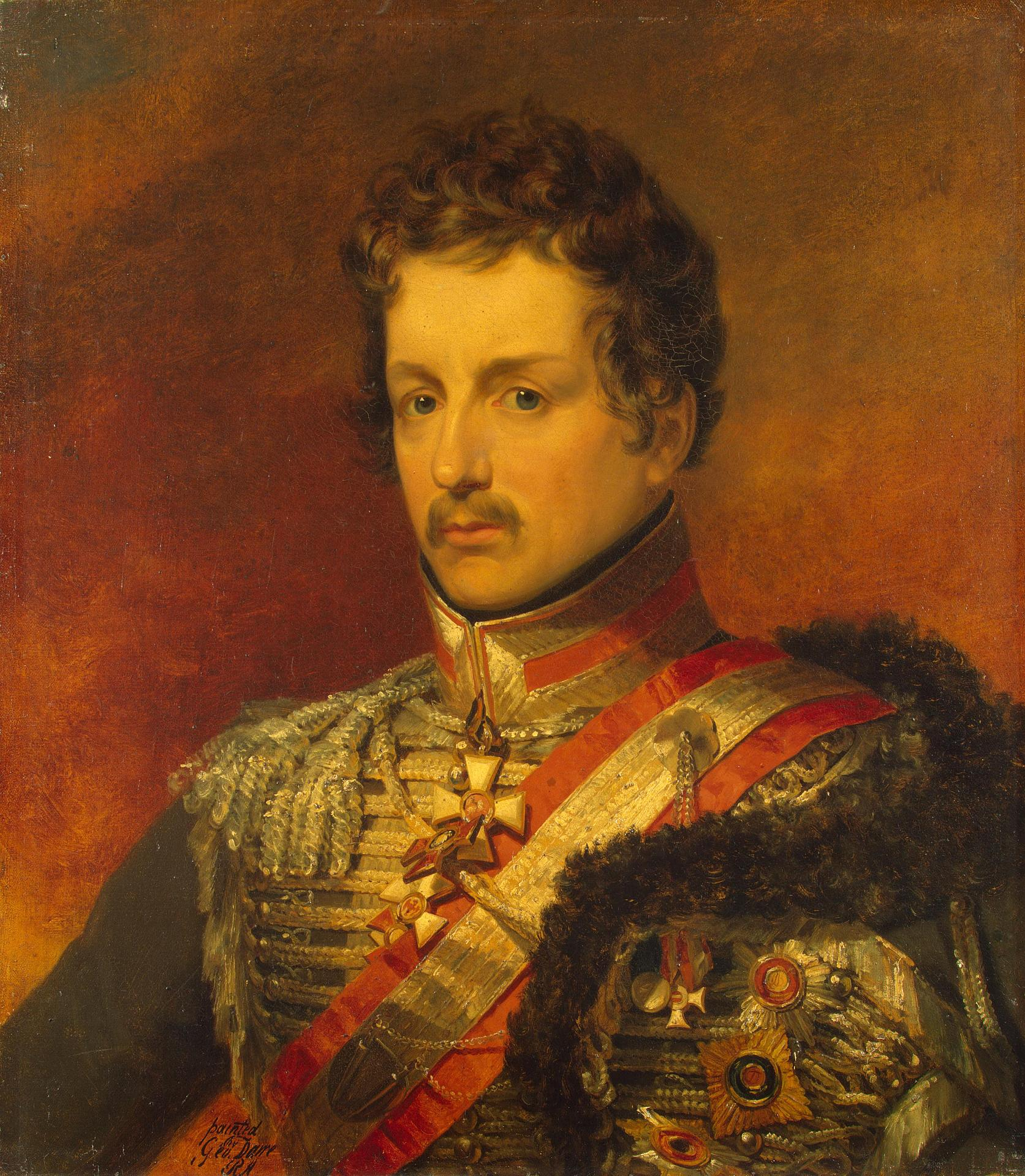
Peter Pahlen

Pahlen sent messengers to Nangis pleading for assistance, but Ignaz Splény de Miháldi's division had already marched off leaving only Anton Leonhard von Hardegg's Austrian division from Wrede's V Corps. Hardegg had some infantry battalions in Nangis and two cavalry regiments in Bailly. The Austrian division commander declined to assist his ally and ordered an immediate retreat. However, before they could get away, the two Austrian cavalry regiments were disordered by the fleeing Cossacks and then scattered by Piré's and August Lamotte's horsemen. The Russian infantry's withdrawal continued, leaving a trail of casualties from artillery fire. On the outskirts of Grandpuits they were finally brought to halt by Ludot's brigade which was now blocking the Russian line of retreat. Surrounded and hammered by artillery, the Russian battalions were all overrun by cavalry charges. The final square was broken when charged simultaneously by the brigades of Ludot and Ismert.

The Russians probably lost one-third of their cavalry and admitted the loss of 2,114-foot soldiers. The French claimed 9–12 guns and 40 caissons captured while the Russians said they saved two cannons. The French cavalry commanders reported losing 150 horsemen and Gérard reported only 30 casualties. Pahlen's survivors dispersed over the French countryside. Another authority stated that Pahlen lost 2,000 men and 10 guns. The Reval and Selenginsk Regiments lost so many men that they were withdrawn to Płock in Poland to reorganize.

=== Valjouan ===
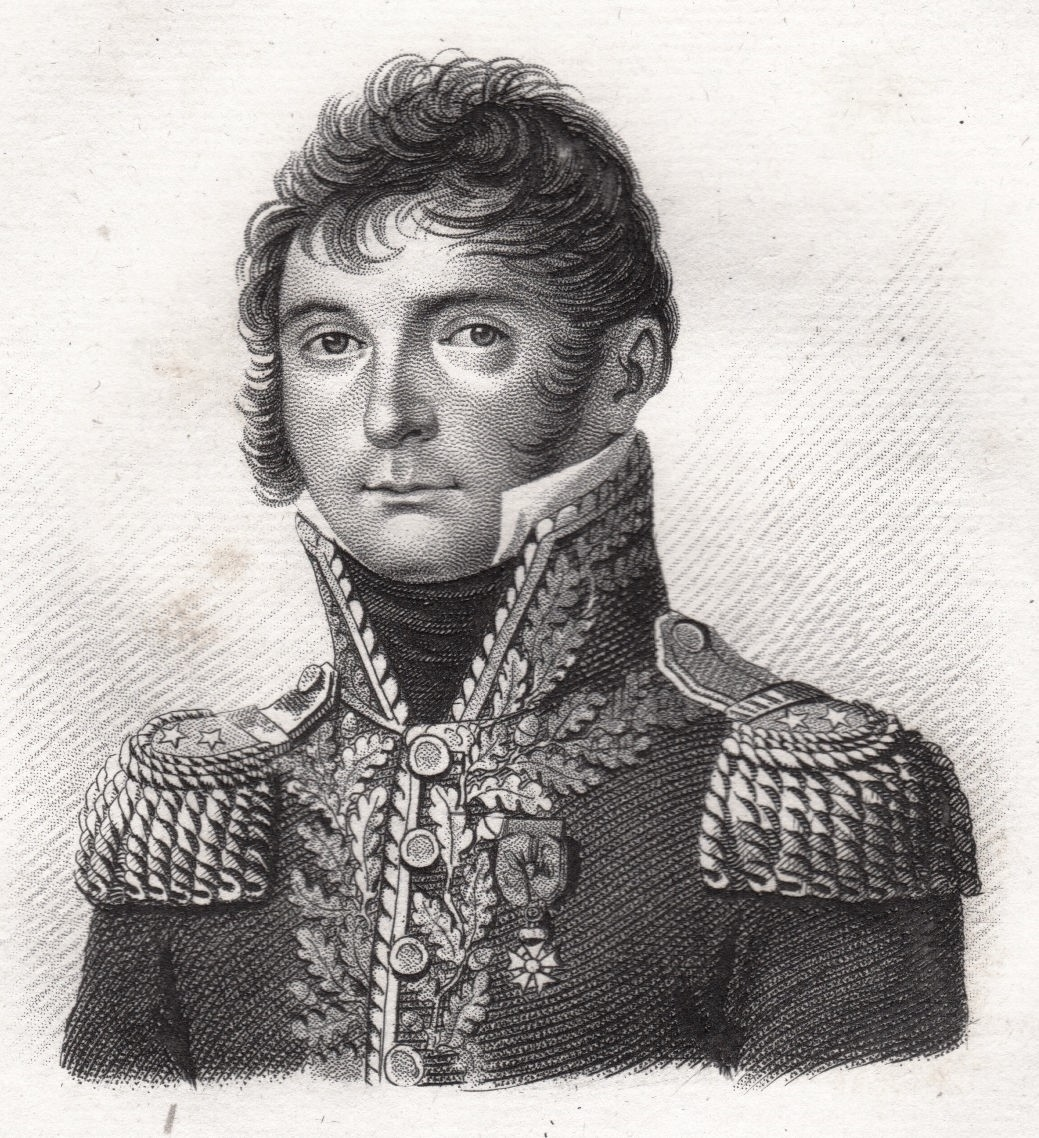
Samuel Lhéritier

At Nangis, Napoleon split his advancing army into three columns. Victor led the right-most column south toward Montereau. This force included the II Corps, Paris Reserve, Lhéritier's dragoons and Bordesoulle's recruits. The left-most column under Oudinot, with the VII Corps and Trelliard's dragoons, followed Wittgenstein's retreat east toward Provins. MacDonald's center column consisted of the XI Corps, Piré light horsemen and Briche's dragoons; it headed southeast toward Donnemarie. The French emperor held the Imperial Guard in reserve at Nangis. Wittgenstein retreated rapidly and crossed the Seine at Nogent that evening.

Victor's column departed Nangis at 1:30 p.m. and bumped into enemy resistance at Villeneuve-le-Comte about 3:00 p.m. Tipped off by Hardegg's survivors, Peter de Lamotte deployed the 3rd Bavarian Division on the Valjouan heights, blocking the road. Lamotte posted the 11th Bavarian Line Infantry in an advanced position at Villeneuve and Grand-Maison farm; his cavalry covered both flanks. The divisions of Hardegg and Splény were behind Lamotte; they began withdrawing as soon as the French appeared. The Schwarzenberg Uhlans Nr. 1 and Archduke Joseph Hussars Nr. 2, rallied from their earlier mauling by the French cavalry, were positioned to assist the Bavarian cavalry. Gérard, whose troops led the infantry column, decided to attack at once and asked Victor for help from the II Corps. Gérard deployed Lhéritier to the right and Bordesoulle to the left.

Supported by 12 cannons, Jacques Félix Jan de La Hamelinaye's brigade stormed Villeneuve and Grand-Maison at 3:30 p.m. Gérard held Georges Joseph Dufour's brigade in reserve. As the Bavarian foot soldiers bolted from both positions, they were set upon by Bordesoulle's cavalrymen. When some Allied cavalry tried to rescue the Bavarians, the French horsemen rode into them and chased them away. Next, the Iller Mobile Legion tried to intervene, only to be routed by the French recruits. Altogether, Bordesoulle's half-trained horsemen inflicted about 300 casualties on their foes. They apparently took no prisoners except a wounded Austrian officer who Bordesoulle had to personally save.

Peter de Lamotte formed his division into a square formation and began to retreat, followed by Bordesoulle. At some point during the withdrawal, the two Austrian mounted regiments were attacked by a large force of French cavalry and suffered 200 casualties in the melee. After Lamotte marched about 2 km (1.2 mi) toward Donnemarie, Gérard's infantry burst out of the woods and nearly broke up Lamotte's division. However, the French cavalry was absent this time, allowing the Bavarians to reform their battalions and resume their retreat. That evening, Wrede got the V Corps across the Seine at Bray, except for a rearguard at Mouy-sur-Seine.

=== Other actions ===
On 17 February, Charpentier's division and a task force under Jacques Alexandre Allix de Vaux advanced south from Melun, driving Ignaz Count Hardegg's division (Bianchi's I Corps) from Fontainebleau. Pajol and Pacthod left Saint-Germain-Laxis and headed southeast toward Montereau. They skirmished with Prince Adam of Württemberg's 1,000 infantry and cavalry during the day.

== Result ==
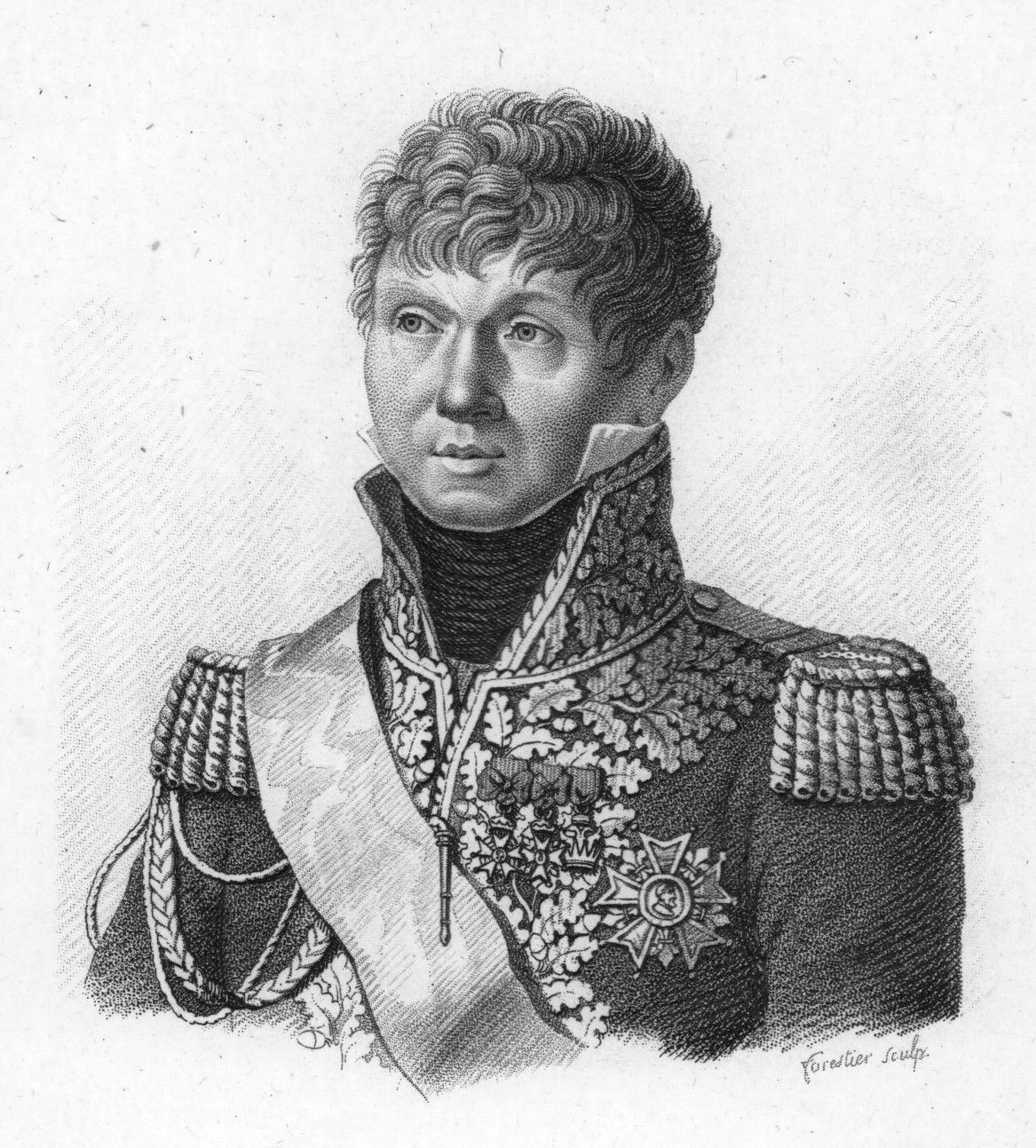
Claude Victor

The Allies had become overextended and Napoleon took advantage of this to strike hard at his enemies. George Nafziger estimated that the French sustained 800 casualties while the Allies lost 3,000 men and 14 guns at Mormant and Valjouan. Digby Smith gave casualties for the actions as 600 French and 3,114 Allied, with the French seizing 9 guns and 40 caissons. Pahlen was credited with 2,500 infantry and 1,800 cavalry of which 1,250 were Russian and 550 were Austrian. Though the author listed the Valjouan action, he did not list Bavarian numbers. The French brought 18,000–20,000 men to the battlefield. Gaston Bodart stated that the French brought 18,000 troops into action and sustained losses of 600. Bodart credited the Coalition with 5,000 infantry and 4,000 cavalry, and gave their losses as 2,400 men, including 550 Austrians.

Napoleon was angry at Victor for not pressing on that evening. He expected Victor to be at Montereau at 6:00 a.m. the next day. When Victor did not arrive before the town until 9:00 a.m., the French emperor replaced him with Gérard. Schwarzenberg ordered the Crown Prince of Württemberg to hold a bridgehead at Montereau for a day. The Battle of Montereau was fought on 18 February.

== Forces ==
=== French army ===
Units engaged from Emperor Napoleon's army at Mormant
Corps	Division	Brigade	Units	Strength
II Corps; Marshal; Claude Perrin Victor	1st Division; General of Brigade; Louis Château-Huguet	1st Brigade	24th Light Infantry Regiment, 1st Battalion	274
II Corps; Marshal; Claude Perrin Victor	1st Division; General of Brigade; Louis Château-Huguet	1st Brigade	19th Line Infantry Regiment, 1st Battalion	477
II Corps; Marshal; Claude Perrin Victor	1st Division; General of Brigade; Louis Château-Huguet	1st Brigade	27th Line Infantry Regiment, 1st Battalion	132
II Corps; Marshal; Claude Perrin Victor	1st Division; General of Brigade; Louis Château-Huguet	2nd Brigade	11th Light Infantry Regiment, 1st Battalion	219
II Corps; Marshal; Claude Perrin Victor	1st Division; General of Brigade; Louis Château-Huguet	2nd Brigade	2nd Line Infantry Regiment, 1st Battalion	154
II Corps; Marshal; Claude Perrin Victor	1st Division; General of Brigade; Louis Château-Huguet	2nd Brigade	56th Line Infantry Regiment, 1st Battalion	268
II Corps; Marshal; Claude Perrin Victor	1st Division; General of Brigade; Louis Château-Huguet	Artillery	5th Foot Artillery Regiment, 17th Company	59
II Corps; Marshal; Claude Perrin Victor	1st Division; General of Brigade; Louis Château-Huguet	Artillery	6th Foot Artillery Regiment, 10th Company	70
II Corps; Marshal; Claude Perrin Victor	1st Division; General of Brigade; Louis Château-Huguet	Artillery	Train Battalion	85
II Corps; Marshal; Claude Perrin Victor	1st Division; General of Brigade; Louis Château-Huguet	Artillery	Guns	4 12-pounders 5 6-pounders 6 4-pounders
II Corps; Marshal; Claude Perrin Victor	2nd Division; General of Division; Guillaume Philibert Duhesme	1st Brigade	26th Light Infantry Regiment, 1st Battalion	250
II Corps; Marshal; Claude Perrin Victor	2nd Division; General of Division; Guillaume Philibert Duhesme	1st Brigade	4th Line Infantry Regiment, 1st, 2nd and 4th Battalions	815
II Corps; Marshal; Claude Perrin Victor	2nd Division; General of Division; Guillaume Philibert Duhesme	1st Brigade	10th Line Infantry Regiment, 1st and 2nd Battalions	579
II Corps; Marshal; Claude Perrin Victor	2nd Division; General of Division; Guillaume Philibert Duhesme	2nd Brigade	6th Line Infantry Regiment, 1st and 2nd Battalions	?
II Corps; Marshal; Claude Perrin Victor	2nd Division; General of Division; Guillaume Philibert Duhesme	2nd Brigade	72nd Line Infantry Regiment, 1st Battalion	?
II Corps; Marshal; Claude Perrin Victor	2nd Division; General of Division; Guillaume Philibert Duhesme	2nd Brigade	93rd Line Infantry Regiment, 1st Battalion	?
II Corps; Marshal; Claude Perrin Victor	2nd Division; General of Division; Guillaume Philibert Duhesme	Artillery	9th Foot Artillery Regiment, 8th Company	34
II Corps; Marshal; Claude Perrin Victor	2nd Division; General of Division; Guillaume Philibert Duhesme	Artillery	Train Battalion	189
II Corps; Marshal; Claude Perrin Victor	2nd Division; General of Division; Guillaume Philibert Duhesme	Artillery	Guns	4 8-pounders 2 24-lb howitzers
Reserve of Paris; General of Division; Étienne Maurice Gérard	1st Division; General of Division; Georges Joseph Dufour	1st Brigade	12th Light Infantry Regiment, 3rd Battalion	?
Reserve of Paris; General of Division; Étienne Maurice Gérard	1st Division; General of Division; Georges Joseph Dufour	1st Brigade	29th Light Infantry Regiment, 6th Battalion	?
Reserve of Paris; General of Division; Étienne Maurice Gérard	1st Division; General of Division; Georges Joseph Dufour	1st Brigade	32nd Line Infantry Regiment, 8th Battalion	?
Reserve of Paris; General of Division; Étienne Maurice Gérard	1st Division; General of Division; Georges Joseph Dufour	1st Brigade	58th Line Infantry Regiment, 6th Battalion	?
Reserve of Paris; General of Division; Étienne Maurice Gérard	1st Division; General of Division; Georges Joseph Dufour	2nd Brigade	5th Light Infantry Regiment, 2nd Battalion	?
Reserve of Paris; General of Division; Étienne Maurice Gérard	1st Division; General of Division; Georges Joseph Dufour	2nd Brigade	15th Light Infantry Regiment, 7th Battalion	?
Reserve of Paris; General of Division; Étienne Maurice Gérard	1st Division; General of Division; Georges Joseph Dufour	2nd Brigade	135th Line Infantry Regiment, 3rd Battalion	?
Reserve of Paris; General of Division; Étienne Maurice Gérard	2nd Division; General of Division; Jacques de La Hamelinaye	1st Brigade	26th Line Infantry Regiment, 4th Battalion	?
Reserve of Paris; General of Division; Étienne Maurice Gérard	2nd Division; General of Division; Jacques de La Hamelinaye	1st Brigade	82nd Line Infantry Regiment	?
Reserve of Paris; General of Division; Étienne Maurice Gérard	2nd Division; General of Division; Jacques de La Hamelinaye	1st Brigade	86th Line Infantry Regiment	?
Reserve of Paris; General of Division; Étienne Maurice Gérard	2nd Division; General of Division; Jacques de La Hamelinaye	2nd Brigade	121st Line Infantry Regiment	?
Reserve of Paris; General of Division; Étienne Maurice Gérard	2nd Division; General of Division; Jacques de La Hamelinaye	2nd Brigade	122nd Line Infantry Regiment, 3rd Battalion	?
Reserve of Paris; General of Division; Étienne Maurice Gérard	2nd Division; General of Division; Jacques de La Hamelinaye	2nd Brigade	142nd Line Infantry Regiment, 2nd Battalion	?
Reserve of Paris; General of Division; Étienne Maurice Gérard	Corps Artillery	Artillery	6th Foot Artillery Regiment, 10th Company	?
Reserve of Paris; General of Division; Étienne Maurice Gérard	Corps Artillery	Artillery	9th Foot Artillery Regiment, 8th and 24th Companies	?
Reserve of Paris; General of Division; Étienne Maurice Gérard	Corps Artillery	Artillery	17th Foot Artillery, 5th Company	?
Reserve of Paris; General of Division; Étienne Maurice Gérard	Corps Artillery	Artillery	7th and 14th Train Battalions	?
Reserve of Paris; General of Division; Étienne Maurice Gérard	Corps Artillery	Artillery	Guns	4 12-pounders 11 6-pdrs and howitzers
V Cavalry Corps; General of Division; Édouard Milhaud	3rd Light Division; General of Division; Hippolyte Piré	5th Light Brigade; General of Brigade; Jacques Gervais Subervie	3rd Hussar Regiment	145
V Cavalry Corps; General of Division; Édouard Milhaud	3rd Light Division; General of Division; Hippolyte Piré	5th Light Brigade; General of Brigade; Jacques Gervais Subervie	26th Chasseurs à Cheval Regiment	296
V Cavalry Corps; General of Division; Édouard Milhaud	3rd Light Division; General of Division; Hippolyte Piré	6th Light Brigade	14th Chasseurs à Cheval Regiment	118
V Cavalry Corps; General of Division; Édouard Milhaud	3rd Light Division; General of Division; Hippolyte Piré	6th Light Brigade	27th Chasseurs à Cheval Regiment	137
V Cavalry Corps; General of Division; Édouard Milhaud	3rd Heavy Division; General of Division; André Briche	5th Heavy Brigade; General of Brigade; Gabriel Montelégier	2nd Dragoon Regiment	306
V Cavalry Corps; General of Division; Édouard Milhaud	3rd Heavy Division; General of Division; André Briche	5th Heavy Brigade; General of Brigade; Gabriel Montelégier	6th Dragoon Regiment	297
V Cavalry Corps; General of Division; Édouard Milhaud	3rd Heavy Division; General of Division; André Briche	5th Heavy Brigade; General of Brigade; Gabriel Montelégier	11th Dragoon Regiment	409
V Cavalry Corps; General of Division; Édouard Milhaud	3rd Heavy Division; General of Division; André Briche	6th Heavy Brigade; General of Brigade; Denis Éloi Ludot	13th Dragoon Regiment	134
V Cavalry Corps; General of Division; Édouard Milhaud	3rd Heavy Division; General of Division; André Briche	6th Heavy Brigade; General of Brigade; Denis Éloi Ludot	15th Dragoon Regiment	230
V Cavalry Corps; General of Division; Édouard Milhaud	Corps Artillery	Artillery	2nd Horse Artillery Regiment, 4th Company	50
V Cavalry Corps; General of Division; Édouard Milhaud	Corps Artillery	Artillery	3rd Horse Artillery Regiment, 2nd Company	44
V Cavalry Corps; General of Division; Édouard Milhaud	Corps Artillery	Artillery	6th Horse Artillery Regiment, 8th Company	43
V Cavalry Corps; General of Division; Édouard Milhaud	Corps Artillery	Artillery	8th, 12th and 14th Train Battalions	128
V Cavalry Corps; General of Division; Édouard Milhaud	Corps Artillery	Artillery	Guns	4 6-pounders 6 4-pounders 4 24-lb howitzers
VI Cavalry Corps; General of Division; François de Kellermann	4th Heavy Division; General of Division; Samuel-François Lhéritier temporarily attached from V Cavalry Corps	7th Heavy Brigade; General of Brigade; August Lamotte	18th Dragoon Regiment	208
VI Cavalry Corps; General of Division; François de Kellermann	4th Heavy Division; General of Division; Samuel-François Lhéritier temporarily attached from V Cavalry Corps	7th Heavy Brigade; General of Brigade; August Lamotte	19th Dragoon Regiment	177
VI Cavalry Corps; General of Division; François de Kellermann	4th Heavy Division; General of Division; Samuel-François Lhéritier temporarily attached from V Cavalry Corps	7th Heavy Brigade; General of Brigade; August Lamotte	20th Dragoon Regiment	109
VI Cavalry Corps; General of Division; François de Kellermann	4th Heavy Division; General of Division; Samuel-François Lhéritier temporarily attached from V Cavalry Corps	8th Heavy Brigade; General of Brigade; Jean Antoine de Collaert	22nd Dragoon Regiment	253
VI Cavalry Corps; General of Division; François de Kellermann	4th Heavy Division; General of Division; Samuel-François Lhéritier temporarily attached from V Cavalry Corps	8th Heavy Brigade; General of Brigade; Jean Antoine de Collaert	25th Dragoon Regiment	363
VI Cavalry Corps; General of Division; François de Kellermann	5th Heavy Division; General of Division; François Trelliard	9th Heavy Brigade; General of Brigade; Pierre Ismert	4th Dragoon Regiment	570
VI Cavalry Corps; General of Division; François de Kellermann	5th Heavy Division; General of Division; François Trelliard	9th Heavy Brigade; General of Brigade; Pierre Ismert	14th Dragoon Regiment	395
VI Cavalry Corps; General of Division; François de Kellermann	5th Heavy Division; General of Division; François Trelliard	9th Heavy Brigade; General of Brigade; Pierre Ismert	16th Dragoon Regiment	255
VI Cavalry Corps; General of Division; François de Kellermann	5th Heavy Division; General of Division; François Trelliard	10th Heavy Brigade; General of Brigade; François Léon Ormancey	17th Dragoon Regiment	339
VI Cavalry Corps; General of Division; François de Kellermann	5th Heavy Division; General of Division; François Trelliard	10th Heavy Brigade; General of Brigade; François Léon Ormancey	24th Dragoon Regiment	106
VI Cavalry Corps; General of Division; François de Kellermann	5th Heavy Division; General of Division; François Trelliard	10th Heavy Brigade; General of Brigade; François Léon Ormancey	27th Dragoon Regiment	502
I Cavalry Corps; General of Division; Étienne de Bordesoulle	Detachment	Replacements	Unknown companies destined for I Corps	500

=== Allied forces ===
Units engaged from the Allied armies at Mormant
Corps	Division	Brigade	Units
VI Corps; Advance Guard; Lieutenant General; Peter Petrovich Pahlen	14th Division	Brigade; Generalmajor Ljalin	Tenguinsk Infantry Regiment, 1 battalion
VI Corps; Advance Guard; Lieutenant General; Peter Petrovich Pahlen	14th Division	Brigade; Generalmajor Ljalin	Estonia Infantry Regiment, 1 battalion
VI Corps; Advance Guard; Lieutenant General; Peter Petrovich Pahlen	3rd Division	Brigade; Colonel Schelwinsky	Reval Infantry Regiment, 2 battalions
VI Corps; Advance Guard; Lieutenant General; Peter Petrovich Pahlen	3rd Division	Brigade; Colonel Schelwinsky	Selenguinsk Infantry Regiment, 1 battalion
VI Corps; Advance Guard; Lieutenant General; Peter Petrovich Pahlen	3rd Division	Brigade; Colonel Kapustin	20th Jäger Regiment, 1 battalion
VI Corps; Advance Guard; Lieutenant General; Peter Petrovich Pahlen	3rd Division	Brigade; Colonel Kapustin	21st Jäger Regiment, 1 battalion
VI Corps; Advance Guard; Lieutenant General; Peter Petrovich Pahlen	4th Division	Brigade; Colonel Rosen	Tobolsk Infantry Regiment, 2 battalions
VI Corps; Advance Guard; Lieutenant General; Peter Petrovich Pahlen	4th Division	Brigade; Colonel Rosen	Krementchug Infantry Regiment, 1 battalion
VI Corps; Advance Guard; Lieutenant General; Peter Petrovich Pahlen	4th Division	Brigade; Colonel Stepanov	4th Jäger Regiment, 2 battalions
VI Corps; Advance Guard; Lieutenant General; Peter Petrovich Pahlen	4th Division	Brigade; Colonel Stepanov	34th Jäger Regiment, 2 battalions
VI Corps; Advance Guard; Lieutenant General; Peter Petrovich Pahlen	3rd Hussar Division; Lieutenant General; Peter Petrovich Pahlen	Brigade; Generalmajor Delejanov	Grodno Hussar Regiment, 6 squadrons
VI Corps; Advance Guard; Lieutenant General; Peter Petrovich Pahlen	3rd Hussar Division; Lieutenant General; Peter Petrovich Pahlen	Brigade; Generalmajor Delejanov	Soumy Hussar Regiment, 5 squadrons
VI Corps; Advance Guard; Lieutenant General; Peter Petrovich Pahlen	3rd Hussar Division; Lieutenant General; Peter Petrovich Pahlen	Brigade; Generalmajor Dechterev	Loubny Hussar Regiment, 5 squadrons
VI Corps; Advance Guard; Lieutenant General; Peter Petrovich Pahlen	3rd Hussar Division; Lieutenant General; Peter Petrovich Pahlen	Brigade; Generalmajor Dechterev	Olviopol Hussar Regiment, 4 squadrons
VI Corps; Advance Guard; Lieutenant General; Peter Petrovich Pahlen	3rd Hussar Division; Lieutenant General; Peter Petrovich Pahlen	Brigade; Generalmajor Lissanewitz	Tchougouiev Uhlan Regiment, 8 squadrons
VI Corps; Advance Guard; Lieutenant General; Peter Petrovich Pahlen	3rd Hussar Division; Lieutenant General; Peter Petrovich Pahlen	Brigade; Cossacks	Vlassov II Cossack Regiment
VI Corps; Advance Guard; Lieutenant General; Peter Petrovich Pahlen	3rd Hussar Division; Lieutenant General; Peter Petrovich Pahlen	Brigade; Cossacks	Illowaisky XII Cossack Regiment
VI Corps; Advance Guard; Lieutenant General; Peter Petrovich Pahlen	3rd Hussar Division; Lieutenant General; Peter Petrovich Pahlen	Brigade; Cossacks	Rebrikov III Cossack Regiment
VI Corps; Advance Guard; Lieutenant General; Peter Petrovich Pahlen	3rd Hussar Division; Lieutenant General; Peter Petrovich Pahlen	Brigade; Cossacks	Tschermuschin II Cossack Regiment
VI Corps; Advance Guard; Lieutenant General; Peter Petrovich Pahlen	3rd Hussar Division; Lieutenant General; Peter Petrovich Pahlen	Brigade; Cossacks	Jaroslav Cossack Regiment
V Corps; Lieutenant General; Karl Philipp von Wrede	1st Austrian Division; Feldmarschall-Leutnant; Anton von Hardegg	Brigade; Colonel; Leopold von Geramb	Archduke Joseph Hussar Regiment Nr. 2, 6 squadrons
V Corps; Lieutenant General; Karl Philipp von Wrede	1st Austrian Division; Feldmarschall-Leutnant; Anton von Hardegg	Brigade; Colonel; Leopold von Geramb	1st Szekler Grenz Infantry Regiment, 2 battalions
V Corps; Lieutenant General; Karl Philipp von Wrede	1st Austrian Division; Feldmarschall-Leutnant; Anton von Hardegg	Brigade; Colonel; Leopold von Geramb	Horse Artillery Battery, six 6-pounders
V Corps; Lieutenant General; Karl Philipp von Wrede	1st Austrian Division; Feldmarschall-Leutnant; Anton von Hardegg	Brigade; Colonel; Adolph von Mengen	Schwarzenberg Uhlan Regiment Nr. 1, 6 squadrons
V Corps; Lieutenant General; Karl Philipp von Wrede	1st Austrian Division; Feldmarschall-Leutnant; Anton von Hardegg	Brigade; Colonel; Adolph von Mengen	3rd Jäger Battalion
V Corps; Lieutenant General; Karl Philipp von Wrede	3rd Bavarian Division; Lieutenant General; Peter de Lamotte	Brigade; Generalmajor; Georg von Habermann	7th Bavarian Infantry Regiment, 1 battalion
V Corps; Lieutenant General; Karl Philipp von Wrede	3rd Bavarian Division; Lieutenant General; Peter de Lamotte	Brigade; Generalmajor; Georg von Habermann	11th Bavarian Infantry Regiment, 2 battalions
V Corps; Lieutenant General; Karl Philipp von Wrede	3rd Bavarian Division; Lieutenant General; Peter de Lamotte	Brigade; Generalmajor; Georg von Habermann	Unterdonau Landwehr Regiment, 1st Battalion
V Corps; Lieutenant General; Karl Philipp von Wrede	3rd Bavarian Division; Lieutenant General; Peter de Lamotte	Brigade; Generalmajor; Georg von Habermann	Iller Landwehr Regiment, 1st Battalion
V Corps; Lieutenant General; Karl Philipp von Wrede	3rd Bavarian Division; Lieutenant General; Peter de Lamotte	Brigade; Generalmajor; Franz von Deroy	5th Bavarian Infantry Regiment, 1 battalion
V Corps; Lieutenant General; Karl Philipp von Wrede	3rd Bavarian Division; Lieutenant General; Peter de Lamotte	Brigade; Generalmajor; Franz von Deroy	8th Bavarian Infantry Regiment, 1 battalion
V Corps; Lieutenant General; Karl Philipp von Wrede	3rd Bavarian Division; Lieutenant General; Peter de Lamotte	Brigade; Generalmajor; Franz von Deroy	9th Bavarian Infantry Regiment, 1 battalion
V Corps; Lieutenant General; Karl Philipp von Wrede	3rd Bavarian Division; Lieutenant General; Peter de Lamotte	Brigade; Generalmajor; Franz von Deroy	Iller Landwehr Regiment, 2nd Battalion
V Corps; Lieutenant General; Karl Philipp von Wrede	3rd Bavarian Division; Lieutenant General; Peter de Lamotte	Brigade; Generalmajor; Franz von Deroy	Isar Landwehr Regiment, 1st Battalion
V Corps; Lieutenant General; Karl Philipp von Wrede	3rd Bavarian Division; Lieutenant General; Peter de Lamotte	Brigade; Generalmajor Elbracht	4th Bavarian Chevau-léger Regiment, 1st–4th Squadrons
V Corps; Lieutenant General; Karl Philipp von Wrede	3rd Bavarian Division; Lieutenant General; Peter de Lamotte	Brigade; Generalmajor Elbracht	5th Bavarian Chevau-léger Regiment, 1st–4th Squadrons
V Corps; Lieutenant General; Karl Philipp von Wrede	3rd Bavarian Division; Lieutenant General; Peter de Lamotte	Artillery	Horse Artillery Battery, six 6-pounders
V Corps; Lieutenant General; Karl Philipp von Wrede	3rd Bavarian Division; Lieutenant General; Peter de Lamotte	Artillery	Foot Artillery Battery, eight 6-pounders

== Notes ==
Preceded by Battle of Garris	Napoleonic Wars; Battle of Mormant	Succeeded by Battle of Montereau
