= 5th Kaluga Infantry Regiment =

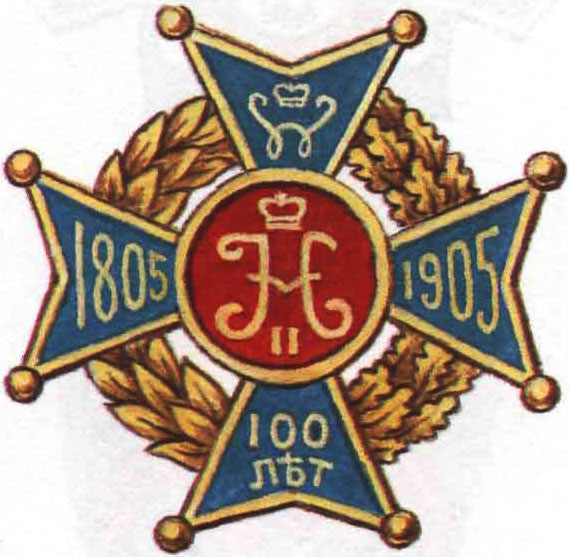
- Active: 1805–1918
- Country: Russian Empire
- Branch: (Russian Empire) Russian Imperial Army
- Role: Infantry
- Engagements: French Invasion of Russia; November Uprising; Russo-Turkish War; World War I Russian Civil War

The 5th Kaluga Infantry Regiment of Emperor Wilhelm I (Russian: 5-й пехотный Калужский Императора Вильгельма 1-го полк) was a regiment of the period of the Russian Empire.

== History ==
- Formed on August 28, 1805, with two battalions from regiments of Musketeers: Sofia and Lithuania during the reign of Tsar Alexander I of Russia, as Kaluga musketeer Regiment,
- February 22, 1811 name: Kaluga infantry regiment,
- February 6, 1818 name: Regiment of Prince William of Prussia,
- January 28, 1833-for the regiment included 3 Marine Regiment and re-organize how you are working a whole regiment,
- July 25, 1840 name: Regiment. Prussian
- March 19, 1857 name: Kaluga Regiment. Prussian
- December 23, 1860 name: Kaluga Regiment. His Majesty The King Of Prussia,
- March 25, 1864 name: 5 Kaluga Regiment. His Majesty The King Of Prussia,
- February 17, 1871 name: 5 Kaluga Regiment. His Imperatorskiej The Height Of The Emperor Of The German King Of Prussia,
- February 27, 1888 name: Kaluga Regiment. Emperor Wilhelm I,
- August 1, 1914 name: Kaluga infantry regiment.

Pułkowe Festival: August 30. Dislocation in 1914: Modlin (Новогеоргиевск). Rozformowany in 1918.

=== The assignment of 1 January 1914 ===
23rd Corps (23 АК, 23 армейский корпус), Warsaw, Poland 2 Infantry Division (2-й пехотной дивизии), Modlin 1 Infantry Brigade, Modlin 5 KalugaInfantry Regiment (5-й пехотный Калужский Императора Вильгельма 1-го полк), Modlin (Новогеоргиевск).

== Commander ==
11.04.1911-7.03.1913 Colonel Konstantin Yakovlevich Biciutko, 8 26.04.1913-1.04.1914 Col. Nikolai Petrovich Zinoviev, 2.09.1915-after 1.01.1916 Col. Aleksandr Petrovich Kabajew.

== Participation in wars ==
1812-Patriotic War (Russo-French) 1831-the Suppression of the November uprising in Poland. 1877-1877-Russo-Turkish war, 1914-1918-World War I

== Characters ==
Gieorgiewski regimental banner with the inscription: "for the capture of Łowczy22 August 1877 year ' and ' 1805-1905". The orders of the Emperor of 28.08.1905. Banner decorated with Aleksandrowską Band Jubilee. Awarded for merit. Award from 13.04.1818, Stamps with the word "Wyrożniający", on the caps the State. Award from 27.04.1814, Awarded for bravery in the battle of Bar-Siur-Obe. Honorable mention from 15.02.1814, Trumpet Gieorgiewskie with the words "fight for Warsaw 25 and August 26, 1831. Award from 6.12.1931. Regimental banner was awarded the Ribbon by the King of Prussia in 1868, Banner 4 battalion was awarded the Ribbon 19.07.1888. The regiment had a badge pułkową, laid down 8.07.1911 r. Maltese cross in gold enamel blue and red, on a wreath of Laurel leaves and oak. Ranty gold from the rings. On the badge: "1805-1905" and "100 years", and monograms: at the top of the Emperor William I, in the center of the circle in red of the Emperor Nicholas II. He also had the regimental colors of the badge-sided with subtitles "in the memory of the century 5 Kałużskiego infantry regiment. Emperor Wilhelm I ".
