= Vladimir Dobrovolsky =

19th century Russian major general, in the Russo-Turkish War

Vladimir Mikhailovich Dobrovolsky
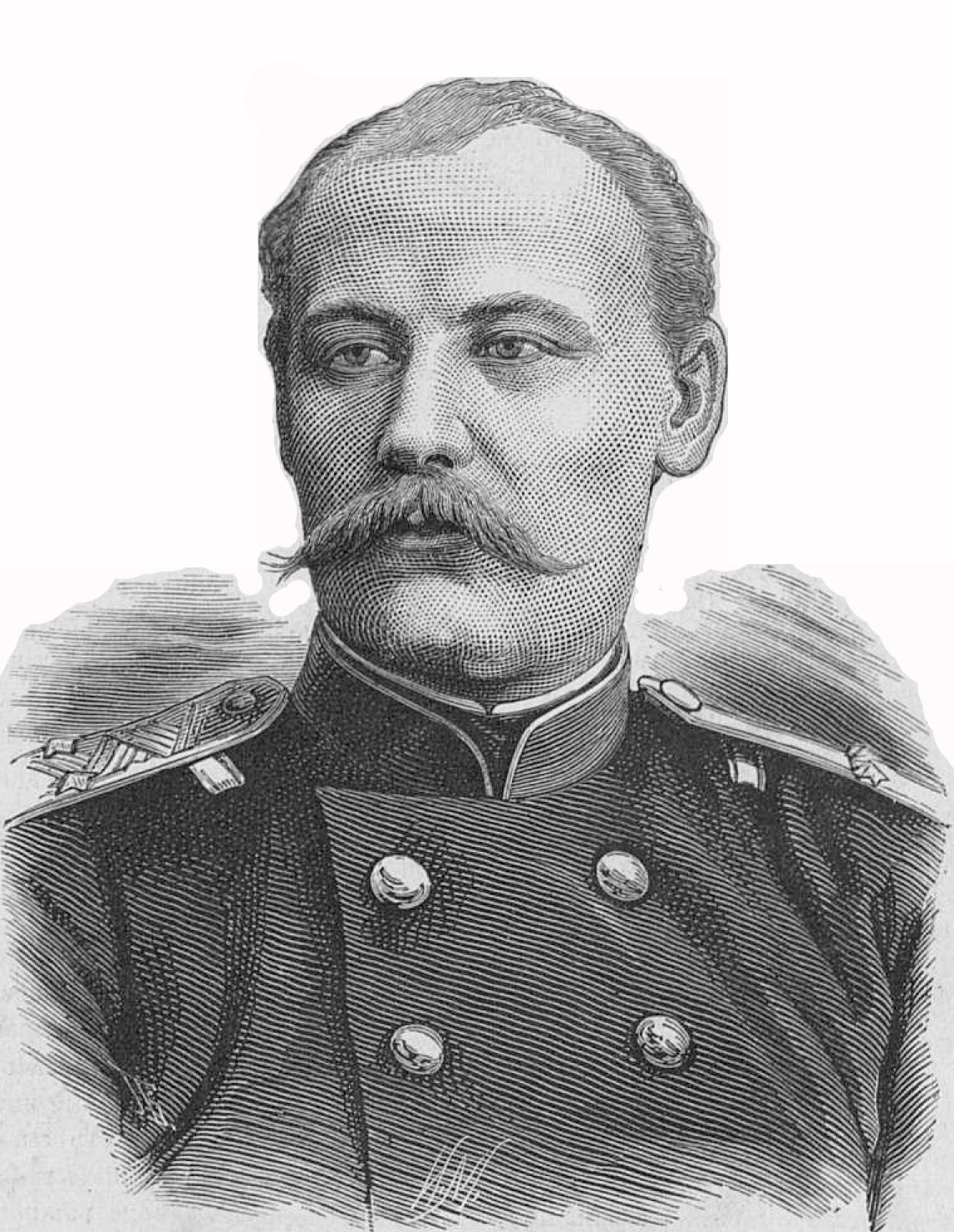
- Dobrovolsky in 1877
- Born: 8 April 1834
- Died: 11 September 1877 (aged 43); Near Pleven
- Burial place: Nikolskoe Cemetery, Alexander Nevsky Lavra, St. Petersburg, Russia
- Military career
- Allegiance: Russian Empire
- Branch: Imperial Russian Army
- Service years: 1834 — 1877
- Rank: Major General
- Conflicts: January Uprising; Russo-Turkish War; Battle of Lovcha; Siege of Plevna †
- Awards: Order of Saint Stanislaus 2nd class (1862); Order of Saint Vladimir 4th class. (1864); Order of Saint Anna 2nd class. (1865); Order of Saint Vladimir 3rd class (1871)

Vladimir Mikhailovich Dobrovolsky (Russian: Владимир Михайлович Добровольский; 8 April [O.S. 27 March] 1834 – 11 September [O.S. 30 August] 1877) was a Russian major general who was most notable for his service in the Russo-Turkish War (1877–1878).

== Biography ==
Vladimir Dobrovolsky was born on 8 April [O.S. 27 March] 1834 and was educated in the Pavlovsk Cadet Corps, from which he graduated on 13 August 1852 as an ensign in the Life Guards Dragoon Regiment. He served for five years with this regiment and in 1857 entered the main course of the Nikolaev Academy of the General Staff.

After graduating from the academy, Dobrovolsky in 1860 was transferred to the General Staff as a lieutenant colonel and in 1862 was awarded the Order of St. Stanislav 2nd degree. He was soon appointed chief of staff of the 7th Infantry Division.

In 1863, as an assistant to the head of the Radom detachment, he took part in the suppression of the January Uprising, receiving the rank of colonel and the Order of St. Vladimir of the 4th degree with swords and a bow in 1864.

In 1865 V.M. Dobrovolsky received the Order of St. Anna, 2nd degree in 1867 and was appointed commander of the 6th Grenadier Tauride Regiment.

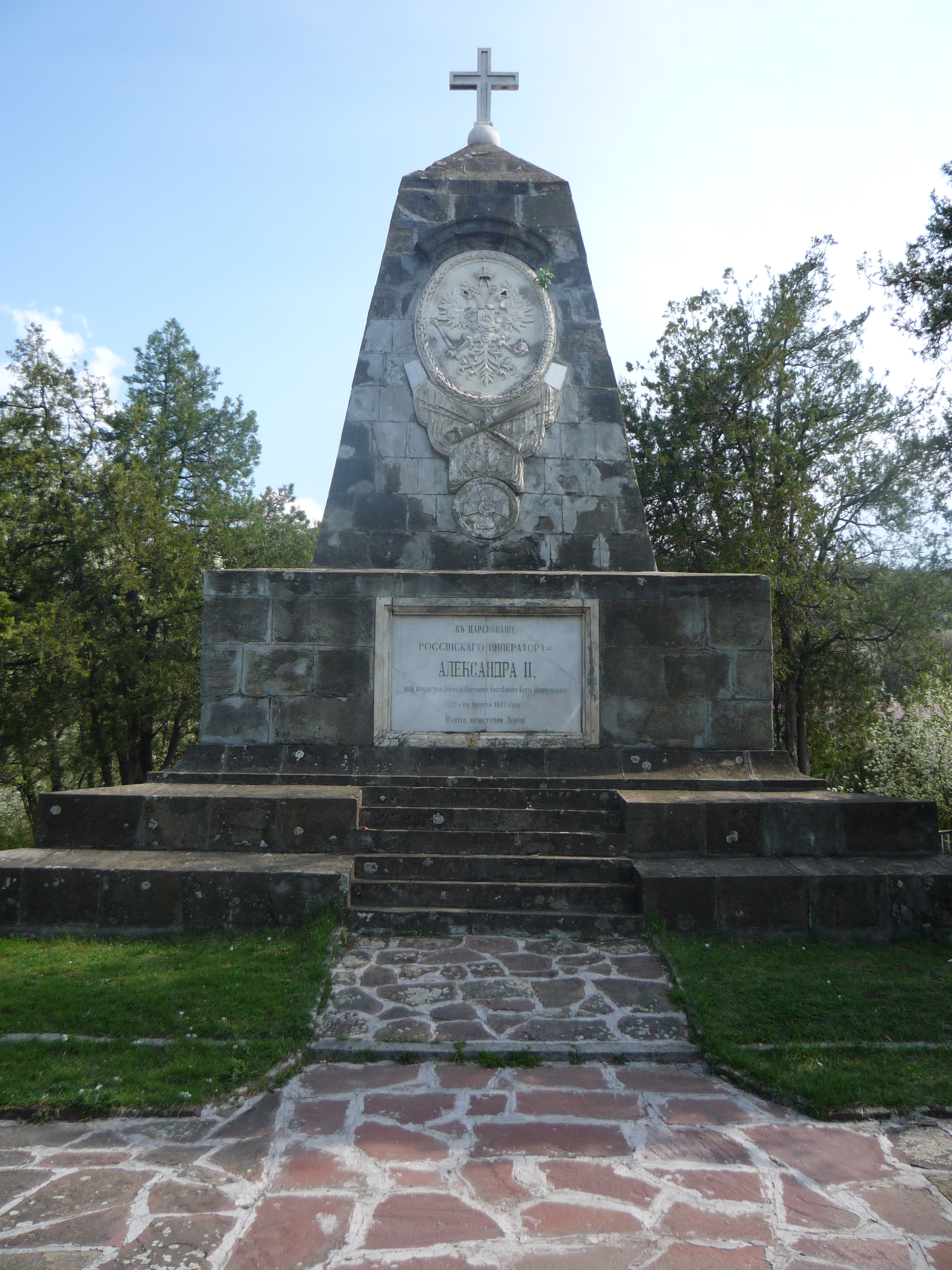
The white monument erected in memory of the liberation of Lovcha from the Ottoman yoke on 22 August 1877. It depicts all the units of the Russian army that took part in the fighting.

On 30 August 1871, he was promoted to major general and received the Order of St. Vladimir of the 3rd degree, Vladimir Mikhailovich Dobrovolsky was given command of the 3rd Infantry Brigade, with which he participated in the war with Turkey in 1877. Dobrovolsky distinguished himself at the Battle of Lovcha as a brave and proactive military commander, but some aspects of his activities such as violation of disposition, untimely conduct of attacks on Turkish fortifications, poor interaction with neighboring detachments and columns were subsequently criticized.

Dobrovolsky was not destined to deploy his military talents: on 30 August near Plevna, he was seriously wounded by a grenade, being at the head of his troops, during the assault on the Krishinsky redoubt. When eight riflemen, who made up his personal cover and, as orderlies and messengers, carried out various orders, carried him off the battlefield, Dobrovolsky asked, through Mikhail Skobelev, to convey to the commander-in-chief, Grand Duke Nikolai Nikolaevich the Elder, his dying request that these eight riflemen be awarded military insignia order. This request was fulfilled by the Grand Duke. Dobrovolsky died a few hours later.

Dobrovolsky himself, as if anticipating his death, made his will three days before, and on the eve of the battle he expressed himself even more definitely:

Thank God, he managed to acquire good horses and a reliable carriage; at least after tomorrow they will transport my body to Russia.

On 21 September, Vladimir Mikhailovich Dobrovolsky was solemnly buried in Saint Petersburg in the Alexander Nevsky Lavra.
