= Battle of Lovcha =

1877 battle of the Russo-Turkish War (1877–1878)

Coordinates: 43°8′5″N 24°43′2″E

- Part of the Russo-Turkish War (1877–1878) and Siege of Plevna
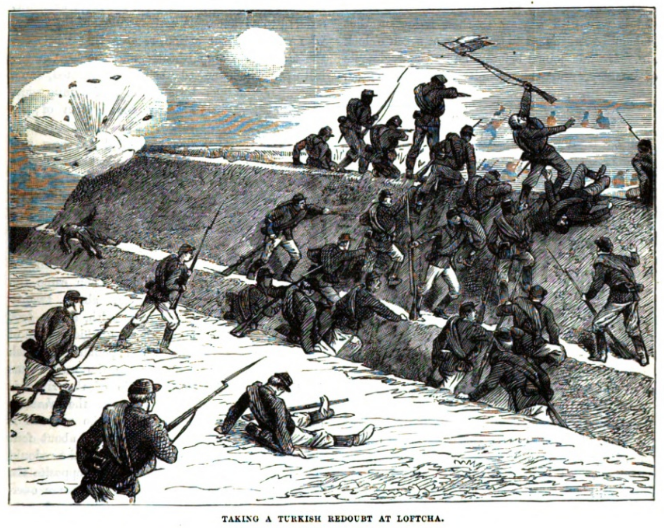
- Taking a Turkish redout during the battle of Lovcha (Cassell's Illustrated History of the Russo-Turkish War, 1885)
Date	1–3 September 1877
Location	Lofça District, Tırnova Sanjak, Tuna Province, Ottoman Empire (today Lovech, Bulgaria)
Result	Russian victory

Belligerents
Russian Empire	Ottoman Empire

Commanders and leaders
Alexander Imeretinsky; Mikhail Skobelev; Vladimir Dobrovolsky	Rifat Pasha; Osman Pasha; Ali Paşa

Strength
22,703	8,000

Casualties and losses
371 killed, 1,145 wounded	2,200 killed or wounded 2,000 prisoners

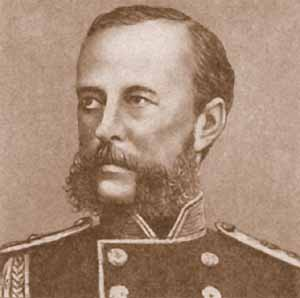
General Alexander Imeretinsky

The Battle of Lovcha, or Loftcha (today Lovech), took place during the siege of Plevna. Russian forces successfully reduced the fortress at Lovcha, which had protected Plevna's communication and supply lines. It was a part of the Russo-Turkish War of 1877–1878.

== Battle ==
In July 1877, shortly after the siege of Plevna began, the garrison's commander, Osman Pasha, received 15 battalions of reinforcements from Sofia. He chose to use these reinforcements to fortify Lovcha, which protected his lines of support running from Orchanie (present-day Botevgrad) to Plevna.

After the failure of the first two attempts to storm the city of Plevna, the Russians brought up significant reinforcements, and the investing army now totaled 100,000. Intent on cutting Osman's communications and supply lines, General Alexander Imeretinsky was sent out with 22,703 Russian troops to seize Lovcha.

On 1 September, Generals Alexander Imerentinsky, Mikhail Skobelev, and Vladimir Dobrovolsky reached Lovcha and attacked the city. Fighting continued for the next two days. Osman marched from Plevna to relieve Lovcha, but on 3 September, before he could reach Lovcha, it fell to the Russians. Survivors of the battle withdrew into Plevna and were organized into three battalions. After the loss of Lovcha, these additional troops brought Osman's force up to 30,000, the largest it would be during the siege. The Russians settled on the strategy of a complete investment of Plevna, and with the loss of its major supply route, the fall of Plevna was inevitable.

== See also ==
- Battles of the Russo-Turkish War (1877–78)

== Sources ==
- Compton's Home Library: Battles of the World CD-ROM
- Бръняков Б., Действията около град Ловеч през Освободителната война 1877 -1878 г., Печатница „ Светлина “, Ловеч, 1928 г.
