= 23rd Army Corps (Russian Empire) =

- Country: Russian Empire
- Allegiance: Imperial Russian Army
- Engagements: World War I; Battle of Tannenberg; Battle of Łódź (1914); Battle of the Vistula River

The 23rd Army Corps was an Army corps in the Imperial Russian Army.

== Composition ==
- 3rd Guards Infantry Division
- 2nd Infantry Division

== Part of ==
- 2nd Army: 1914
- 5th Army: 1914 – 1915
- 8th Army: 1915
- 1st Army: 1915
- 13th Army: 1915
- 3rd Army: 1915
- 5th Army: 1916
- 11th Army: 1916
- 8th Army: 1916
- 9th Army: 1916
- 8th Army: 1916 – 1917

== Commanders ==
- August 15, 1913 - August 30, 1914: Kyprian Kandratovich
- August 30 - November 1914: Vladimir Danilov
- December 28, 1914 - July 1, 1915: Vladimir Apollonovich Olokhov
- September 1915: Nikolai Tretyakov
- 1916-1917: Eduard Ekk
- April 1917: Mikhail Promtov
- September 1917: Vasily Kirey
