= Mazagran =

Mazagran may refer to:

== Places ==
- Mazagran, Algeria, an Algerian town in Mostaganem Province
  - Battle of Mazagran, 1840
- Mazagran (Tourcelles-Chaumont), a French village
- Rue de Mazagran, a French street in the 10th arrondissement of Paris

== Other uses ==
- Mazagran (drink), a coffee drink made with lemon juice
- Mazagran (drinkware), a kind of Algerian drinkware usually used for coffee
