= Cavalié Mercer =

English painter

General Cavalié Mercer
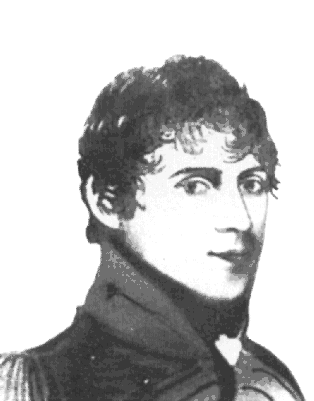
- Born: 28 March 1783; Kingston upon Hull, Yorkshire
- Died: 9 November 1868 (aged 85); Cowley, Devon
- Military career
- Allegiance: United Kingdom
- Branch: British Army
- Service years: 1797–1868
- Rank: General
- Unit: Royal Horse Artillery
- Commands: G Troop RHA; D Troop RHA; Royal Artillery, Nova Scotia; Dover Garrison
- Conflicts: French Revolutionary Wars; Napoleonic Wars; British invasions of the Río de la Plata; Hundred Days; Battle of Quatre Bras; Battle of Waterloo; Aroostook War
- Awards: Waterloo Medal
- Other work: Author and artist

General Alexander Cavalié Mercer (28 March 1783 – 9 November 1868) was a British Army officer of the Royal Horse Artillery. He is most notable as commander of G Troop Royal Horse Artillery at the Battle of Waterloo, and as author of Journal of the Waterloo Campaign.

Mercer's six-gun horse artillery troop arrived too late for the Battle of Quatre Bras, but it fought with the cavalry rearguard covering the army's retreat to Waterloo. The troop fought on the extreme right wing of Wellington's army at Waterloo, before being moved into the thick of the fighting nearer the centre of the line. There it beat off repeated charges by French heavy cavalry, disobeying orders to abandon the guns and retire inside nearby infantry squares as the enemy closed. The location of this action is marked by a memorial on the Waterloo battlefield. After the battle, Mercer's troop marched on Paris with the Allied armies, and formed part of the army of occupation.

Mercer's Journal is an important source for historians of the Waterloo campaign, as well as a detailed description of the landscape and people of Belgium and France in the early 19th century. It is one of the few accounts of the period written by an artillery officer.

Mercer remained in the peacetime army, twice serving in Canada. He was a painter of some merit, and a number of his watercolours of Canadian landscapes were purchased by the National Gallery of Canada in the 1980s.

== Before 1815 ==
Mercer was born in 1783 at Kingston-upon-Hull, Yorkshire, into a military family: his father was General Alexander Mercer of the Royal Engineers. The name Cavaillie was possibly inherited from his grandmother Margaret Cavaillie, wife of James Mercer overseer at Fort George. Margaret Cavaillie (1699, St Andrews – 1777, St Andrews) was the daughter of captain James Cavaillie, who it is said came to Britain in the army of William of Orange and settled in Fife as a wine merchant and died at Cupar Fife in 1716. He went to the Military Academy at Woolwich and was commissioned as a lieutenant in the Royal Regiment of Artillery in 1799 at the age of 16. He served in Ireland in the aftermath of the Irish Rebellion of 1798. He was promoted to second captain (a rank unique to the Ordnance) in 1806. Promotion in the Royal Artillery was very slow, especially in peacetime, as it relied solely on seniority. Unlike in the rest of the British Army of the time there was no opportunity for purchase of commissions in the Ordnance. Mercer was not breveted as a major until 1 March 1824, though this was then backdated to 12 August 1819.

Mercer was posted to G Troop Royal Horse Artillery around 1806 and joined Whitelocke's ill-fated Buenos Aires expedition in 1807. He did not serve in the Peninsular War and next saw war service in the Waterloo Campaign.

== G Troop ==
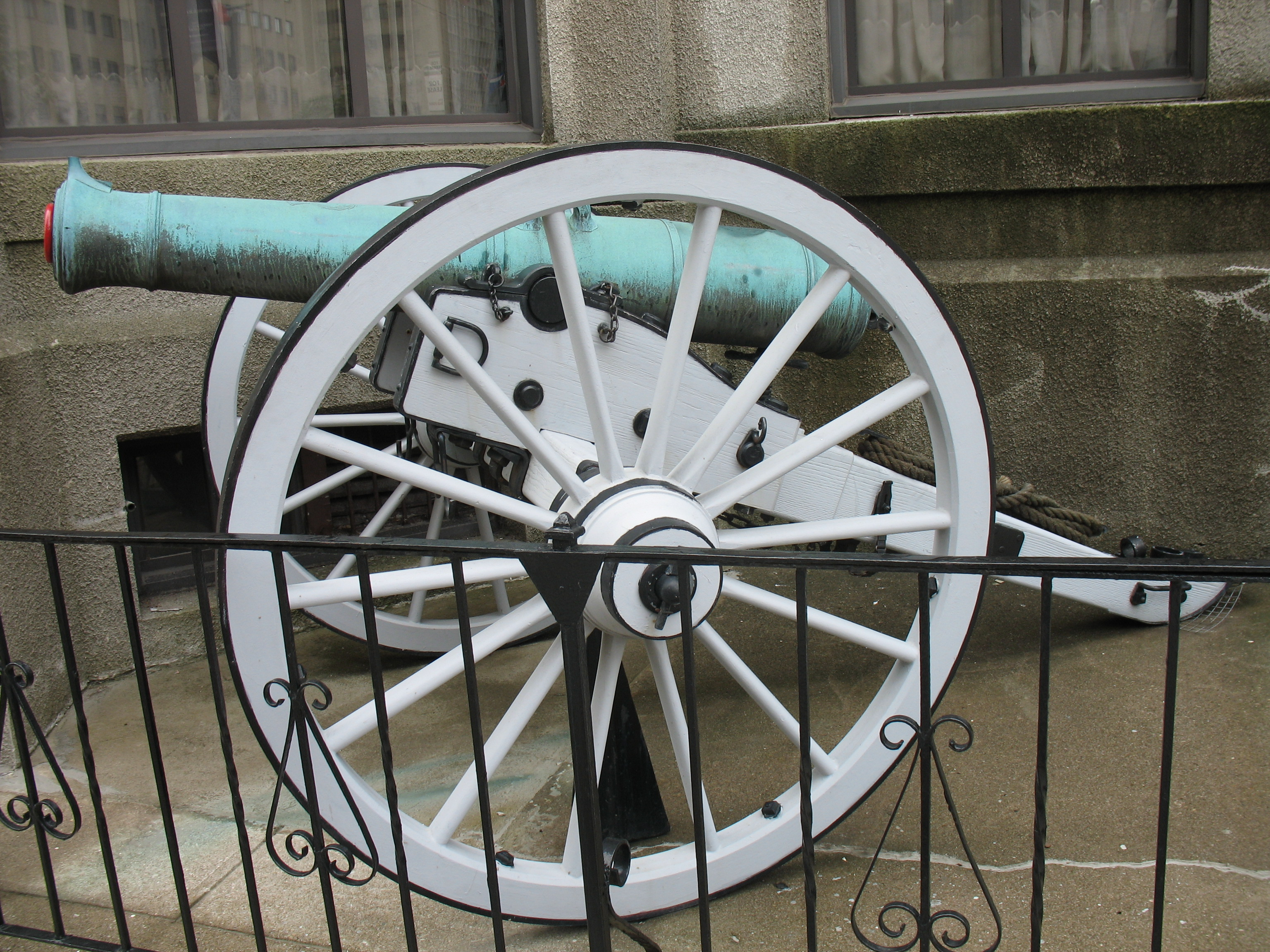
A 9-pounder gun of 1813–1815.

In 1815 Mercer was acting commander of what was officially G (Dickson's) Troop, Royal Horse Artillery, but is usually referred to as Mercer's Troop or Mercer's Battery. Its modern successor is G Parachute Battery (Mercer's Troop) Royal Horse Artillery, part of 7th Parachute Regiment Royal Horse Artillery, which currently serves in the field artillery role with 16 Air Assault Brigade, and is equipped with the L118 Light Gun.

G Troop served on the 1807 Buenos Aires expedition, but the G Troop of Waterloo was formed from the amalgamation of two other RHA troops before leaving Colchester for Belgium. It had the pick of the horses from each, and was therefore regarded as an exceptionally fine unit. When reviewing the cavalry at Grammont on 29 May 1815, Blücher is supposed to have said "there is not one horse in this battery that is not fit for a field marshal". The troop had five 9-pounder guns (which had recently replaced some of the RHA's 6-pounders) and a 5½" howitzer, 80 gunners, 86 drivers and 226 horses.

== Waterloo Campaign ==
Mercer's Troop embarked for Belgium on 11 April 1815, a few days after hearing of Napoleon's escape from Elba. From 1 May until the French invasion on 15 June it led a quiet life in the small village of Strijtem, west of Brussels. G Troop rode all day on 16 June, but arrived too late to participate in the Battle of Quatre Bras. It covered the retreat from Quatre Bras on 17 June, narrowly escaping capture by French cavalry. It was in the action at Genappe later the same day with the cavalry rearguard.

Arriving on the field of Waterloo, Mercer's Troop briefly took up a firing position on the famous knoll behind the sandpit, which would feature in the fighting the following day. Mercer was still acting as rearguard for Wellington's army, not realising that the entire army had halted on the ridge immediately behind him. His troop exchanged fire with arriving French batteries before retiring.

After a miserable, hungry night in the mud and rain in the orchard of Mont St Jean farm, where Mercer is fabled to have drunk port from a chicken shaped goblet, Mercer found himself without orders in the opening phase of the battle, as d'Erlon's infantry attacked Wellington's left. He was about to lead his troop into action on his own initiative when he was ordered to the extreme right of the line. That was a quiet sector, but in common with much of Wellington's artillery, Mercer disobeyed orders to refrain from counter-battery fire. He engaged enemy guns, attracting heavy fire from superior enemy artillery in return.

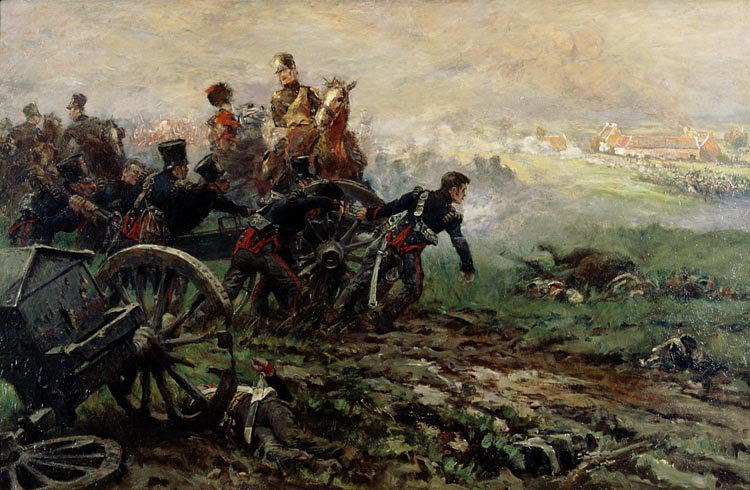
Krahmer's Dutch-Belgian horse artillery battery at Waterloo. Mercer's Troop was on the same section of the ridge in the picture.

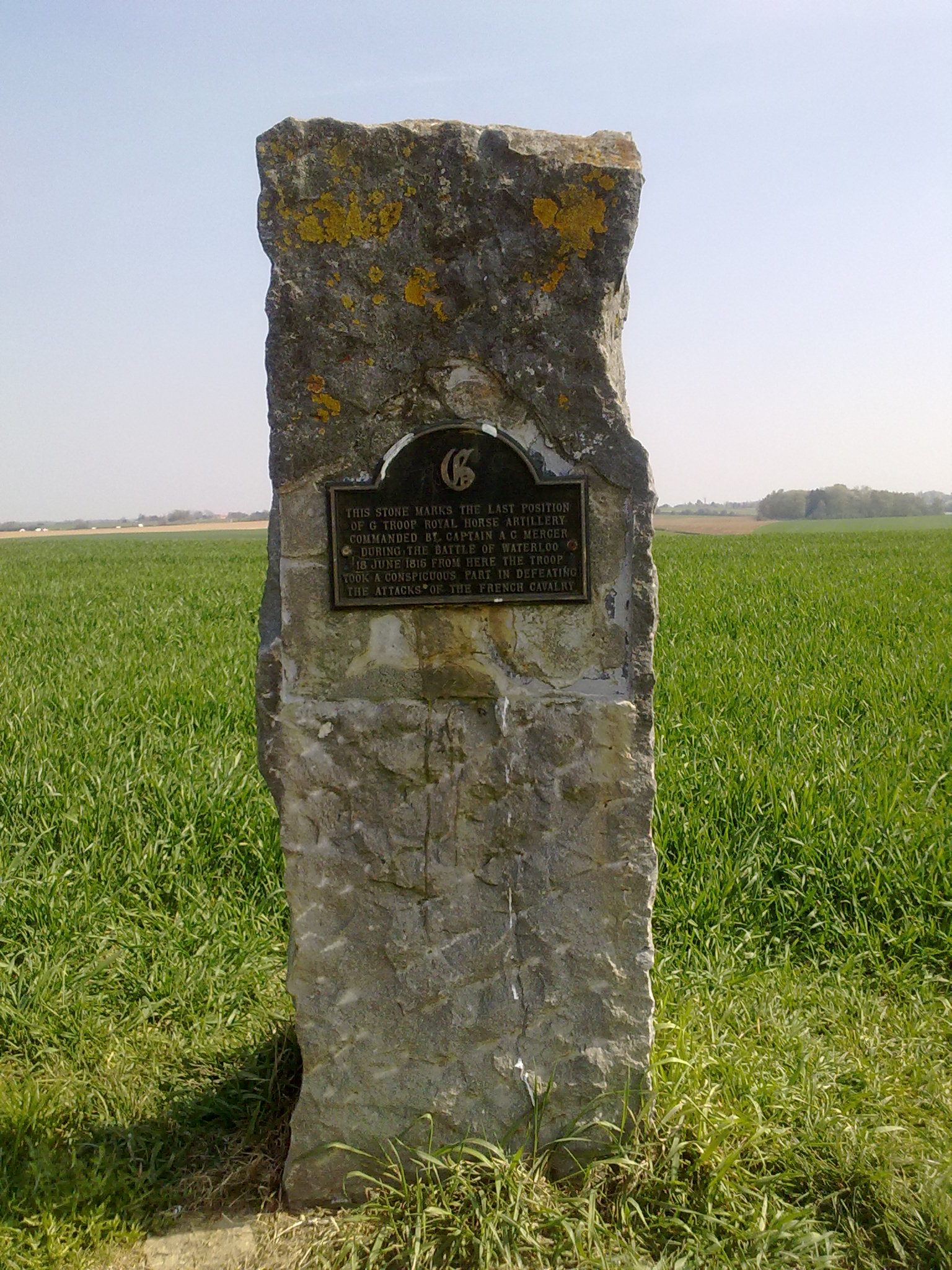
The memorial stone marking the position on the Waterloo battlefield where Mercer's troop fought French cavalry.

In mid-afternoon Mercer's Troop was suddenly ordered into the hottest part of Wellingtons' line, between the crossroads and Hougoumont, where its position is now marked by a memorial. It deployed immediately behind the ridge road, which was on a low embankment. The bank provided excellent cover from enemy artillery and increased the effectiveness of Mercer's case-shot. The troop was between two squares of Brunswick infantry, whom Mercer regarded as unsteady. He was ordered to lead his men into the squares as cavalry closed, but decided they would be safer at their guns. Unlike all the other batteries in the sector, the troop's gunners never abandoned their guns to take refuge in the infantry squares.

Massed French heavy cavalry attacked repeatedly from about 3.15 pm. The Grenadiers à Cheval of the Imperial Guard were already emerging through the smoke at the trot as Mercer's guns deployed, so the troop opened fire with case-shot at close range, causing terrible casualties. The French hesitated, then the front ranks attempted to retreat as the rear ranks pushed forward, causing them to mill about under the execution of Mercer's guns before they eventually withdrew.

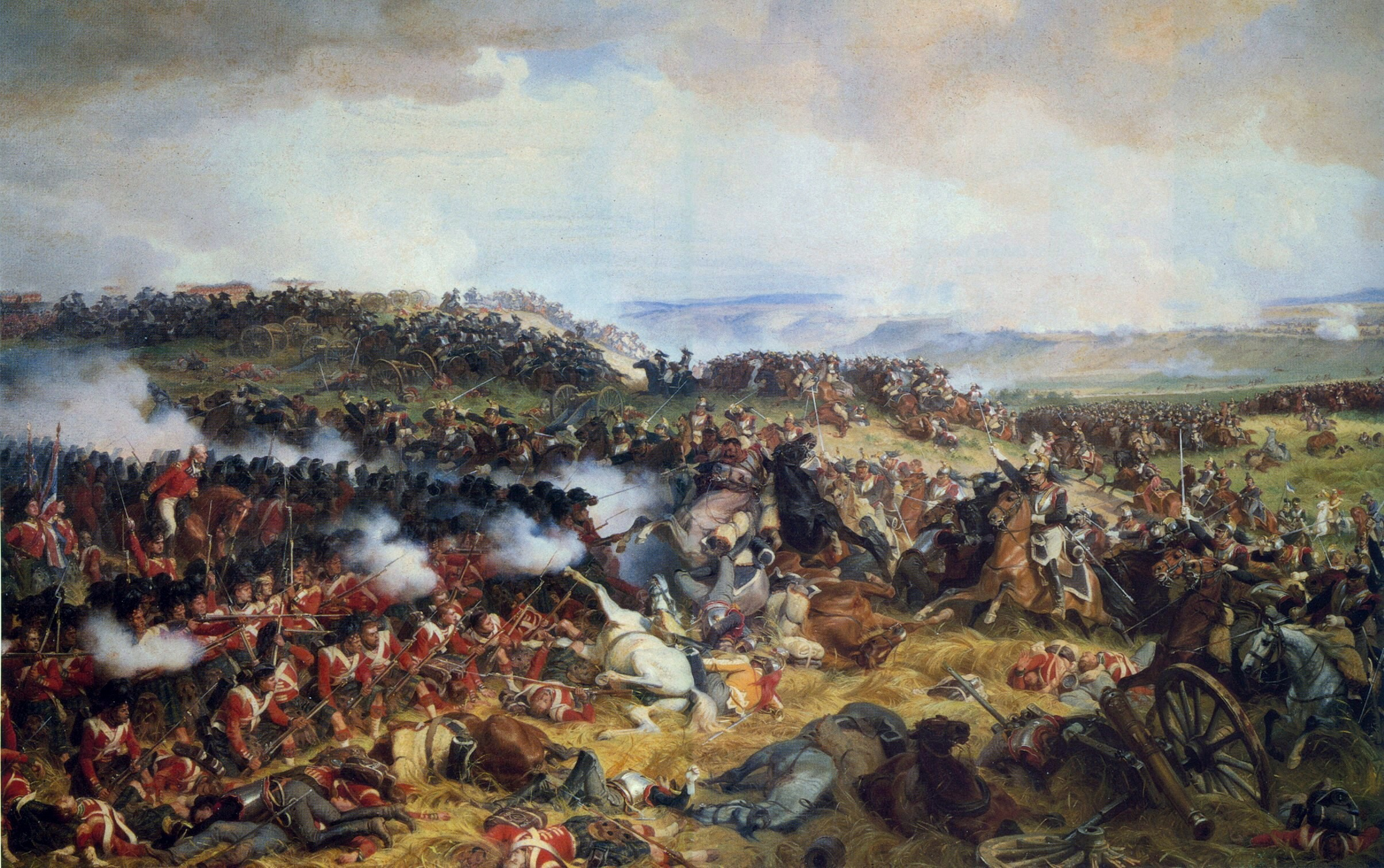
Charge of the French Cuirassiers at Waterloo, painting by Félix Philippoteaux (1815–1884).

Before the second charge of the heavy cavalry, Mercer's Troop was harassed by close-range carbine fire from mounted French skirmishers, while Mercer held fire to conserve ammunition. To steady his men, Mercer promenaded across his troop's front on horseback, goading the enemy in French and attracting aimed but inaccurate carbine-fire in return.

The second main attack came on in columns, led by cuirassiers. Mercer's Troop waited for them, double-loaded with case-shot over ball, and fired at 50 or 60 yards. Mercer reported that the whole front rank of the enemy went down, with the round-shot tearing through the column behind. The ground became virtually impassable with dead and wounded horses and men, so the enemy could not close the gun-line. Under the rapid fire of Mercer's Troop and the Brunswick infantry, the enemy fell like "grass before the mower's scythe". The greatest danger to Mercer's men came between the charges, from French skirmishers and artillery.

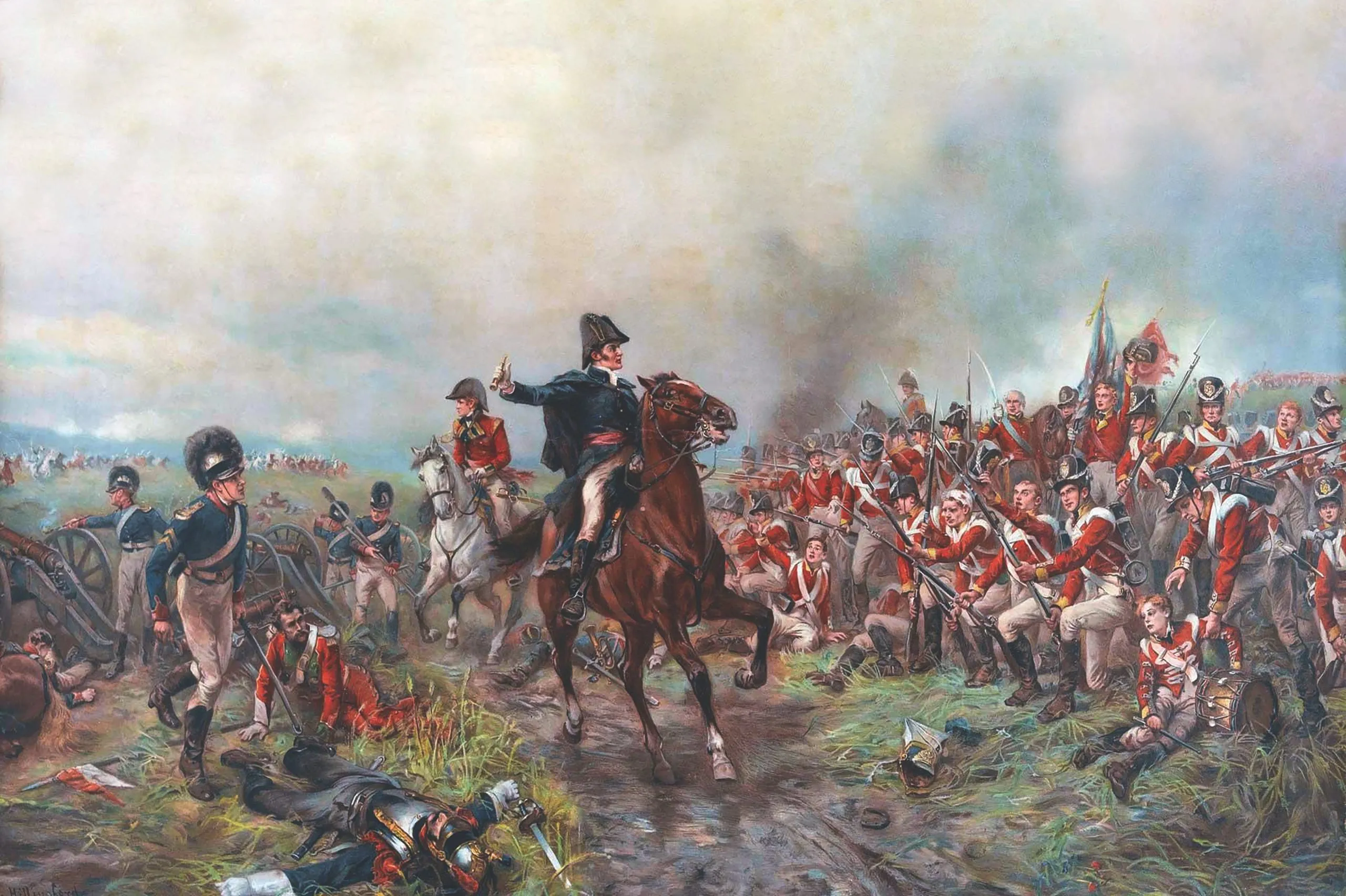
Wellington at Waterloo painting by Robert Alexander Hillingford showing Royal Horse Artillery on the left.

The third and final charge stood little chance of reaching the guns. On each occasion individual cavalrymen passed between the guns, but only so as to escape to the British rear. As the third attack withdrew, the troop had to cease firing to allow the Duke of Wellington to pass along the road. Shortly afterwards Wellington's infantry advanced, leaving the guns on the ridge to engage masses of French troops in the valley below.

Towards the end of the action a battery established itself on the ridge to Mercer's left and fired into the flank of his troop, causing devastating casualties amongst the limber-horses. This battery was eventually driven off by fire from a newly arrived Belgian battery. The hostile battery may well have been Prussian but Mercer did not believe it, despite being told so by a Brunswick cavalry officer.

Due to its shortage of horses, the troop was unable to move when the general advance was ordered, and Mercer slept under a limber, amongst the dead and wounded.

The troop had 5 killed and 15 wounded and lost 69 horses at Waterloo. It expended 700 rounds of ammunition. Sir Augustus Frazer said, "I could plainly distinguish the position of G Troop from the opposite height by the dark mass of dead French cavalry which, even at that distance, formed a remarkable feature on the field."

== After Waterloo ==
Mercer's Troop stayed on the battlefield until 3 pm the following day, and Mercer spent the day touring the field, visiting Hougoumont and talking to the wounded. Once it had been rejoined by its ammunition and supply wagons, the troop moved off towards Nivelles, leaving some guns and carriages behind for lack of horses. It rejoined the Army near Mons on 21 June, and marched with it to the gates of Paris without seeing further action. It was ordered into cantonments at Colombes early in July 1815. Apart from two months of leave in England, Mercer spent much of the rest of the year enjoying tourist pursuits in Paris. Mercer was transferred to command D Troop RHA at Stains, also near Paris, in July 1815 and he returned with it to England in January 1816.

After the campaign Mercer was put on half-pay from 31 July 1816 until 1821. Recalled to the peacetime army, he served twice in British North America, first as commander of the 6th company of the 5th battalion Royal Artillery at Quebec from 1823. He was breveted major in 1824, backdated to 1819. He returned to England in 1829 and held commands at Woolwich and Devonport. He was promoted lieutenant-colonel on 5 June 1835. He served again in British North America from 1837 to 1842, commanding the artillery in Nova Scotia during the 1837 border dispute with the United States which became known as the Aroostook War. He was promoted to colonel on 2 April 1846, to major-general on 20 June 1854 and to lieutenant-general on 29 August 1857. He was commandant of the Dover garrison before he retired from active service, but he was appointed Colonel Commandant 9 Brigade Royal Artillery on 16 January 1859, and as such he was never officially placed on the retired list. He was promoted to full general on 9 February 1865.

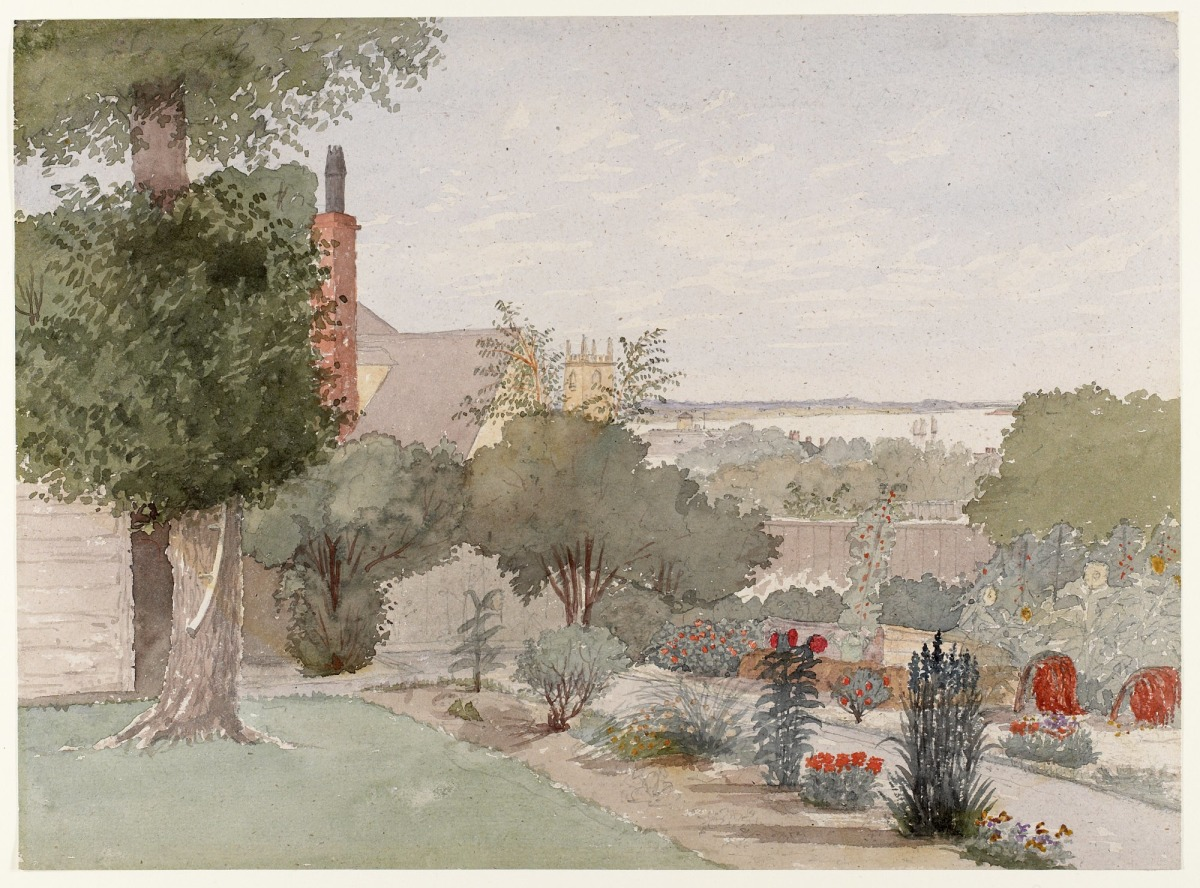
Artillery Park, Halifax (1842) by Mercer. Watercolour in the National Gallery of Canada.

During his service in Lower Canada (1828–29) and Nova Scotia (1840–42) Mercer painted the watercolours which were acquired by the National Gallery of Canada in the 1980s.

In 2014, Glenn Devanney of Halifax, Nova Scotia, Canada wrote a book titled "Halifax in Watercolour: The Paintings of Alexander Cavalié Mercer 1838–1842." The ninety-six page book includes historical text and fifty-two paintings.

Mercer married Frances (or Fanny) Rice on 10 November 1813 at Bourton on the Water, Gloucestershire, while he was stationed in Woodbridge, Suffolk; she travelled with him to France after his leave in November 1815. They had one son, Cavalié A. Mercer, who edited the Journal after his father's death. Mercer and Fanny lived in Berkshire at the time of the Waterloo campaign, but in later life Mercer lived at Cowley Hill near Exeter. He died there on 9 November 1868 and is buried at St. David's Church, Exeter.

Today a publicly funded project is underway to restore Mercer's grave for the Waterloo 200th commemorations, to provide informative signage and to build a fund to care for the condition of the grave for the next 100 years. The commemorations will be marked on 18 June 2015 at Mercer's graveside with a short service, the laying of a laurel and rose wreath, and the respect of current serving members of Mercer's G Troop.

== Journal ==
His Journal of the Waterloo Campaign kept throughout the campaign of 1815 was published in 1870, after his death. It was written some 30 years earlier, from the original notes Mercer wrote contemporaneously, with additions and verifications from correspondence and other sources. It covers the period from April 1815 to January 1816, when Mercer returned to Canterbury with D Troop, with an interlude for his leave in England from September to November 1815. By Mercer's own admission he had little time to write his journal in the hectic few days before and after Waterloo, so his account may not be entirely reliable. The Journal is notable for its lengthy descriptions of the countryside and its people, and especially of Parisian life under the Allied occupation. Very little of it is devoted to military matters, and indeed Mercer does not seem to have devoted much time to command, spending most of his days in country walks, riding or tourism in Paris.
