= The Arrival of La Dorade at Courbevoie =

Painting by Henri Félix Emmanuel Philippoteaux

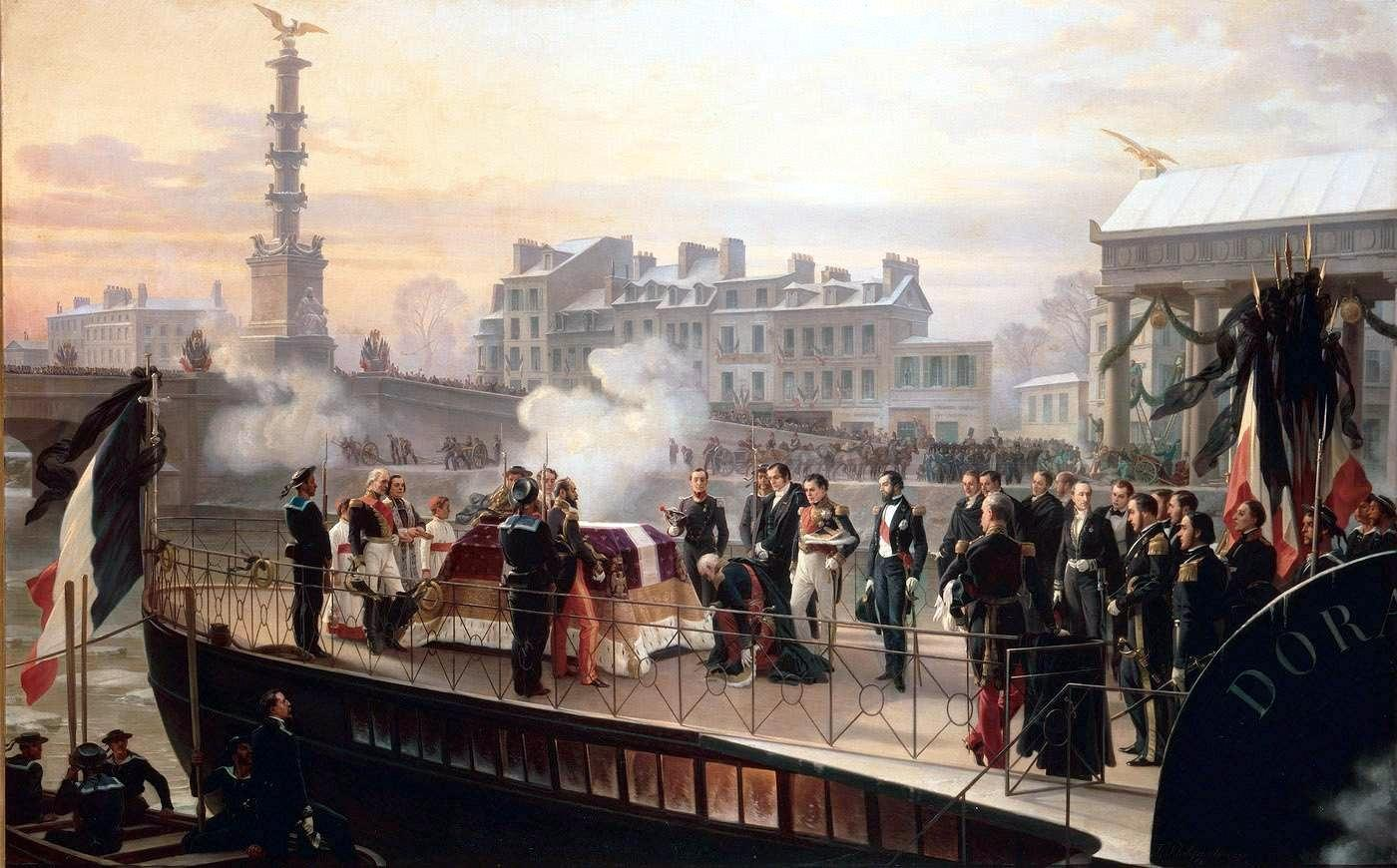
- Artist: Henri Félix Emmanuel Philippoteaux.
- Year: 1867
- Type: Oil on canvas, history painting
- Dimensions: 125 cm × 200 cm (49 in × 79 in)
- Location: Château de Malmaison, Paris

The Arrival of La Dorade at Courbevoie (French: L'arrivée de La Dorade à Courbevoie) is an oil on canvas history painting by the French artist Henri Félix Emmanuel Philippoteaux, from 1867.

== History and description ==
It depicts a scene on 14 December 1840 during the ceremonial return of the remains of Napoleon to France. After his final defeat at the Battle of Waterloo, Napoleon had been exiled to the island of Saint Helena in British custody where he died in 1821. In 1840 the July Monarchy of Louis Philippe I arranged with the British for his remains to be repatriated to France. The painting shows the moment the ferry La Dorade reached Courbevoie in Paris, before the coffin was borne through the streets.

Philippoteaux was a celebrated history painter who had produced notable battle scenes from Napoleon's career such as The Battle of Rivoli for the Galerie des Batailles at the Palace of Versailles.

The picture was exhibited at the Salon of 1867. Today the painting is in the Château de Malmaison, on the outskirts of Paris, having been acquired in 1928.

== Bibliography ==
- Lentz, Thierry Discoveries: Napoleon: "My Ambition Was Great". Harry N. Abrams, 2005.
- Martin, Roger. La peinture napoléonienne après l'Empire. Teissèdre, 2006.
