= Mazagran (drink) =

Coffee drink made with lemon juice

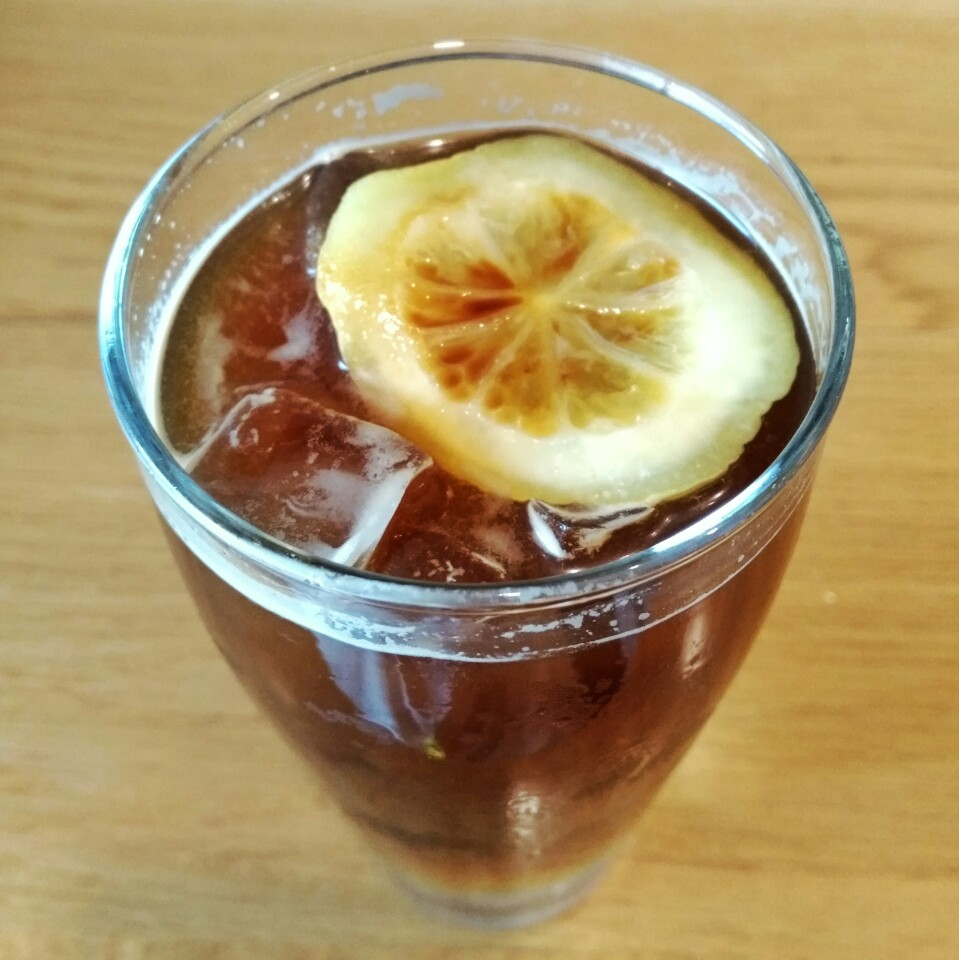
- Mazagran
- Alternative names: Café mazagran Masagran
- Type: Beverage
- Place of origin: Algeria
- Serving temperature: Hot or Cold
- Main ingredients: Coffee, water

Mazagran (also called café mazagran, formerly spelt masagran) is a cold, sweetened coffee drink that originated in Algeria. Portuguese versions may use espresso, lemon, mint and rum, and Austrian versions are served with an ice cube and include rum or maraschino. Sometimes a fast version is achieved by pouring a previously sweetened espresso in a cup with ice cubes and a slice of lemon. Mazagran has been described as "the original iced coffee".

== History and origin ==
It has been stated that the drink's name probably originated from a fortress named Mazagran in a coastal town called Mostaganem in the northwest of Algeria which in 1837 through the Treaty of Tafna was granted to France. At the Mazagran fortress French colonial troops consumed the beverage, which was prepared with coffee syrup and cold water. It has also been stated that the drink's name and invention may have originated from French Foreign Legion soldiers who, during the time of the siege of Mazagran, Algeria during the 1840 war, used water in their coffee in the absence of milk or brandy and drank the beverage cold to counter the heat. Furthermore, French colonial troops near Mazagran were served a beverage prepared with coffee syrup and water. When the soldiers returned to Paris, they suggested to cafés to serve the beverage and the notion of it being served in tall glasses. Upon this introduction, the beverage was named café mazagran. In France, coffee served in glasses is referred to as "mazagrin".

== Preparation and varieties ==
Mazagran is prepared with strong, hot coffee that is poured over ice, and it is typically served in a narrow, tall glass. It has also been described as "coffee taken with water instead of milk", in which coffee is served in a tall glass along with a separate container of water to mix in with the coffee.

The beverage has also been described as sweetened "Portuguese iced coffee" that is prepared with strong coffee or espresso served over ice with lemon. Sometimes rum is added to Portuguese versions of the drink, and it may be sweetened with sugar syrup.

In Austria, mazagran coffee is served with an ice cube and prepared with rum or maraschino. The beverage is typically downed "in one gulp".

In Catalonia and Valencia, it is made with coffee added to ice, and a lemon peel. It is called "Café del temps" (Cat.), "café del tiempo" (Spa.), or "weather's coffee".

In the mid-1990s, Starbucks and PepsiCo developed a line of flavoured carbonated mazagran beverages named "Mazagran" that were prepared with coffee. After a short trial run in California in 1994, the drink was discontinued after failing to catch on with consumers. A useful new by-product of Starbucks' research and development of mazagran was a coffee extract that could be used in various coffee-flavoured products. The coffee extract was later used in the preparation of pre-mixed, bottled Starbucks' frappuccino drinks that are sold in grocery stores. The extract is also used in the company's bottled double shot and iced coffee drinks.

== See also ==
- List of coffee drinks
- Mazagran – a type of drinkware usually used for coffee
