= The Defence of Mazagran =

Painting by Henri Félix Emmanuel Philippoteaux

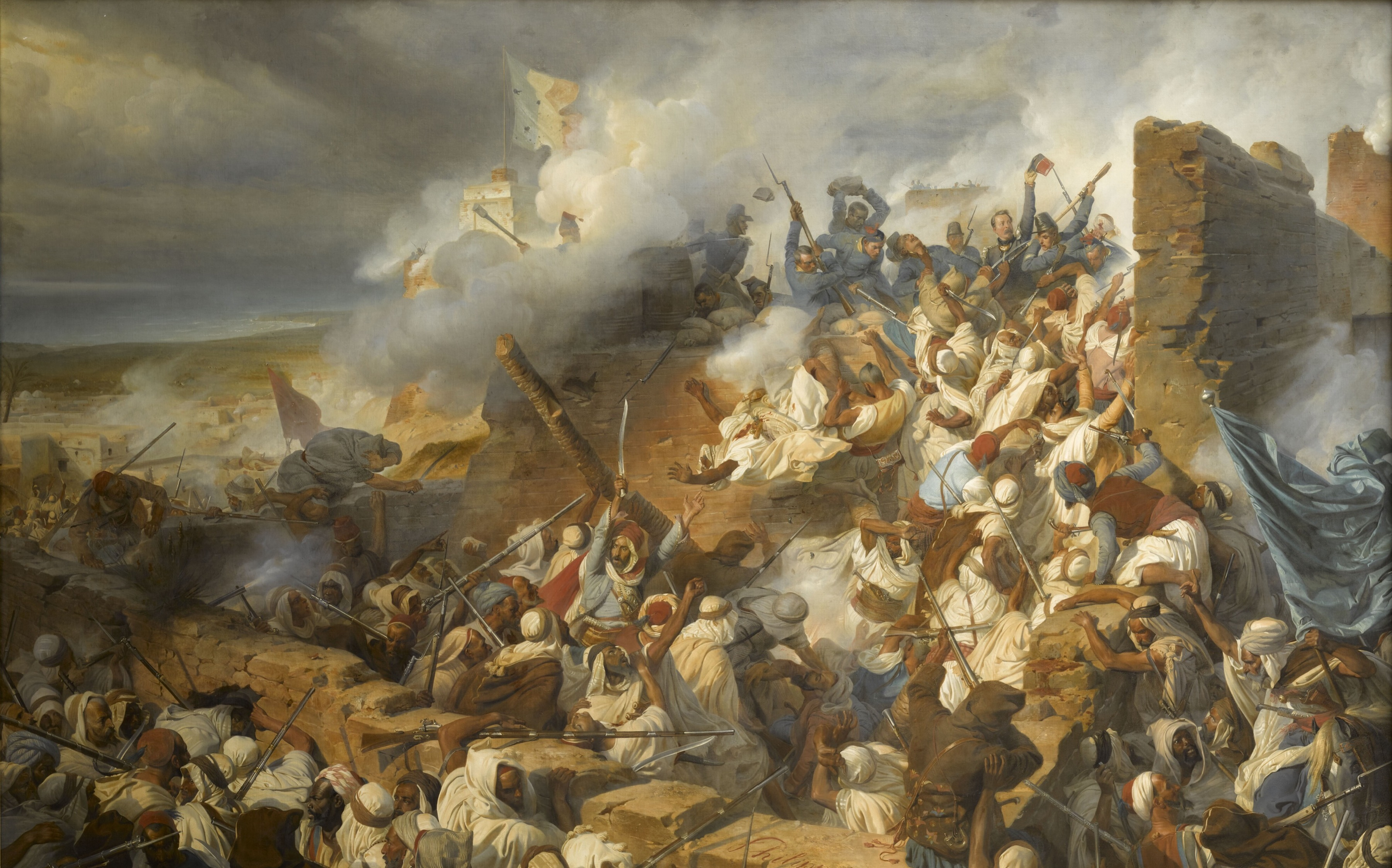
- Artist: Henri Félix Emmanuel Philippoteaux
- Year: 1841
- Type: Oil on canvas, history painting
- Dimensions: 270 cm × 420 cm (110 in × 170 in)
- Location: Palace of Versailles, Versailles

The Defence of Mazagran (French: Defense of Mazagran) is an oil on canvas history painting by the French artist Henri Félix Emmanuel Philippoteaux, from 1841.

== History and description ==
It depicts a scene from the French conquest of Algeria. During the Battle of Mazagran on 6 February 1840, a small force of French soldiers repulsed an assault led by Mustapha Ben Tami on the towns walls of Mazagran. The heroic resistance of a vastly outnumbered force, draws parallels with the Spartans at Battle of Thermopylae.

Stylistically it reflects the fashionable Romanticism of the period. The painting was commissioned by the Ministry of War. It was displayed at the Salon of 1842 held at the Louvre in Paris. Today it is in the collection of the Musée de l'Histoire de France at the Palace of Versailles.

== Bibliography ==
- Duong, Kevin. The Virtues of Violence: Democracy Against Disintegration in Modern France. Oxford University Press, 2020.
- Hornstein, Katie. Picturing War in France, 1792–1856. Yale University Press, 2018.
- Sessions, Jennifer E. By Sword and Plow: France and the Conquest of Algeria. Cornell University Press, 2015.
