= Mazagran (drinkware) =

Type of drinkware

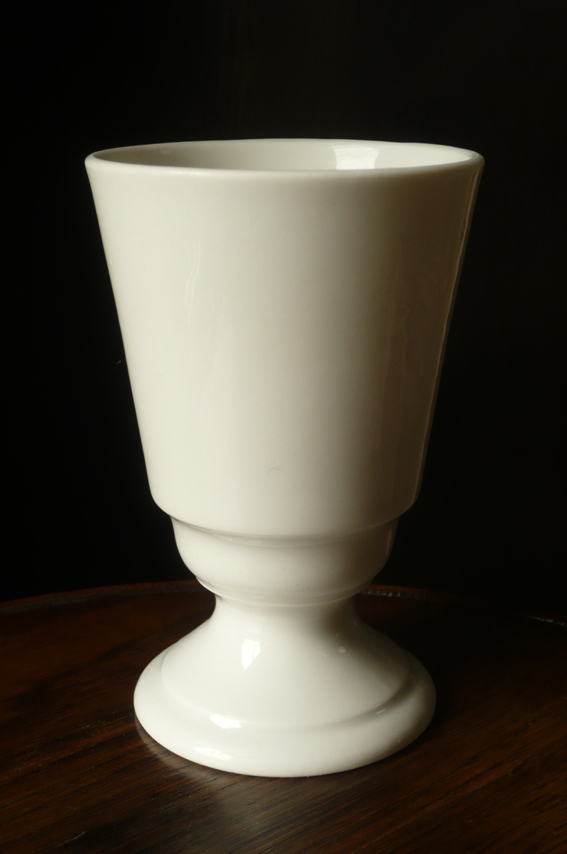
Earthenware Mazagran

Mazagran is a type of cup usually used for coffee, which is named after the town of Mazagran in Algeria. It is unusual in coffee cup styles in having a short stem, and typically no handle or saucer. It has been most popular in France. Iced coffee drinks in a variety of recipes, some alcoholic, are also called mazagran; they may or may not be served in Mazagran cups.

It is a glass or cup on a foot, optionally also with a handle or a short stem. Mazagrans can be made of terracotta, porcelain or glass.

The Battle of Mazagran took place there in 1840 between French soldiers and Algerians and a legend claims that during the night, the besieged French soldiers drank coffee laced with alcoholic beverages. The battle, where 123 French soldiers under Captain Lelièvre successfully defended their post against a vastly superior force, became an immediate cultural phenomenon in France. Frustrated by military stagnation elsewhere, the French public and press elevated the defense to mythical status, celebrating the soldiers as "models of valor" comparable to the heroes of the Napoleonic Wars. This patriotic fervor generated a "flood of imagery" including lithographs, songs, and plays, and launched a wave of "mazagran" branded merchandise that included pantaloons, hats, shawls, and decorative liquor labels.

== Sources ==
- Sessions, Jennifer E. (2011). By Sword and Plow: France and the Conquest of Algeria. Ithaca: Cornell University Press. ISBN 978-0-8014-4975-8.
