= Lamartine Rejecting the Red Flag in Front of the City Hall =

Painting by Henri Félix Emmanuel Philippoteaux

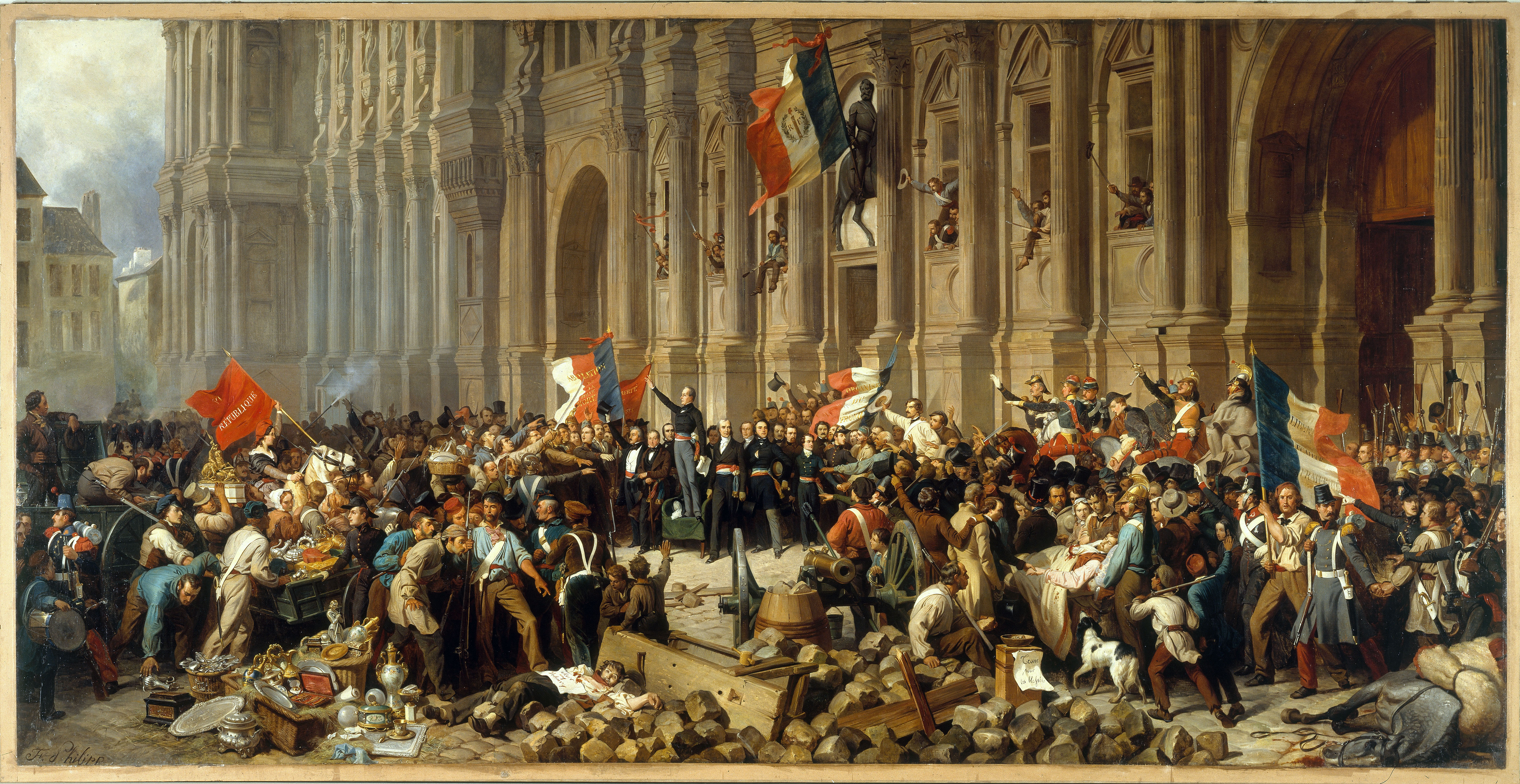
- Artist: Henri Félix Emmanuel Philippoteaux
- Year: c. 1848
- Type: Oil on canvas, history painting
- Dimensions: 298 cm × 629 cm (117 in × 248 in)
- Location: Musée Carnavalet, Paris

Lamartine Rejecting the Red Flag in Front of the City Hall (French: Lamartine refusant le drapeau rouge devant l'Hôtel de Ville) is an oil on canvas history painting by the French artist Henri Félix Emmanuel Philippoteaux, from c. 1848. It is held at the Musée Carnavalet, in Paris.

== History and description ==
It depicts a key moment in the French Revolution of 1848, when following the overthrow of the July Monarchy of Louis Philippe I, a provisional government gathered at the City Hall of Paris. The Romantic writer and politician Alphonse de Lamartine was a key figure in the new government and formally proclaimed the French Second Republic. Lamartine is shown standing on a chair with the provisional administration behind him, amidst the remnants of the earlier fighting. The crowd contains many soldiers and National Guardsman.

Revolutionary insurgents carried the Red flag which they wanted to be adopted, but Lamartine rejected this in favour of the traditional French Tricolour, which remained the national flag during the Second Republic. The proffered red flag is carried by an allegorical woman on horseback wearing a Phrygian cap. Today the painting is part of the collection of the Musée Carnavalet, in Paris, having been acquired in 1901.

== Bibliography ==
- Clark, Christopher. Revolutionary Spring: Europe Aflame and the Fight for a New World, 1848-1849. Crown, 2024.
