= Mazagran (Tourcelles-Chaumont) =

- Village
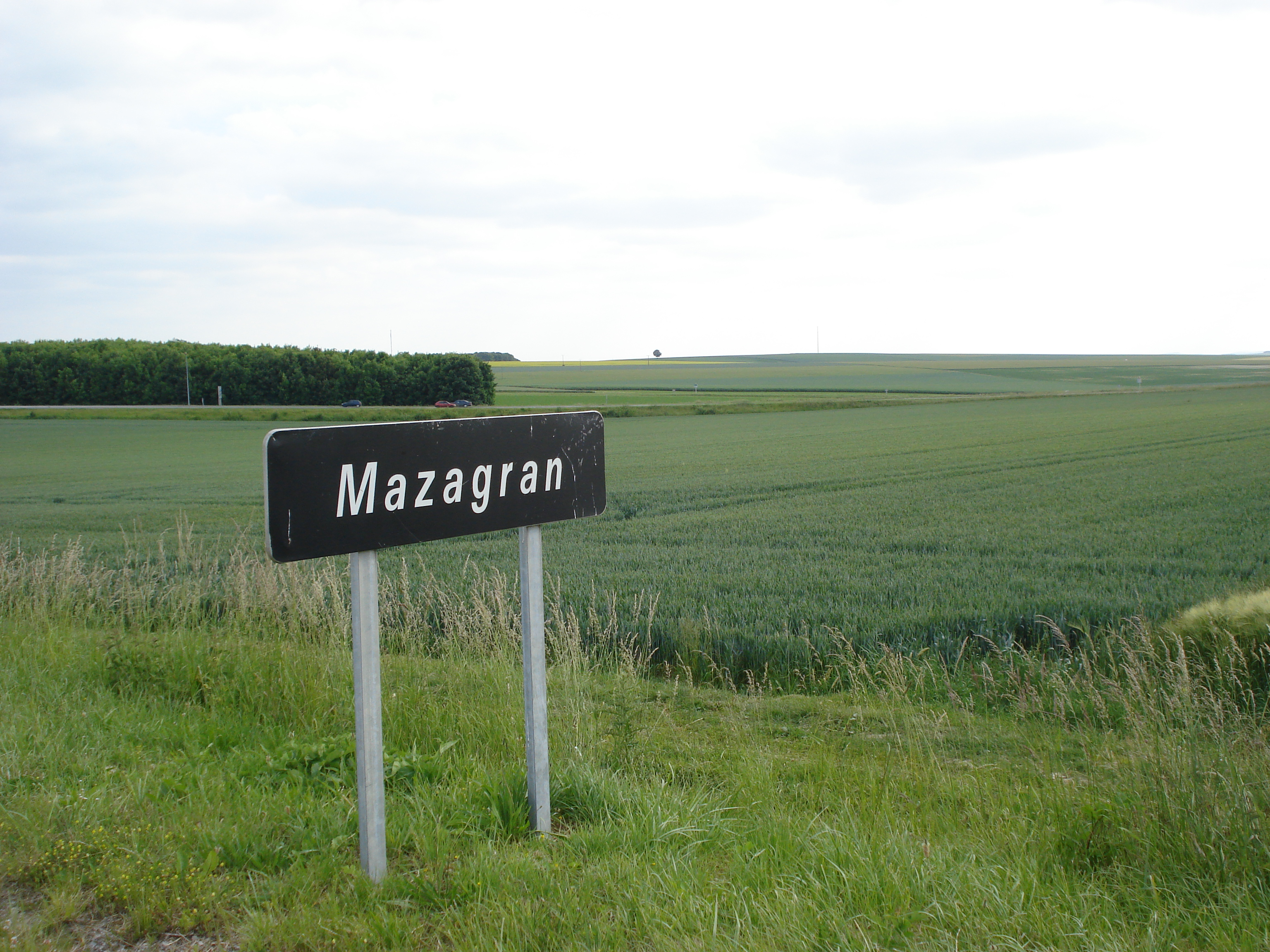
- Signboard at village's entrance

- Locator map of Mazagran in France
- Coordinates: 49°23′35.76″N 4°35′5.8″E
- Country: France
- Region: Grand Est
- Department: Ardennes
- Arrondissement: Vouziers
- Canton: Machault
- Municipality: Tourcelles-Chaumont
- Elevation: 100 m (330 ft)
- Time zone: UTC+1 (CET)
  - Summer (DST): UTC+2 (CEST)
- Postal code: 08400
- Area code: (+33) ...

Mazagran (French pronunciation: [mazaɡʁɑ̃]) is a French village, part of the municipality (commune) of Tourcelles-Chaumont, in the department of Ardennes, Grand Est.

== History ==
The locality was named after a battle holed up in 1840 in the Algerian town of Mazagran; between Algerian resistance forces and French troops, during the French conquest of Algeria.

== Geography ==
Situated in an agricultural plateau few km from Tourcelles-Chaumont and Leffincourt; it has a central roundabout that is a junction point of several national roads to Reims, Vouziers, Châlons-en-Champagne, Rethel and Charleville-Mézières. The proper village is composed by few and scattered farms.

== Literature ==
The French writer André Dhôtel set his 1947 novel "Le Plateau de Mazagran" in the village.
