= Tourcelles-Chaumont =

- Commune
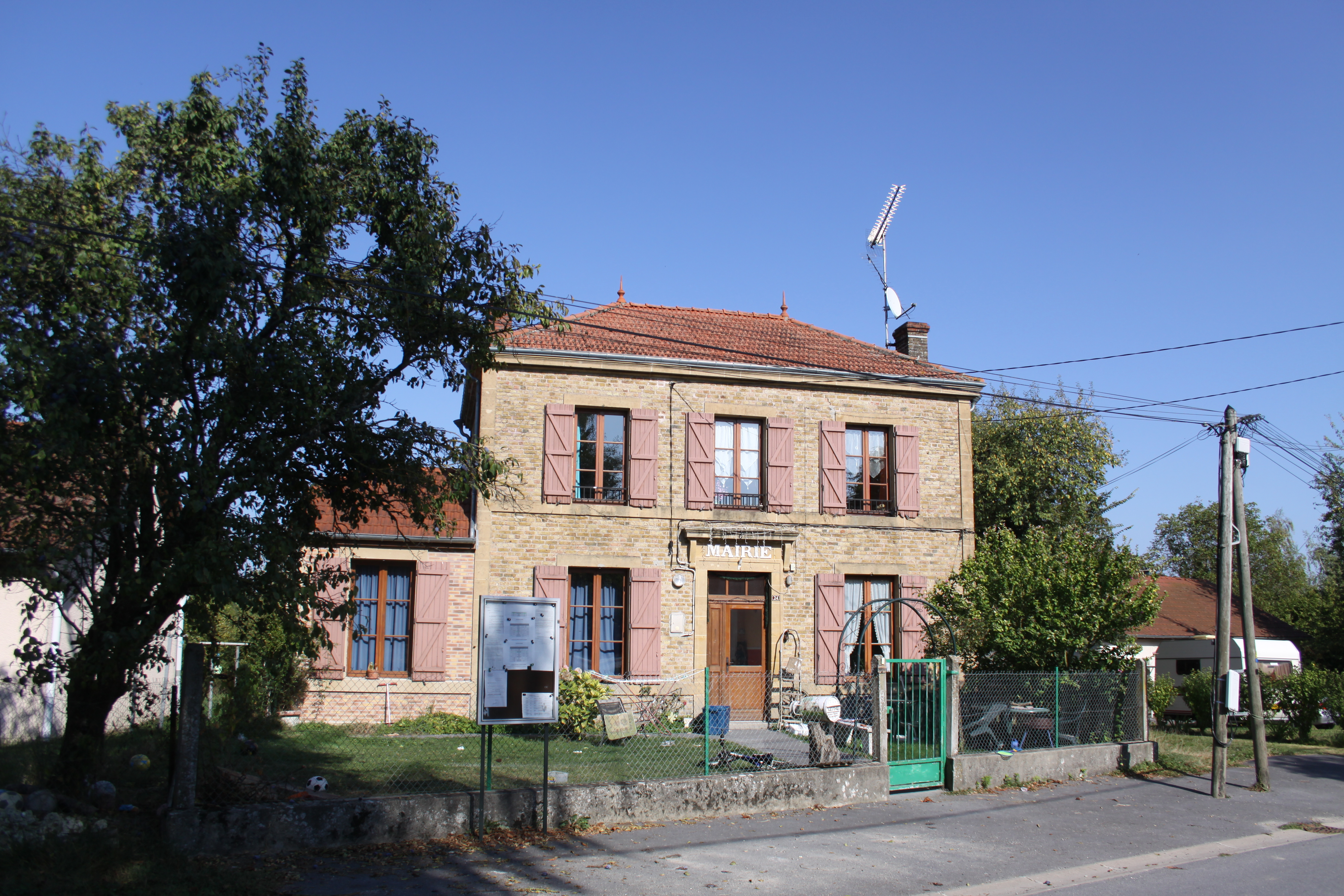
- Town hall

- Coat of arms
- Location of Tourcelles-Chaumont
- Location within France Location within Grand Est
- Coordinates: 49°24′06″N 4°36′16″E
- Country: France
- Region: Grand Est
- Department: Ardennes
- Arrondissement: Vouziers
- Canton: Attigny
- Intercommunality: Argonne Ardennaise

Government
  - Mayor (2020–2026): Jacques Grosselin
- Area^{1}: 4.81 km^{2} (1.86 sq mi)
- Elevation: 117 m (384 ft)
- Highest elevation: 181 m (594 ft)
- Lowest elevation: 98 m (322 ft)
- Population (2023): 84
  - Density: 17/km^{2} (45/sq mi)
- Time zone: UTC+01:00 (CET)
  - Summer (DST): UTC+02:00 (CEST)
- INSEE/Postal code: 08455 /08400
- ^{1} French Land Register data, which excludes lakes, ponds, glaciers > 1 km^{2} (0.386 sq mi or 247 acres) and river estuaries.

Tourcelles-Chaumont (French pronunciation: [tuʁsɛl ʃomɔ̃]) is a commune in the Ardennes department in northern France.

== Population ==
Historical population
Year	Pop.	±% p.a.
1968	67	—
1975	52	−3.56%
1982	44	−2.36%
1990	54	+2.59%
1999	73	+3.41%
2007	94	+3.21%
2012	94	+0.00%
2017	92	−0.43%
2023	84	−1.50%
Source: INSEE

== See also ==
- Mazagran
- Communes of the Ardennes department
