= The Last Banquet of the Girondins =

Painting by Henri Félix Emmanuel Philippoteaux

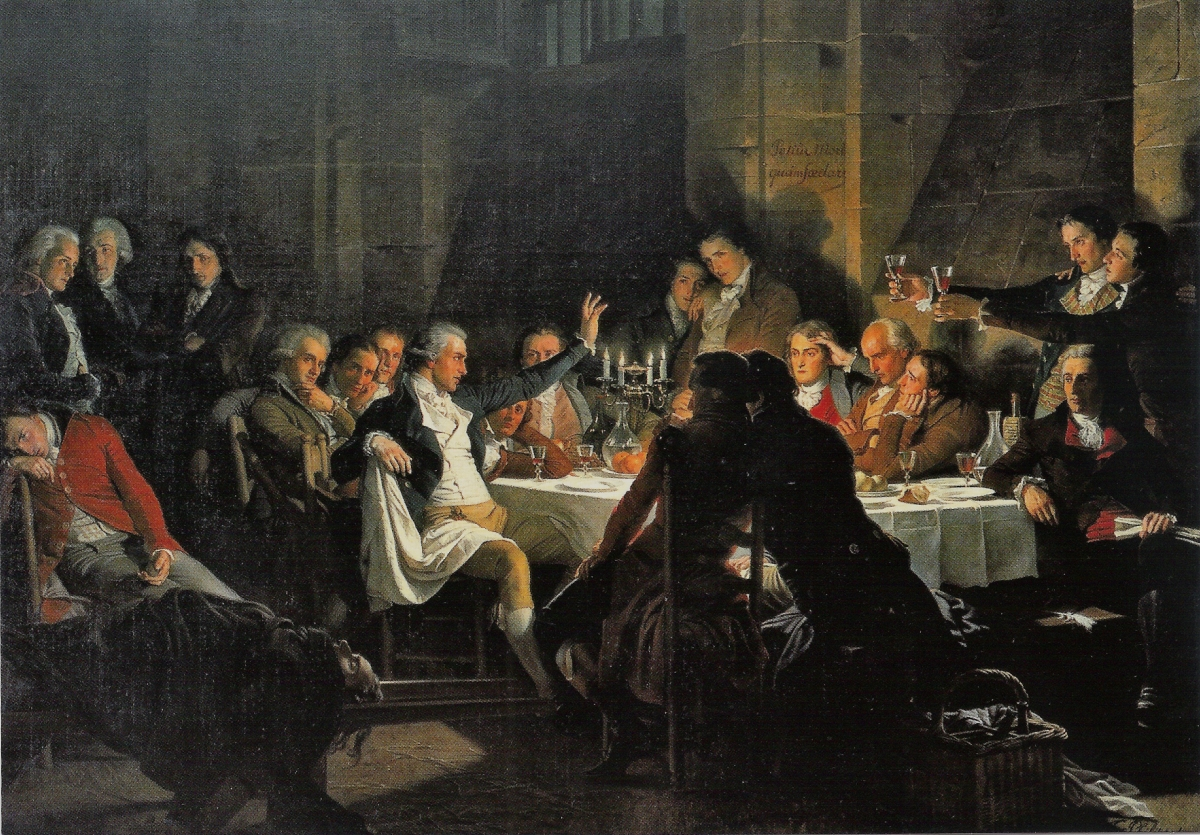
- Artist: Henri Félix Emmanuel Philippoteaux.
- Year: 1850
- Type: Oil on canvas, history painting
- Dimensions: 325 cm × 457 cm (128 in × 180 in)
- Location: Museum of the French Revolution, Vizille

The Last Banquet of the Girondins (French: Le Dernier banquet des Girondins) is an oil on canvas history painting by the French artist Henri Félix Emmanuel Philippoteaux, from 1850.

== History and description ==
It depicts a scene from the Reign of Terror during the French Revolution. After being sentenced to death by their Jacobin opponents on 30 October 1793, twenty one members of the moderate Girondist movement chose not to despair but to sit down for a final dinner at the Conciergerie prison before facing the guillotine the following day.

A former pupil of Léon Cogniet, Philippoteaux was known for his history scenes - particularly battles paintings detailing the Napoleonic era. The painting was displayed at the Salon of 1850 at the Palais-Royal in Paris. Today it is in the collection of the Museum of the French Revolution at Vizille near Grenoble, as part of a long-term loan from the Museum of Fine Arts in Marseille.

== Bibliography ==
- Bertrand, Gilles & Serna, Pierre. La République en voyage, 1770-1830. Presses universitaires de Rennes, 2013.
- Whiteley, Linda & Bann, Stephen. Painting History: Delaroche and Lady Jane Grey. National Gallery Company, 2010.
