= Leffincourt =

- Commune
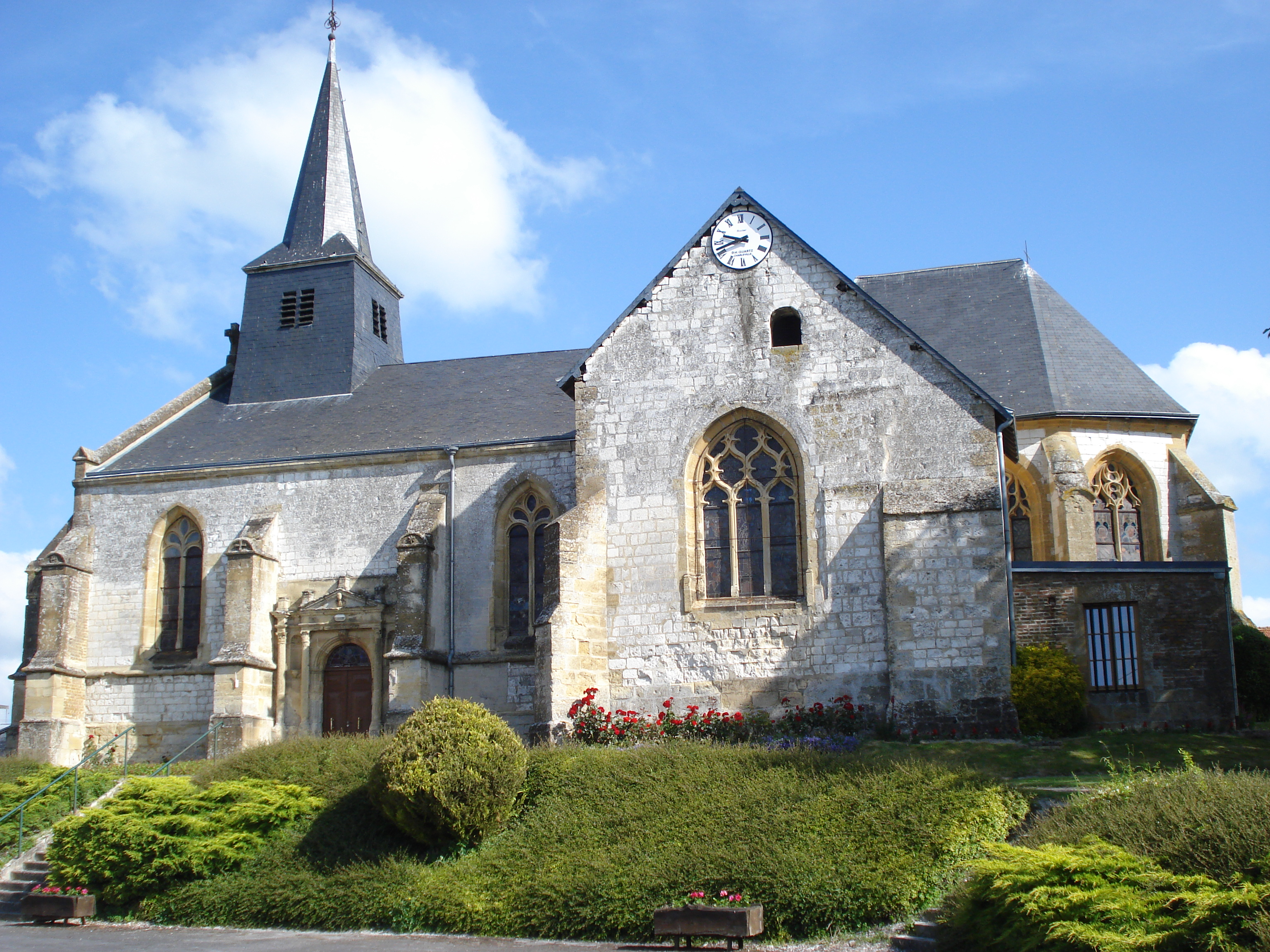
- The church in Leffincourt
- Location of Leffincourt
- Location within France Location within Grand Est
- Coordinates: 49°23′16″N 4°32′50″E
- Country: France
- Region: Grand Est
- Department: Ardennes
- Arrondissement: Vouziers
- Canton: Attigny
- Intercommunality: Argonne Ardennaise

Government
  - Mayor (2020–2026): Christophe Manceaux
- Area^{1}: 18.02 km^{2} (6.96 sq mi)
- Elevation: 128 m (420 ft)
- Highest elevation: 183 m (600 ft)
- Lowest elevation: 113 m (371 ft)
- Population (2023): 190
  - Density: 11/km^{2} (27/sq mi)
- Time zone: UTC+01:00 (CET)
  - Summer (DST): UTC+02:00 (CEST)
- INSEE/Postal code: 08250 /08310
- ^{1} French Land Register data, which excludes lakes, ponds, glaciers > 1 km^{2} (0.386 sq mi or 247 acres) and river estuaries.

Leffincourt (French pronunciation: [lefɛ̃kuʁ]) is a commune in the Ardennes department in northern France.

== Population ==
Historical population
Year	Pop.	±% p.a.
1968	205	—
1975	170	−2.64%
1982	176	+0.50%
1990	160	−1.18%
1999	149	−0.79%
2007	169	+1.59%
2012	178	+1.04%
2017	189	+1.21%
2023	190	+0.09%
Source: INSEE

== See also ==
- Mazagran
- Communes of the Ardennes department
