= St David's Church, Exeter =

Grade I listed church in England

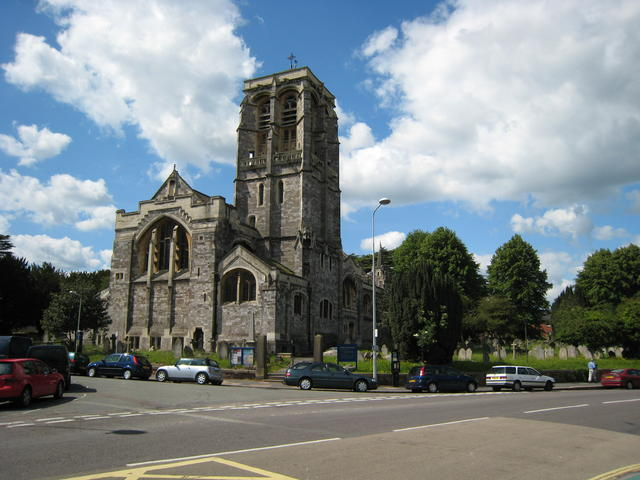
- St David's Church, Exeter
- St David's Church, Exeter
- 50°43′39″N 3°32′18″W
- OS grid reference: SX 91532 93103
- Location: Exeter
- Country: England
- Denomination: Church of England
- Website: stdavidschurchexeter.org.uk

History
- Dedication: St David

Architecture
- Heritage designation: Grade I listed
- Architect: W. D. Caröe
- Groundbreaking: 1897
- Completed: 1900

Administration
- Province: Canterbury
- Diocese: Exeter
- Archdeaconry: Exeter
- Deanery: Christianity
- Parish: Exeter St David's with St Michael and All Angels

St David's Church, Exeter is a church in Exeter, Devon. It is a Grade I listed building.

== History ==
There has been a church on this site since the late Anglo-Saxon period. The current building was designed by W. D. Caröe and completed in 1900. It was described by John Betjeman as "the finest example of Victorian church architecture in the south west". The previous church on the site was started in 1816 and was built in a Greek Doric style, but was demolished and rebuilt at the turn of the 20th century.

Alexander Cavalie Mercer, hero of the Battle of Waterloo, is buried in the graveyard of St David's Church.

== Organ ==
The first organ was installed in 1817 and was by William Thomas. The largest pipe of the organ was 12 feet long and 7 inches in width. This was later transferred to Sidmouth Methodist Church.

The current organ was installed in 1902 by Hele and Co. A specification of the organ can be found on the National Pipe Organ Register.
