= The Battle of Waterloo: The British Squares Receiving the Charge of the French Cuirassiers =

Painting by Henri Félix Emmanuel Philippoteaux

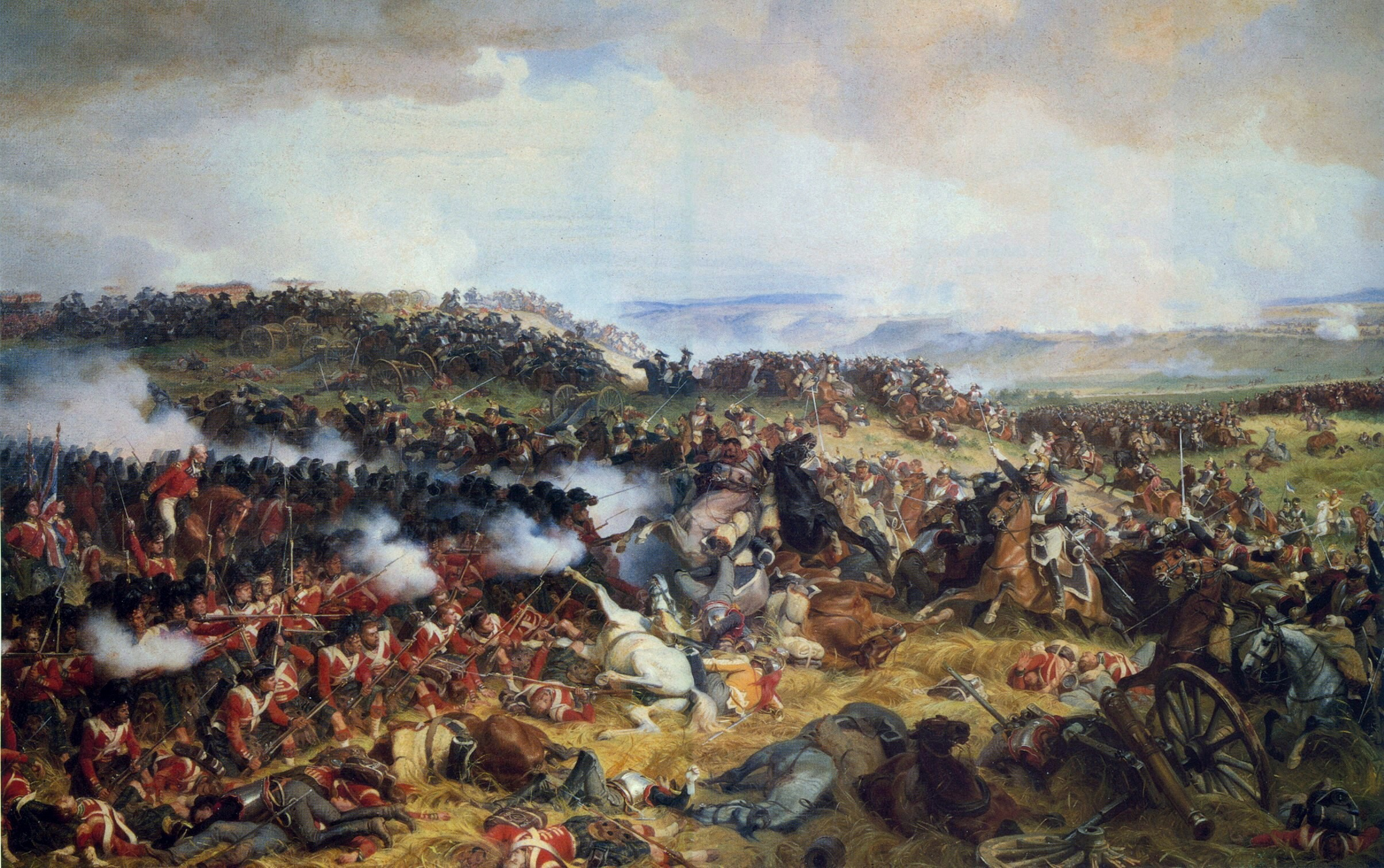
- Artist: Henri Félix Emmanuel Philippoteaux
- Year: 1874
- Type: Oil on canvas, history painting
- Dimensions: 99 cm × 155 cm (39 in × 61 in)
- Location: Victoria and Albert Museum, London

The Battle of Waterloo: The British Squares Receiving the Charge of the French Cuirassiers is an oil on canvas painting by French artist Henri Félix Emmanuel Philippoteaux, from 1874. It measures 99 × 155 centimetres (39 × 61 in). It is held at the Victoria and Albert Museum, in London.

== History and description ==
It depicts a scene from the Battle of Waterloo on 18 June 1815, with squares of red-coated infantry from Sir Thomas Picton's British 5th Division to the left being charged by cavalrymen of the French 5th and 10th Cuirassiers in blue uniforms to the right. The main British unit is one of Highland infantry, with the colour party and a mounted officer taking refuge in the centre of the square. An abandoned cannon lies in the foreground and at middle distance.

The meticulous academic painting was exhibited at the Royal Academy Summer Exhibition in 1875 and was described by John Ruskin as a "carefully-studied and skilful battle piece".

== Provenance ==
It was displayed at the Royal Academy Exhibition of 1875 at Burlington House in London. It is thought that the painting was bought by Francis Reubell Bryan in around 1875; he donated it to the Victoria and Albert Museum in 1880. The V&A also holds a sketch, made in oils on paper laid on canvas.
