= Carel Frederik Krahmer de Bichin =

Dutch artillery officer

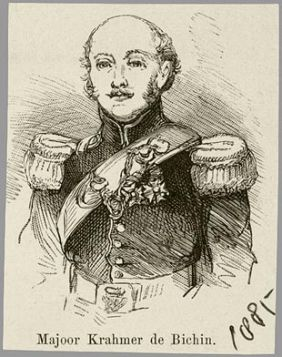
- Major C.F. Krahmer de Bichin
- Born: 28 June 1787; Korbach
- Died: 23 September 1830 (aged 43); Brussels
- Military career
- Allegiance: United Kingdom of the Netherlands
- Branch: Artillery
- Service years: 1804–1830
- Rank: Major
- Unit: 7th/8th company of Horse Artillery
- Conflicts: Napoleonic Wars; Battle of Friedland; Battle of Waterloo
- Awards: Knight's Cross 4th class Military William Order

Carel Frederik Krahmer de Bichin (28 June 1787, Korbach, Waldeck – 23 September 1830, Brussels) was a Dutch artillery officer. He took part in several campaigns of the French Grande Armée in Dutch army units of the Batavian Republic and the Kingdom of Holland that were attached to that army. After the United Kingdom of the Netherlands regained its independence he joined its army. He commanded, as a captain, a battery of horse artillery that played a pivotal role in the Battle of Waterloo. He died in action as a major during the Belgian Revolution of 1830.

== Early career ==
Krahmer (he took the name Krahmer de Bichin only after 1815) originally came from the principality of Waldeck in Germany. He entered the service of the Batavian Republic as a cadet with the 2nd Artillery Battalion in January 1804. He was promoted to second lieutenant on 29 September 1806, and assigned to the first horse battery of that bataillon. This battery was attached to the (Dutch) Armée du Nord of the Kingdom of Holland that same month and it took part in the campaign of Marshal Mortier's army corps in Swedish Pomerania in 1807.

Assigned to gen. Mihaud's first division Krahmer participated in the Battle of Friedland of 1807. After the battery ran out of ammunition, Krahmer's single 6-pdr gun alone continued firing, with ammunition supplied by a nearby French battery. For this he later received the Légion d'honneur.

Krahmer was promoted to first lieutenant on 8 August 1808. He earlier participated in the Dutch/Danish attack on Stralsund, on 31 May 1808, fighting an artillery duel to cover the infantry attack.

After Krahmer transferred to the foot artillery he was promoted to captain on 31 August 1813. He had been integrated into the French army with the rest of the Dutch army after the annexation of the Kingdom of Holland in 1810. He took part in the final German campaign of Napoleon I of France's army in 1813, was taken prisoner as part of the garrison of Dresden, and imprisoned in Hungary.

== Battle of Waterloo ==
After his release he entered the service of the by now again independent Netherlands in the "south Netherlands" (i.e. Belgian) part of its army in 1814. He received command, in the rank of captain, of a horse artillery battery, part of the combined 7th/8th company of the horse artillery corps. This battery was manned by Belgians. The battery was attached to the First Brigade (Col. Hendrik Detmers) of the Third Netherlands Division (general Chassé) on the eve of the battle of Waterloo.

Initially the Third Division was placed in reserve on the right wing of the Anglo-Allied army of the Duke of Wellington. Later it was ordered forward, behind the British troops of Sir Colin Halkett's Fifth Brigade. When Chassé noticed a slackening of the firing of one of the British artillery batteries (apparently due to lack of ammunition), he ordered Krahmer's battery forward to take this battery's place. He came in line behind the hollow road, to the left of Lloyd's battery, where Cleeve's battery had been.

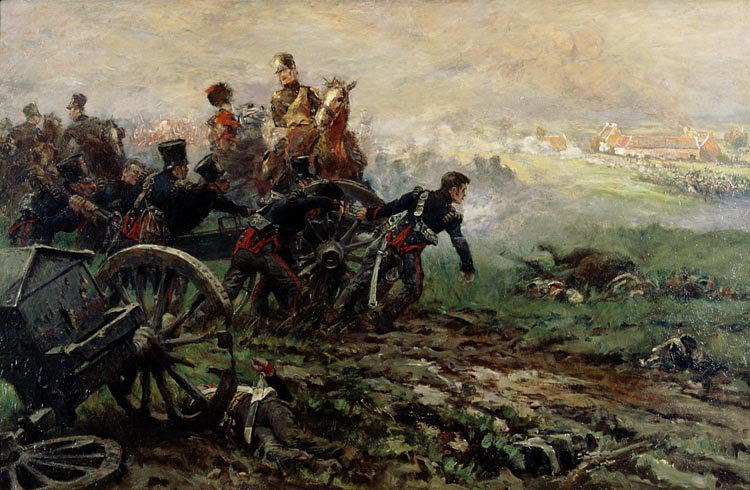
The horse artillery unlimbers by Jan Hoynck van Papendrecht

Now the action unfolded that is depicted in Jan Hoynck van Papendrecht's painting, entitled De rijdende artillerie komt in stelling (The horse artillery unlimbers). He immediately engaged a French battery near La Haye Sainte that was enfilading the British artillery at the time, forcing it out of position. Next the battery started pouring a murderous fire into the French Middle Guard division, cutting lanes through its columns. When next the Detmers brigade performed a bayonet attack on the French Guards, Krahmer came forward to support it under the direction of Major Van der Smissen. As a consequence the French Guards faltered and eventually broke. This was the turning point in the battle. During the action, Krahmer's battery lost 27 men dead and 21 wounded.

== Later career ==
Depiction of the death of Captain Krahmer de Bichin in Brussels during the September Days of the Belgian Revolution in 1830.

For his action Krahmer was given the Knight's Cross 4th class of the Military William Order on 18 July 1815. He next took part in the final campaign of the Allied army in northern France until the fall of Paris.

In the early 1820s Krahmer wrote the words for the regimental song of the Belgo-Dutch horse artillery: Nous sommes tous de francs lurons (We are all likely lads).

On 1 August 1826 Krahmer was promoted to major of horse artillery. He took part in the opening stage of the Dutch campaign to suppress the Belgian Revolution militarily in August 1830. He died in action during bloody street fighting in Brussels, on 23 September 1830.
