= The Battle of Rivoli =

Painting by Henri Félix Emmanuel Philippoteaux

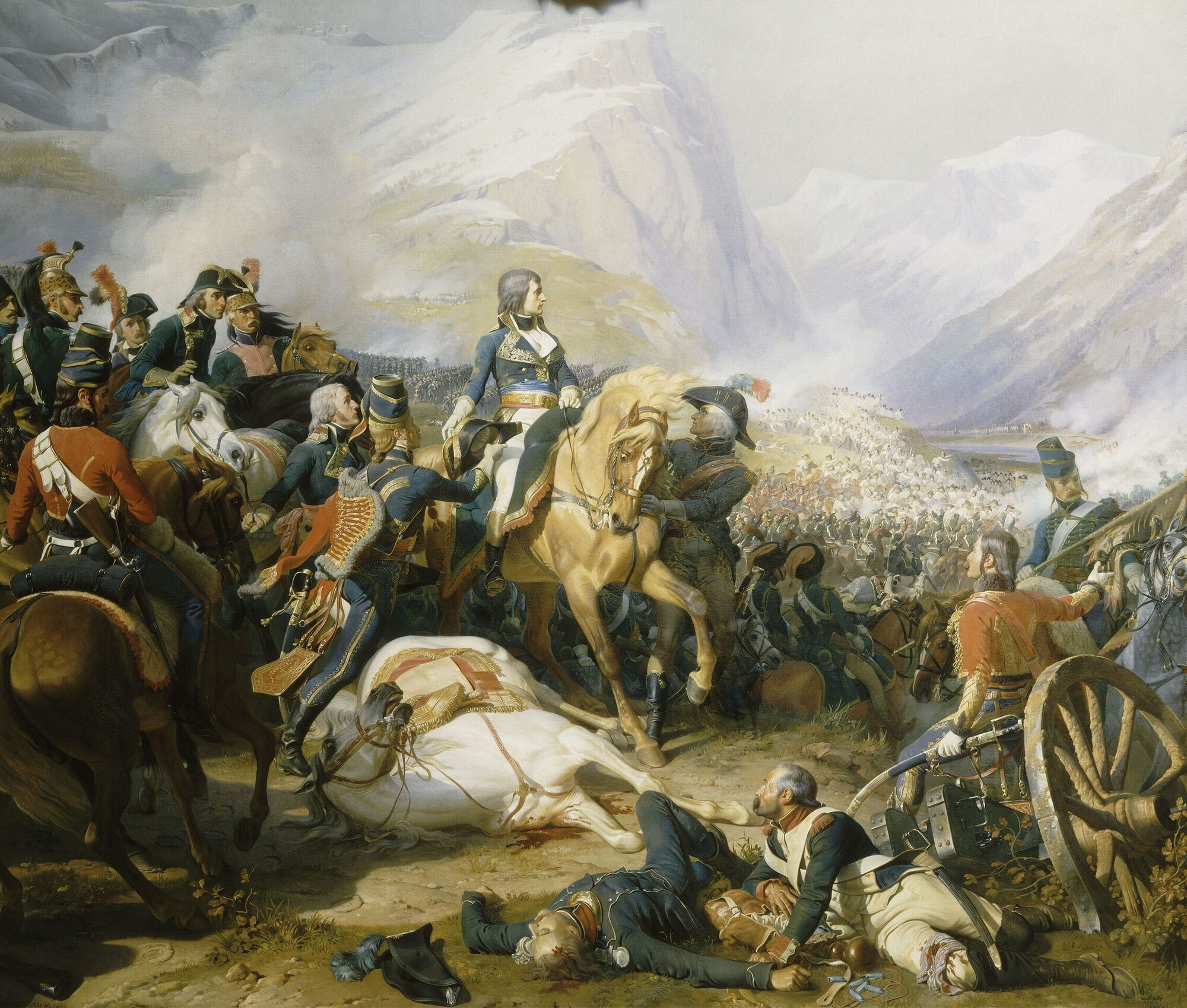
- Artist: Henri Félix Emmanuel Philippoteaux
- Year: 1844
- Medium: Oil on canvas
- Dimensions: 465 cm × 543 cm (183 in × 214 in)
- Location: Palace of Versailles, Versailles

The Battle of Rivoli (French: La Bataille de Rivoli) is an oil on canvas history painting by the French artist Henri Félix Emmanuel Philippoteaux, from 1844.

== History and description ==
Also known as Napoleon at the Battle of Rivoli, it depicts a scene from the Battle of Rivoli during the French Revolutionary Wars. Fought on 14 January 1797 during the Italian Campaign, it was a decisive victory for the French Army of Italy over the Austrians. The painting shows the French commander General Bonaparte on horseback at the centre of the scene. It also features Jean-Baptiste Bessières and Antoine Charles Louis de Lasalle.

Philippoteaux was a noted painter of battle scenes and other historical works. The painting was commissioned by the French state as part of a large-scale series of pictures based on past French military victories produced during the July Monarchy. The original commission was given to another artist, Leon Cogniet, who Philippoteaux replaced. It was exhibited at the Salon of 1845, held at the Louvre in Paris. Today it is the Galerie des Batailles, in the Palace of Versailles.

== Bibliography ==
- Gervereau, Laurent. La guerre sans dentelles. Skira-Flammarion, 2009.
- Hornstein, Katie. Picturing War in France, 1792–1856. Yale University Press, 2018
- Salmon, Xavier. Pomp and Power: French Drawings from Versailles. Wallace Collection, 2006.
