= Henri Félix Emmanuel Philippoteaux =

French painter (1815–1884)

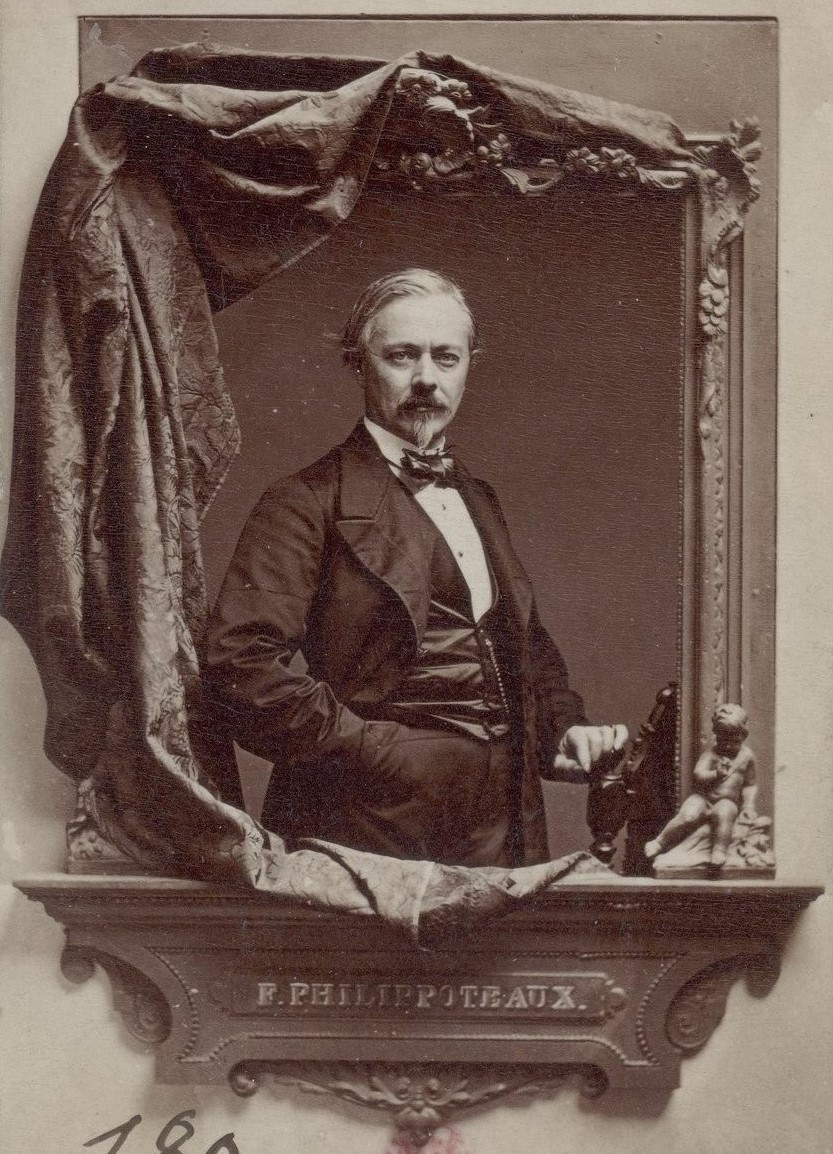
- Photograph by Adolphe Dallemagne, from the studio of Nadar
- Born: 3 April 1815; Paris, France
- Died: 8 November 1884 (aged 69); Paris, France
- Known for: Painter; Illustrator
- Movement: Romanticism

Henri Félix Emmanuel Philippoteaux (French pronunciation: [ɑ̃ʁi feliks emanɥɛl filipɔto]; 3 April 1815 – 8 November 1884) was a French artist and illustrator, known primarily as a battle painter.

== Life and works ==
He was born in Paris, France, studied art at the studio of Léon Cogniet, and first exhibited his work at the Paris Salon of 1833.

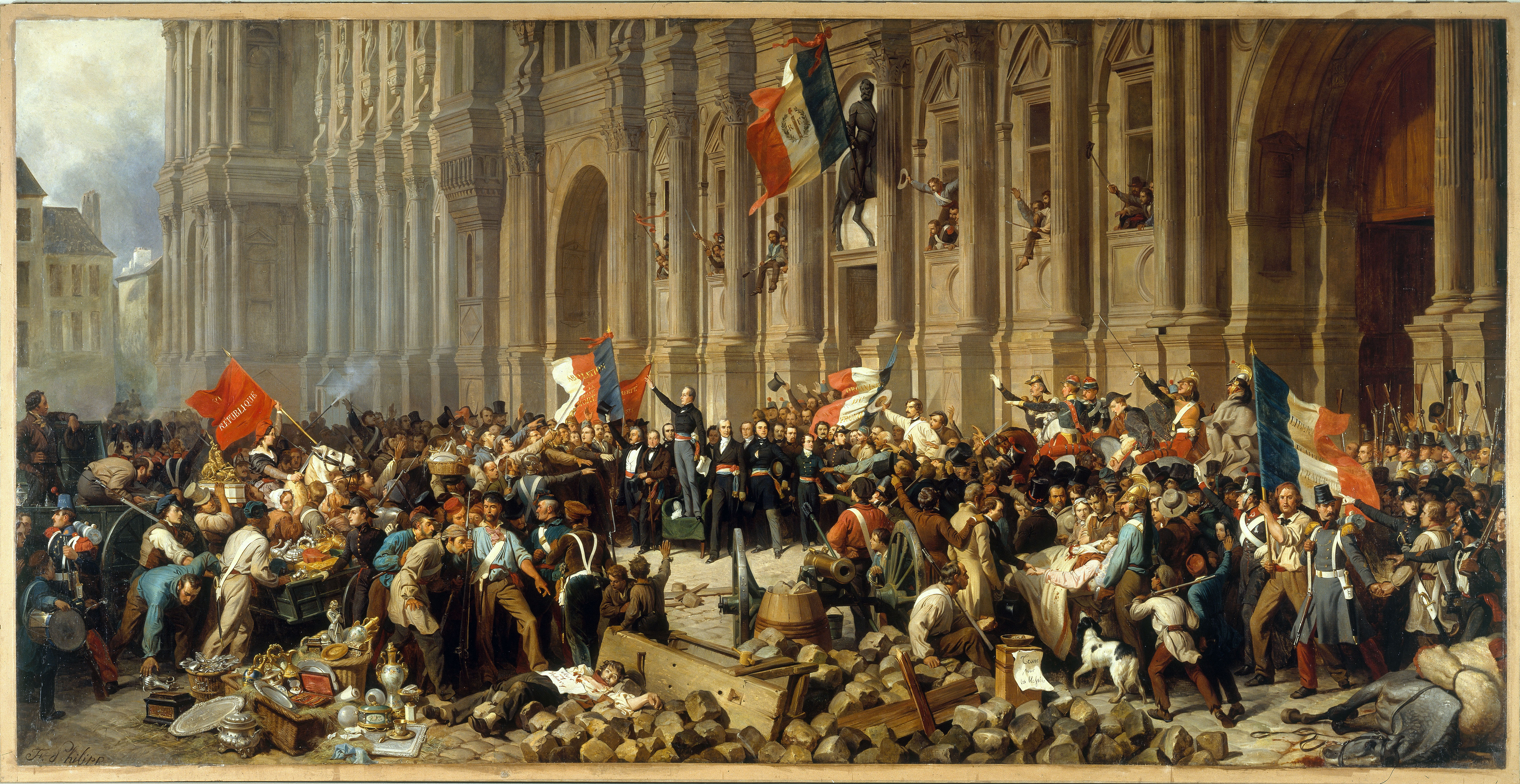
Lamartine Rejecting the Red Flag in Front of the City Hall, depicting the 1848 Revolution

One of his best-known works was a depiction of the Siege of Paris during the Franco-Prussian War, painted in the form of a cyclorama, a type of large panoramic painting on the inside of a cylindrical platform designed to provide a viewer standing in the middle of the cylinder with a 360° view of the painting. Viewers surrounded by the panoramic image are meant to feel as if they are standing in the midst of a historic event or famous place.

Philippoteaux also produced a large number of works chronicling the rise and successes of Napoleon, including a portrait of Napoleon in his regimental uniform and a group of paintings of French victories in the Napoleonic Wars. Philippoteaux was awarded the Légion d'honneur in 1846.

Philippoteaux's son Paul Philippoteaux was also an artist; both were famous for their production of cycloramas. Father and son collaborated on The Defence of the Fort d'Issy in 1871. They also collaborated on a cyclorama of the Battle of Gettysburg that became a celebrated work in the United States:

"One cyclorama, however, halted the slide in popularity, and almost single-handedly revived the public's interest in the medium for another decade...this singular creation was initially painted in 1882-83 by Henry F. Philippoteaux and Paul Philippoteaux, a father and son team of French artists...within a year, half a million people had stood before it."

Father and son enhanced the artistic effect of their cylindrical painting by adding a third dimension, including elements of diorama placed in front of the painting, and by incorporating sections of walls and battlefield objects that blended into the painted parts of the presentation.

He died in 1884 in Paris and his obituary in the New York Times appeared on November 10, 1884.

== Partial list of works ==
- Les Gentilshommes du Duc d'Orléans
- The Iceberg, Episode of the Wars of America (1833)
- The Retreat from Moscow (1835)
- The Capture of Ypres (1837)
- Death of Turenne
- The Siege of Antwerp in 1792
- Colonel Fr. Ponsonby rescued on the battlefield of Waterloo, by a French Officer
- They are in our House (1880)
- The Periwinkle
- The Deception
- The Blade of Grass
- The Return from the Dram-shop (1853)
- The Arrival of La Dorade at Courbevoie (1867)
- The Battle of the Raab
- The Passage of the Tagliamento
- The Siege of Antwerp in 1832
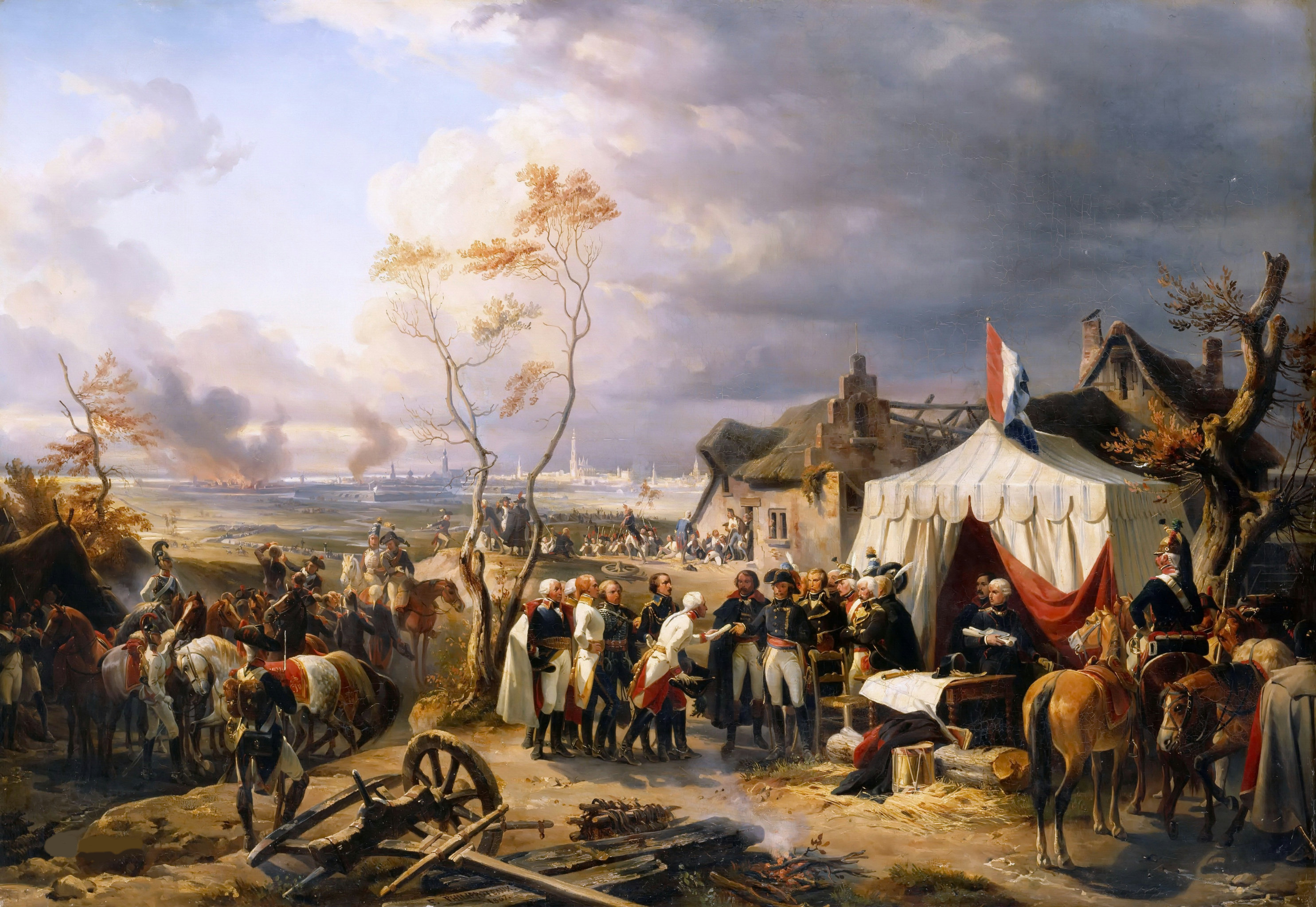
The Capitulation of the Citadel at Antwerp, 1837

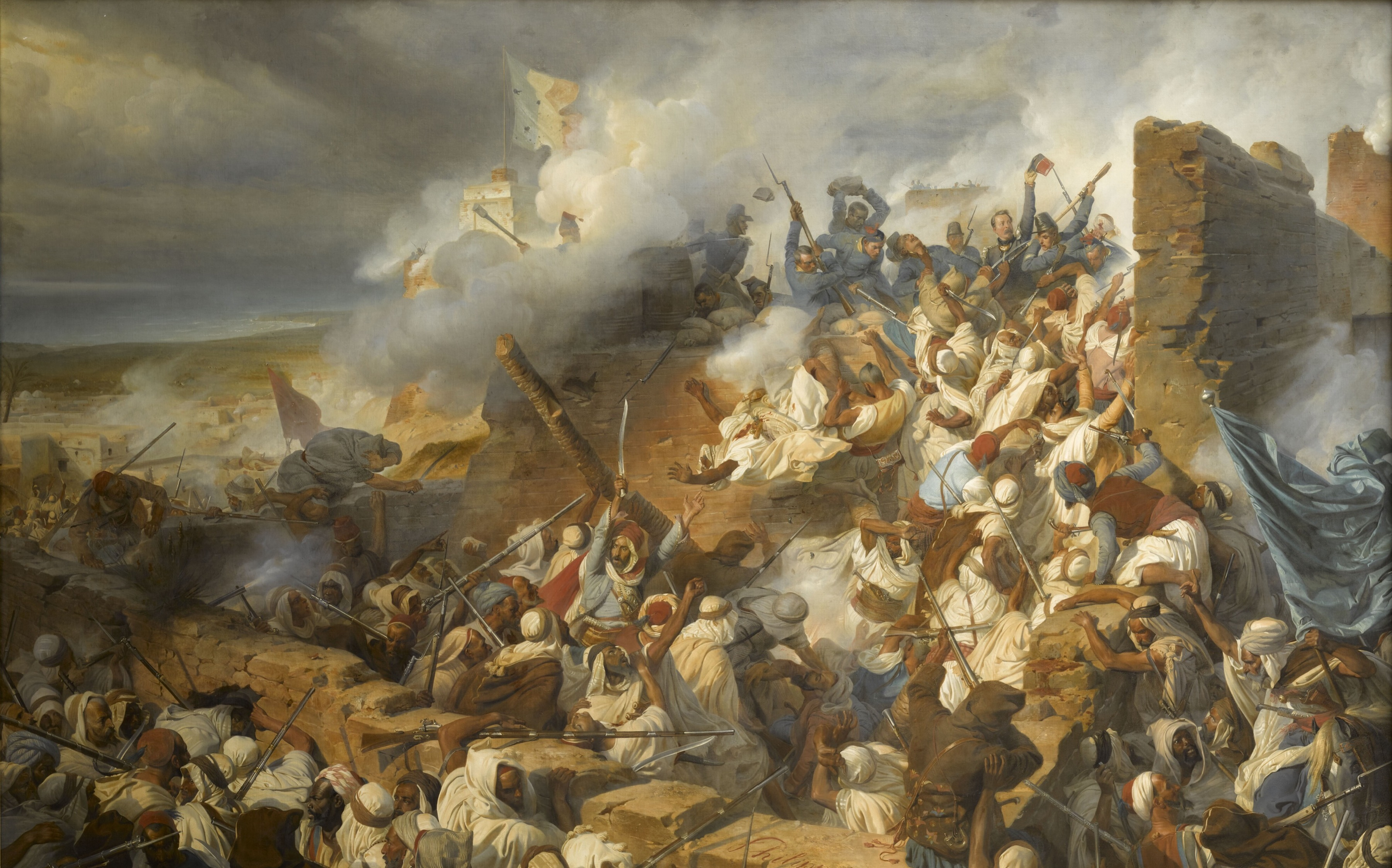
The Defence of Mazagran, 1841

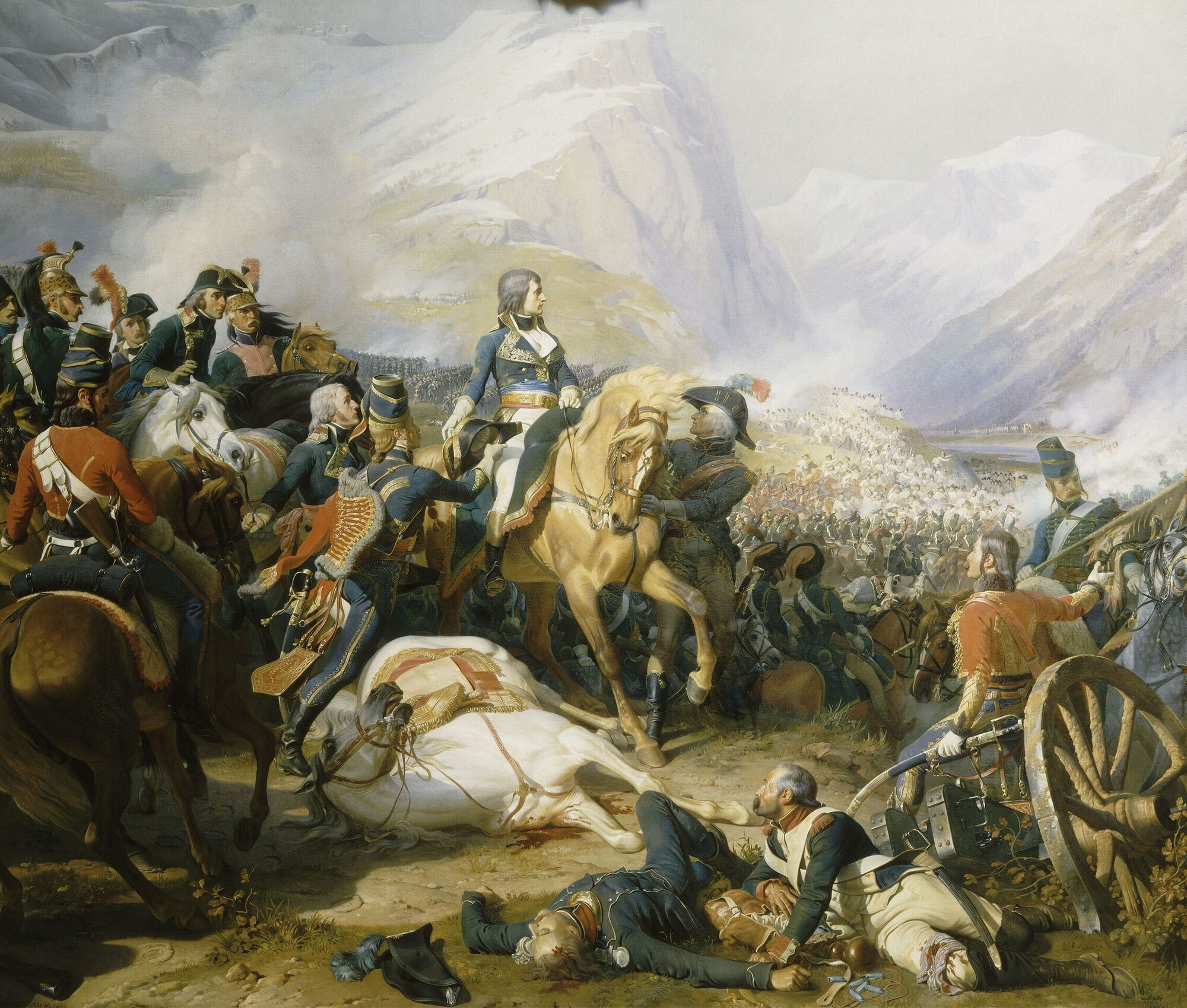
The Battle of Rivoli, 1844

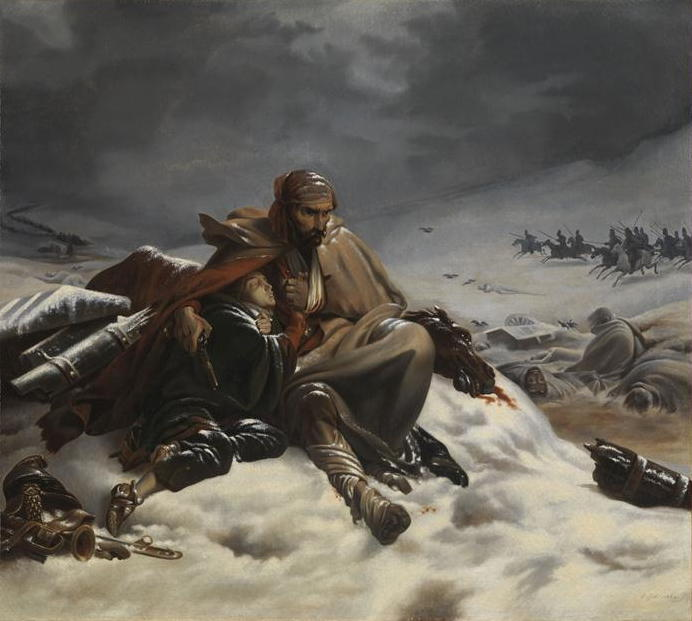
Episode de la Campagne de Russie, 1848, Musée de l'Armée, Paris

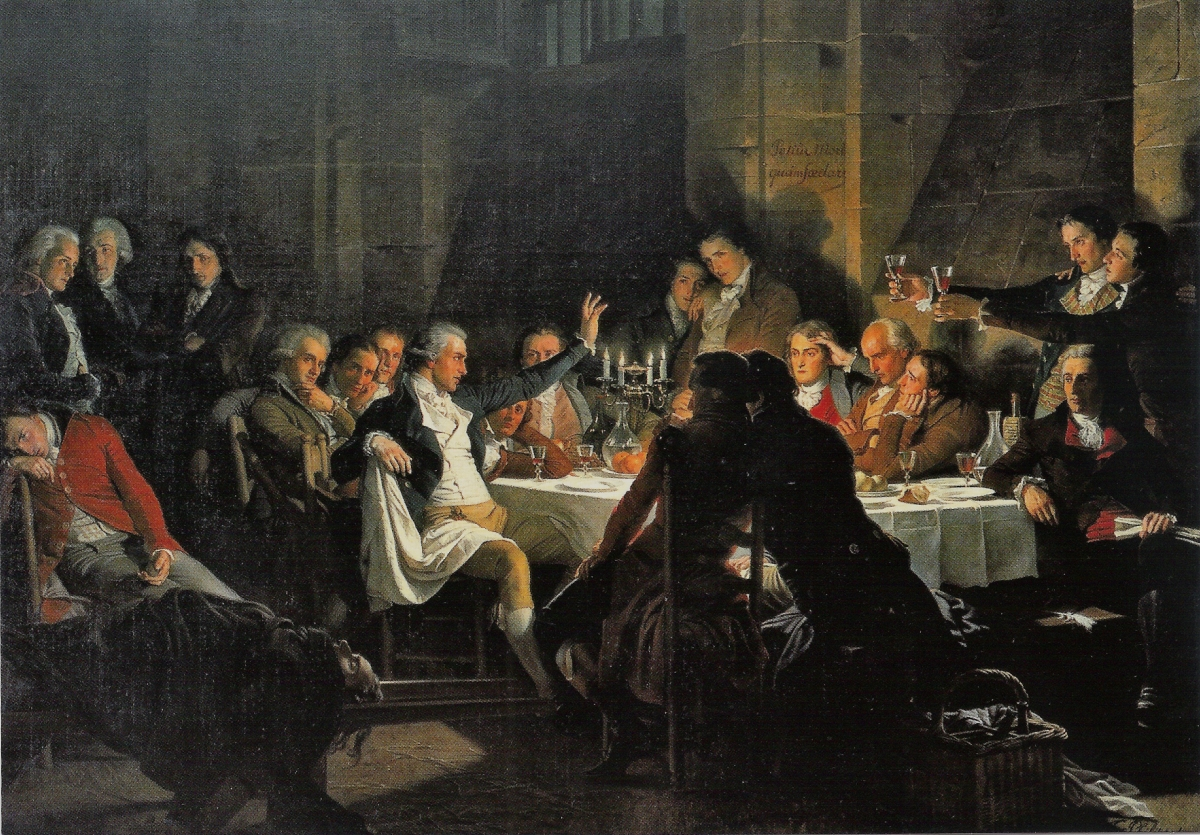
The Last Banquet of the Girondins, 1850

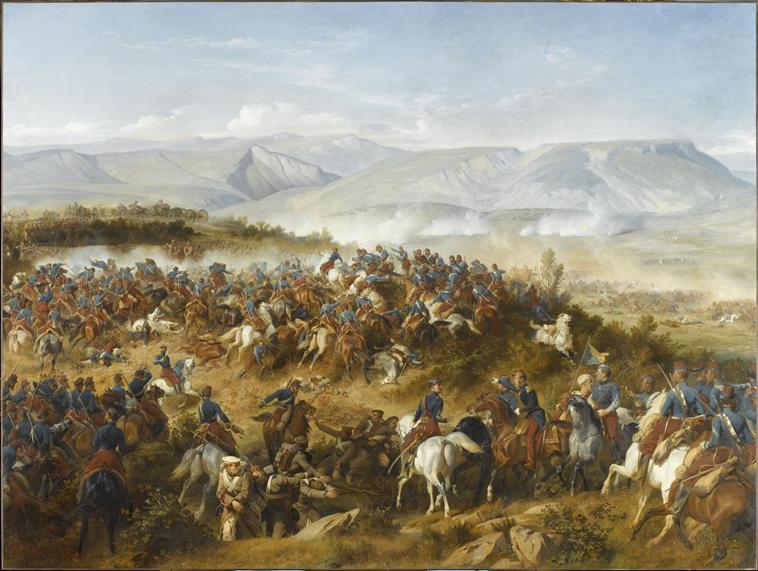
The Battle of Balaklava, 1859

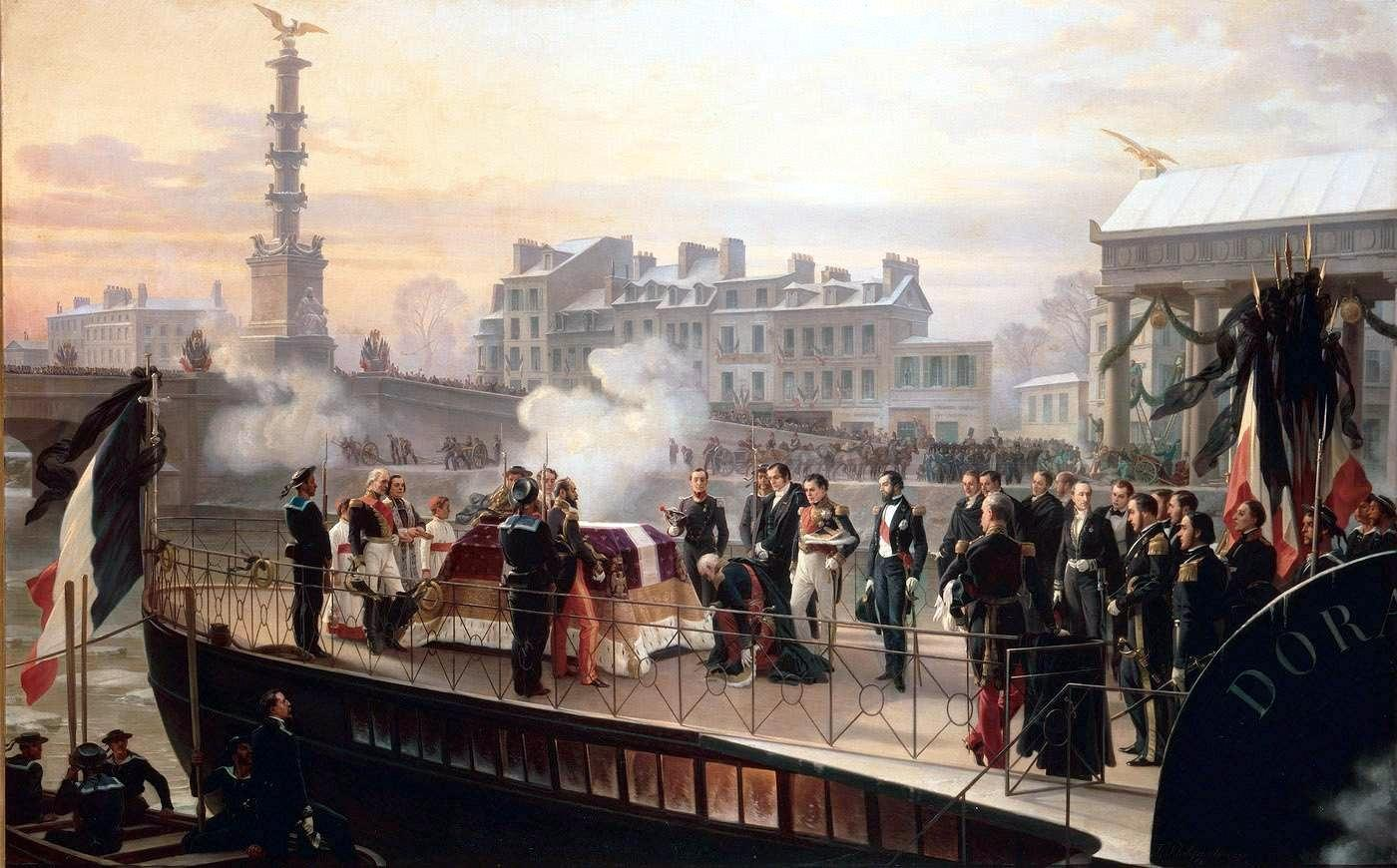
The Arrival of La Dorade at Courbevoie, 1867, Château de Malmaison

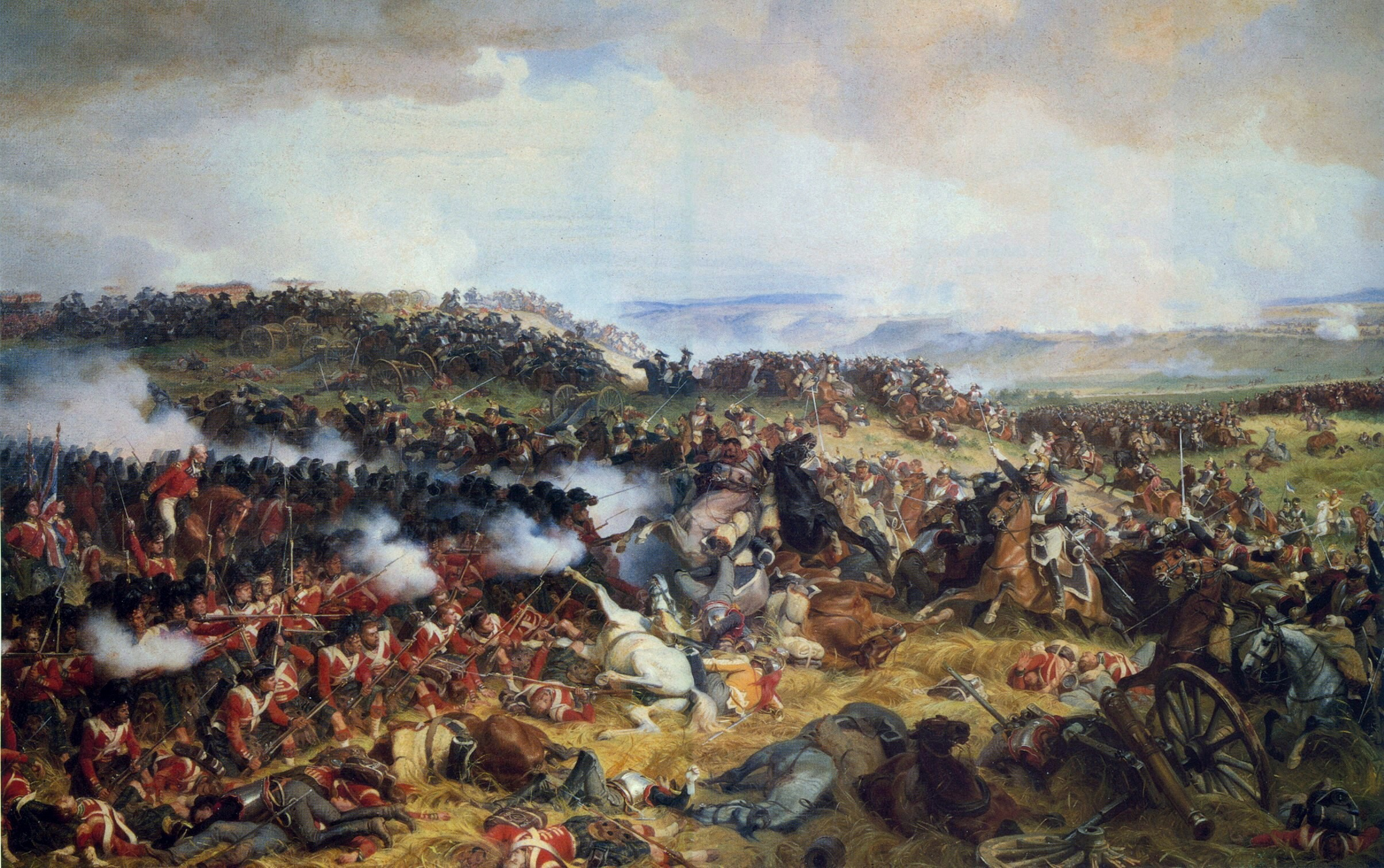
The Battle of Waterloo, 1874
