= Battle of Mazagran =

1840 French conquest of Algeria battle

Coordinates: 35.8956°N 0.0714°E

- Part of the French conquest of Algeria
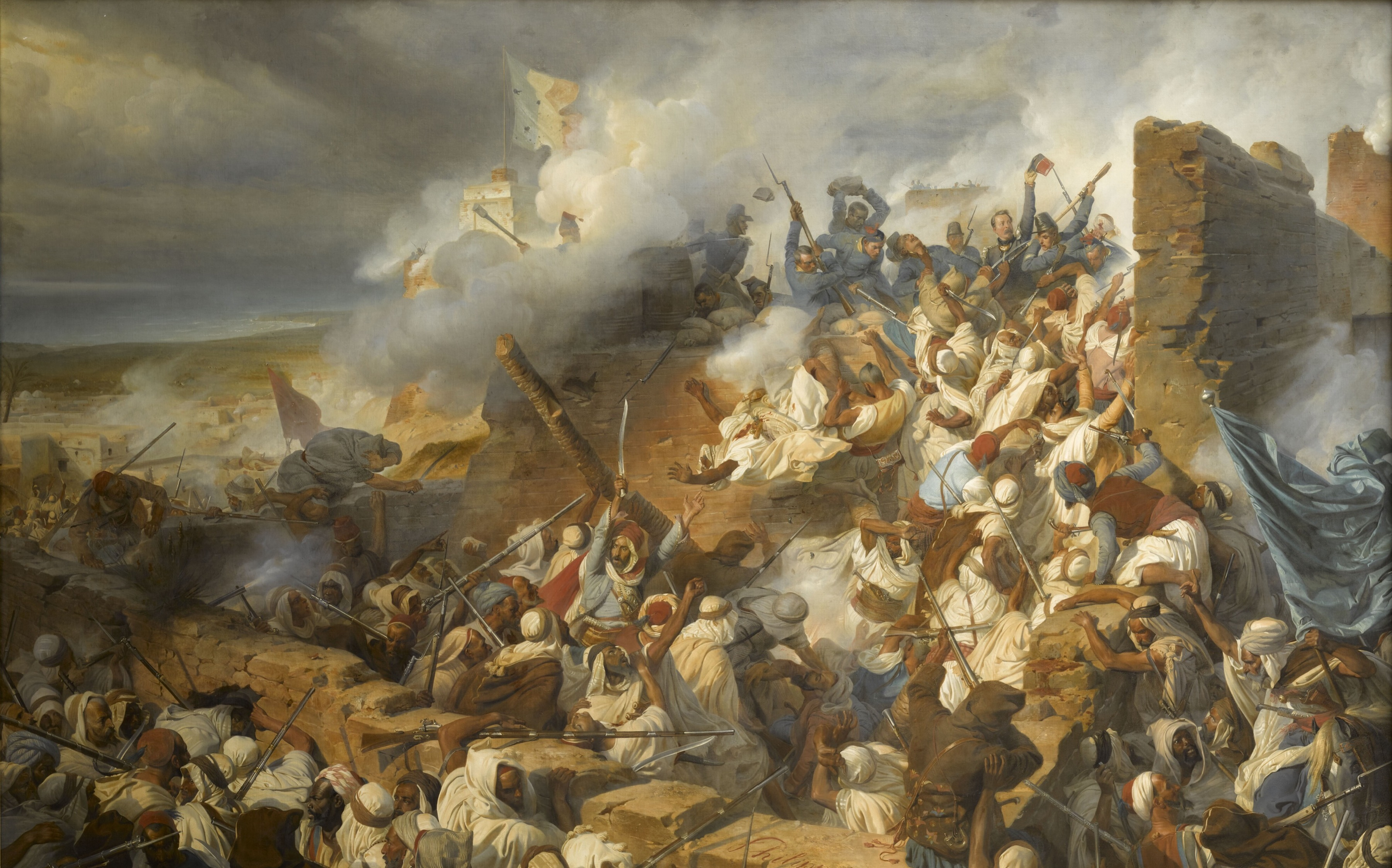
- The Defence of Mazagran; Henri Félix Emmanuel Philippoteaux, 1841
Date	Early February 1840
Location	Mazagran, near Mostaganem, French Algeria
Result	French victory

Belligerents
France	Emirate of Abdelkader

Commanders and leaders
Captain Hilaire Lelièvre; Lieutenant Colonel Dubarrail	Ben Khami

Strength
123 Light Infantrymen	1,200; 2 cannons

Casualties and losses
3 killed, 16 wounded	500 to 600

The Battle of Mazagran was a combat between Arab and Berber forces against French troops during the French conquest of Algeria. The small French contingent, holed up in a fortification at Mazagran, near the port city of Mostaganem, withstood several days of assault by `Abd al-Qādir 's troops. Unaware that the French defenders were running short of gunpowder, Abd al-Qādir's troops withdrew after several days of ineffectual activity.

While the standoff was a relatively minor affair, the French press touted the event as a great success. Captain Lelièvre was rewarded for his success, and a medal was struck commemorating the action. The battle of Mazagran became the anniversary of the Battalions of Light Infantry of Africa, a French penal military unit.

== Background ==
In 1839, the French conquest of Algeria, which had begun in 1830, entered a new phase when `Abd al-Qādir renewed the struggle after French troops deliberately violated the 1837 Treaty of Tafna.

Lieutenant Colonel Dubuessil, the commander of the French garrison at Mostaganem, ordered Captain Lelièvre and 122 men from the 10th Company of the Battalion of Africa to occupy a small fort in the town of Mazagran. They arrived at the fort on 1 February, which was fortified with a single 4-pound gun, one barrel of gunpowder, and between 30,000 and 40,000 cartridges of ammunition.

== Battle ==
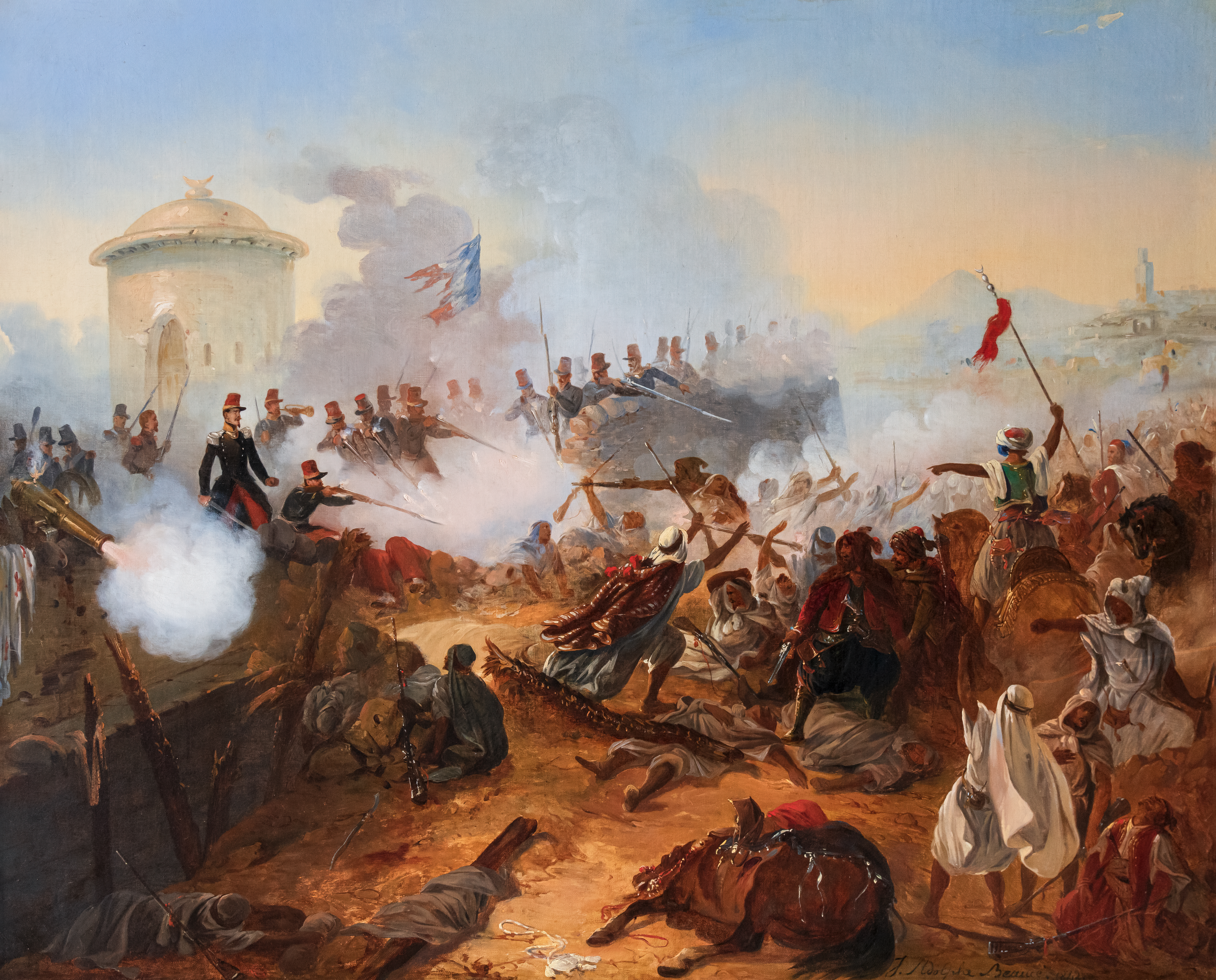
Captain Lelièvre's Heroic Defence at Mazagran by Jean-Adolphe Beaucé, 1842

According to some sources, Algerian resistance forces under the command of Ben Khami (one of Abdal-Qādir's lieutenants) began arriving and surrounding the fort as early as the evening of 1 February, with actual organized assault beginning either then or the next day. Other sources place the arrival of these forces on 2 February, with attack commencing the next day. The duration of the battle is reported to be either three or four days.

Khami's force, initially reported by the French as numbering anywhere from ten to twenty thousand (although later analysis suggests it was considerably smaller) consisted primarily of cavalry. The army had two eight-pound guns, but was apparently not able to use them effectively. For about two days, the battle raged around the fort, but the disciplined garrison was able to repulse all of the attacks.

There was then a break in the fighting, so Lelièvre inventoried the remaining supplies, and determined that only 10,000 rounds remained. He proposed to his men to continue fighting until the ammunition was exhausted, and then to blow up the barrel of gunpowder as their last stand. This proposal was enthusiastically agreed to by his men, and the battle was once again joined. The battle persisted for two more days, until Dubuessil finally sent a relief column, prompting the Algerians to withdraw.

== Aftermath ==
Newspapers in Paris were filled with news of the battle, and it was the talk of the city. A copy of the fort at Mazagran was erected on the Champs Elysées, and all kinds of merchandise was produced that commemorated the event. Lelièvre and six other soldiers received the Légion d'honneur. Lelièvre also received a promotion as a reward for leading the spirited defence. The French government issued a commemorative medal celebrating the victory, and there is today a Rue Mazagran in Paris.

== Accusation of hoax ==
Exasperated by French sarcasms over the British withdrawal from Afghanistan, the London Morning Chronicle published in 1842 an accusation that the event was a hoax, and challenged the French government to substantiate it. These accusations received limited coverage in the French press; the French government did not apparently respond. One correspondent to a British military journal took issue with the Morning Chronicle's reporting, describing an encounter with an unidentified French officer who claimed that something resembling the affair took place, but was significantly puffed up. He reported that Lelièvre was embarrassed over the attention and honours he had received, and eventually requested a transfer out of his regiment. A later French analysis of the affair placed the Arab strength at between five and six hundred.
