= Mazagran, Algeria =

Mazagran Mazagran
- Commune and town
- Mazagran
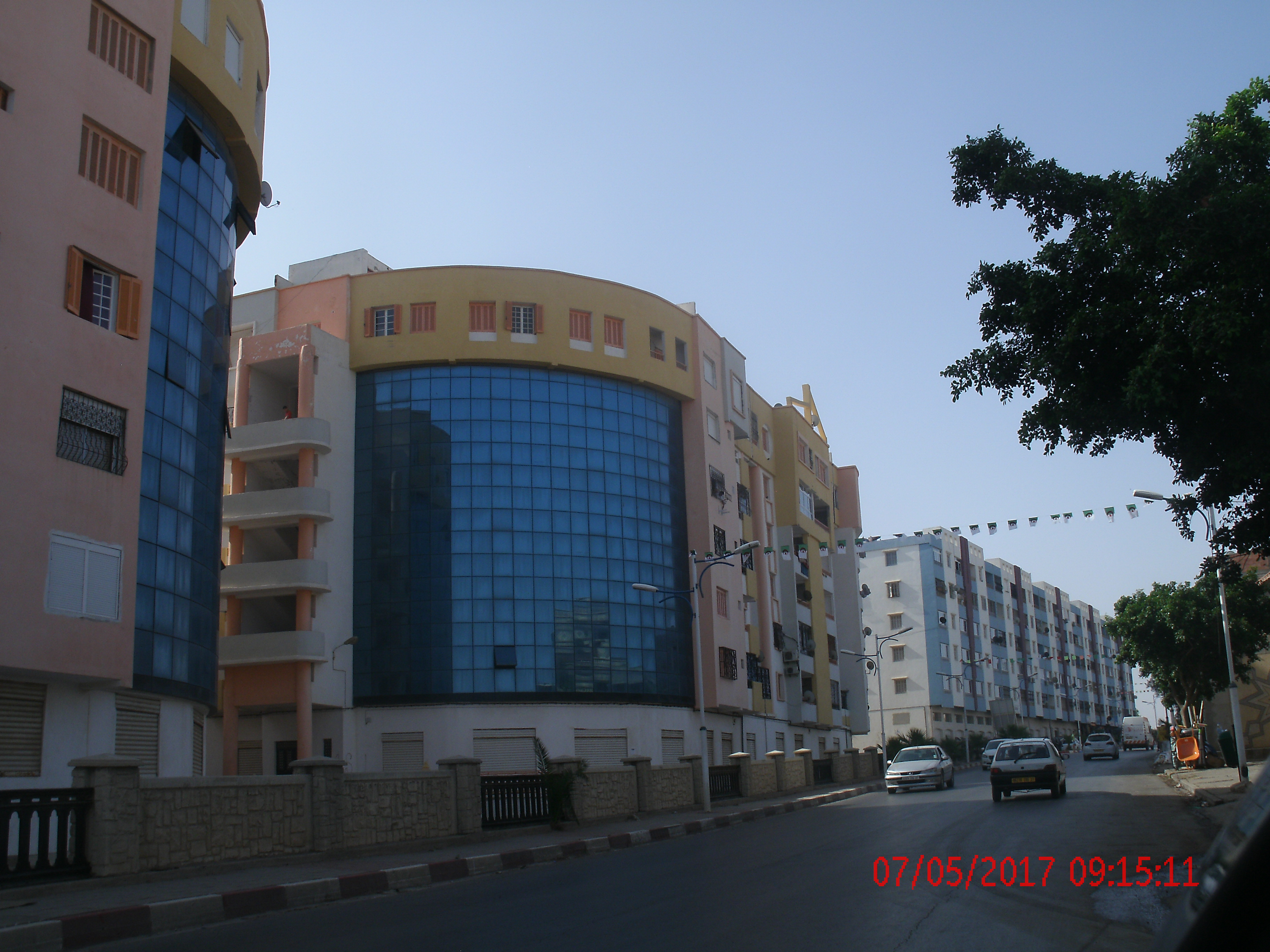

- Location within Algeria
- Coordinates: 35°54′7″N 0°43′37″E
- Country: Algeria
- Province: Mostaganem Province
- District: Hassi Mamèche District

Area
  - Total: 7.7 sq mi (20 km^{2})
  - Land: 7.7 sq mi (20 km^{2})
- Elevation: 660 ft (200 m)

Population (2008)
  - Total: 22,016
  - Density: 2,850/sq mi (1,101/km^{2})
- Time zone: UTC+1 (CET)
- zipcode: 2727
- Area code: +213

Mazagran is a town and commune in Mostaganem Province, Algeria. It is located in Hassi Mamèche District. According to the 2008 census it has a population of 22,016.

Roads Route nationale 11 (Algeria), RW2 and CW7A go through the commune.

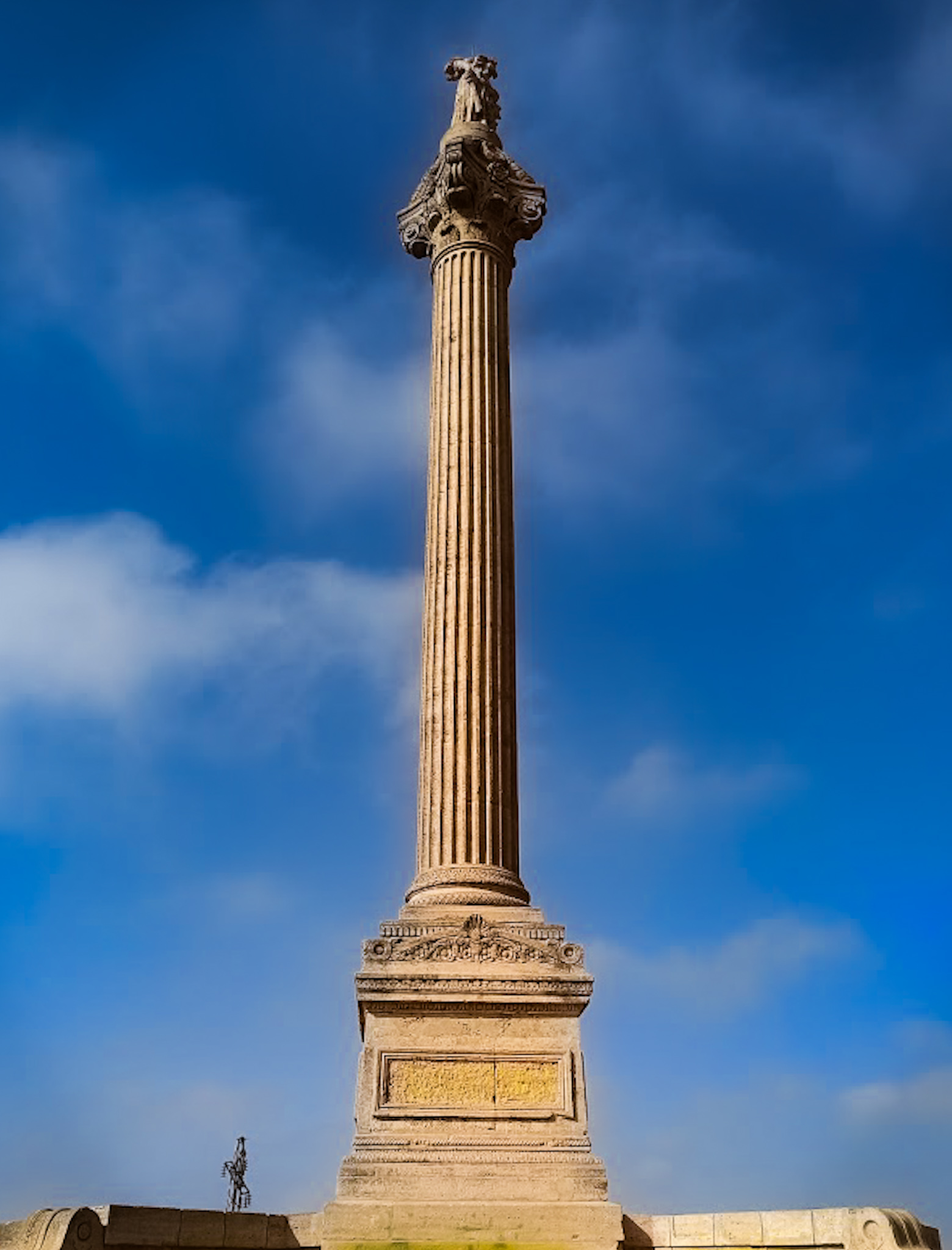
the Column of Mazagran

== See also ==
- Battle of Mazagran
