= Juan Chávez =

Mexican politician and highwayman

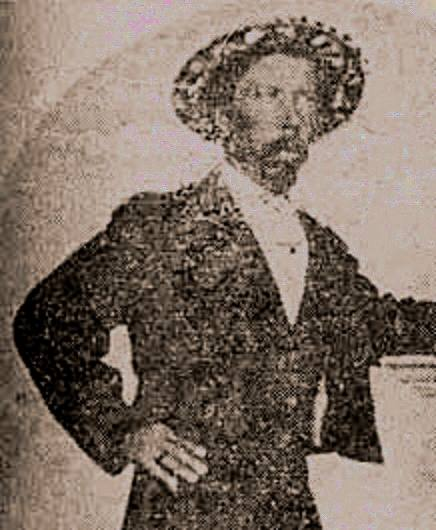

Governor of Aguascalientes
- In office 1863–1864
- Preceded by: José María Chávez Alonso
- Succeeded by: Cayetano Basave

Personal details
- Born: July 4, 1831; Antigua Hacienda de Peñuelas, Aguascalientes
- Died: February 15, 1869 (aged 37); Camino de Arrona, Aguascalientes–Jalisco
- Political party: Conservative
- Spouse: Petra Ávila
- Profession: Politician; Highwayman

Juan Chávez (Antigua Hacienda de Peñuelas, Aguascalientes, July 4, 1831 – Camino de Arrona, February 15, 1869) was the Governor of the State of Aguascalientes, Mexico and its surroundings, also known by the nicknames of "Ídolo de las Beatas" or "Rojas de los Mochos", nicknames that were imposed by the press of the time. He was a partisan of the conservatives and supported the Second Mexican Empire during the French Intervention.

Juan Chávez is an individual around whom various legends and myths have developed that derive from his illicit activities, including that he left a hoard of buried treasure, although very little is really known about his life prior to becoming a thief and highway robber, and the little information with which it is counted from that previous time has been obtained directly from both marriage and death certificates.

== Bibliography ==
- Medrano de Luna, Gabriel (2004). Juan Chávez; una leyenda viva de Aguascalientes. Universidad Autónoma de Aguascalientes. ISBN 978-607-8359-85-1.
