= Auguste Henri Brincourt =

French general (1823–1909)

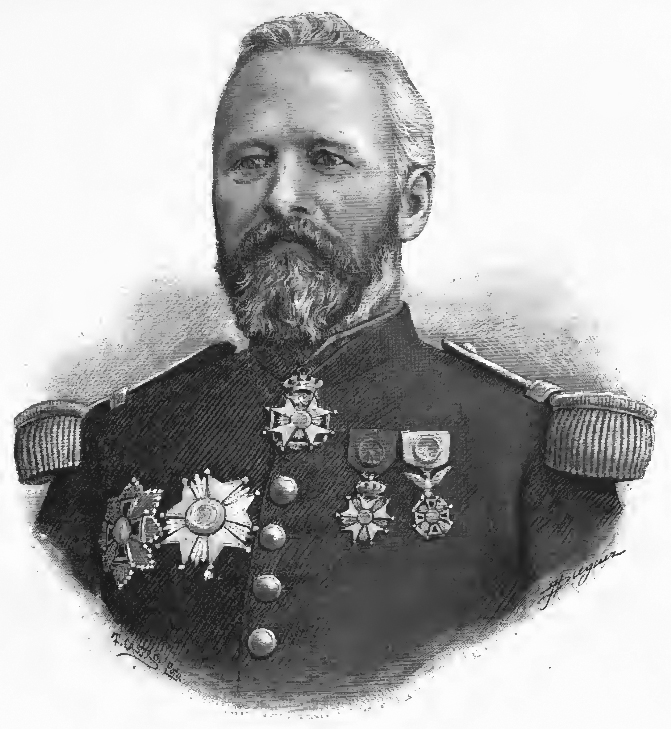
- Born: 25 June 1823
- Died: 10 August 1909 (aged 86)
- Other name: Agustín Enrique Brincourt
- Military career
- Allegiance: Kingdom of France; French Second Republic; Second French Empire
- Branch: French Army
- Rank: General of Division
- Commands: 1st Bde, 1st Div, Imperial Guard; 31st Infantry Division
- Conflicts: Crimean War; Second Italian War of Independence; French Intervention in Mexico; Franco-Prussian War
- Awards: Légion d'honneur (Grand Cross)

Auguste Henri Brincourt (French: [oɡyst ɑ̃ʁi bʁɛ̃kuʁ]; June 25, 1823 - August 10, 1909) was a General of the French Army. He notably served during the French Intervention in Mexico and the Franco-Prussian War and was a recipient of the Grand Cross of the Légion d'honneur.

Brincourt enrolled in the École spéciale militaire de Saint-Cyr in 1841, and graduated in 1843. He took part in the Second Italian War of Independence and was wounded at the Battle of Solferino in 1859. In August 1865, Brincourt led a force of 2,500 men into northern Mexico with the objective of driving Benito Juárez out of Mexico, resulting in the capture of Chihuahua. Brincourt led an infantry brigade of the Imperial Guard during the Franco-Prussian war in 1870 and 1871.
