= José María Chávez Alonso =

Mexican politician

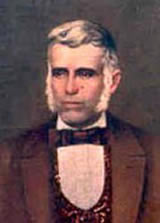
José María Chávez Alonso

José María Chávez Alonso (26 February 1812, Encarnación de Díaz, Jalisco, Viceroyalty of New Spain – 5 April 1864, Mal Paso, Zacatecas) was a Mexican politician. He served as the governor of the state of Aguascalientes from 1862 to 1863.

In 1818, he moved with his family to the city of Aguascalientes where he attended public school and learned carpentry. He gravitated toward the liberal side in politics, and was the editor of several newspapers and local magazines. He was a deputy in the local congress that promulgated the state constitution of 1857. He was elected governor on 20 October 1862. On that same date, the French intervention in Mexico occurred, and on 20 December 1863 the city of Aguascalientes was occupied by the French army and their monarchic Mexican allies. He served as part of a militia resisting the invasion and patrolled several towns bordering Zacatecas. However, the army was defeated and captured by the French in the town of Jerez. He was later condemned to die. In spite of popular petitions to pardon him, he was shot on 5 April 1864. His remains were transferred to the city of Aguascalientes in October 1865 and deposited in the central square of the city.

== See also ==
- Luis Ghilardi

== Sources ==
- Official Site of the Government of Aguascalientes:
- Álvarez, José Rogelio (Director) Article: Aguascalientes, Historia. In Enciclopedia de México. Volume 1. 1977. Mexico: Enciclopedia de México S.A.

Preceded by Ponciano Arriaga	Governor of Aguascalientes; 1862-1863	Succeeded by Juan Chávez
