= Herman Sturm =

Military leader from Indianapolis, Indiana

Herman Sturm was a prominent military leader and wealthy resident of Indianapolis, Indiana, who at one time owned the arsenal property, now the site of the Arsenal Technical Institute. General Sturm had official and personal charge of the arsenal and of the general ordnance affairs of the state as related to the fabrication of ammunition and the care and custody of large quantities of ordnance stores, including small arms, field and heavy ordnance equipment, etc., issued by the state and United States government to over 250,000 troops sent to the field and enrolled in the militia of the state of Indiana, during the American Civil War. At the close of the war, it was found that the arsenal had a large surplus of money, which was turned over to the state treasury.

== American Civil War ==
General Sturm's military career as began in Indianapolis, Indiana, on April 27, 1861, when Governor Oliver P. Morton commissioned him a captain in the Indiana Volunteers. Thereafter he was promoted to the rank of lieutenant colonel of the 54th Regiment of the Indiana Volunteer Militia on November 14, 1862, and then to Brigadier General on June 10, 1865. He also served as acting chief of ordnance.

When the first of the Indiana regiments were ready to take the field in the War of the Rebellion, they were not provided with ammunition and as none could be readily procured it was necessary to have it fabricated. For this task, Lieutenant Colonel Sturm was engaged. He had studied the art in Europe and was thoroughly instructed in all its details. From the very beginning, he was successful in this work and his ammunition was pronounced the very best in use. With the demands of the war pressing hard upon this arsenal of his making, Colonel Sturm continued to direct it and meet every emergency. Not only did he supply the State's troops with ammunition, but sent large quantities to the West and South. Herman had charge of furnishing ordnance supplies to Union armies operating in West Virginia, Kentucky, Tennessee, Missouri, and Kansas.

A few days following the end of the War of the Rebellion, Governor Oliver P. Morton empowered General Sturm to visit Washington D.C. and other points to assist with speedy return of the soldiers of Indiana.

== French intervention in Mexico ==
After the War of the Rebellion, General Sturm was appointed and acted as agent for the Republic of Mexico from May 1, 1865, to June 30, 1868. In this office, he engaged in the purchase and shipment of material necessary for the prosecution of the war of French Intervention in Mexico led by Maximilian I against Juarez. During this time he was also a secret, confidential agent for the Mexican government in the United States, rendering important political services to the Republic of Mexico. His transactions and contracts under these appointments amounted to many millions of dollars, and his services were highly commended by the President and officers of Mexico. Between 1865 and 1867, he purchased over $2,000,000 in military supplies and forwarded them to the Juarez government in Mexico. The Mexican republic and President Juarez were triumphant against Maximilian, in part because of large-scale shipments of guns and ammunition from the United States by Herman Sturm. Colonel Sturm ended his service with the department December 31, 1865, and his military record immediately made for him a place in a field of military endeavor that widened the scope of his life.

General Sturm was a member of this Loyal Legion and was remembered by many war veterans then living in Indianapolis.

== Railroad president ==
He became president of the Mexican Cuernavaca & Pacific Railway, a position he held for many years. Mexican mining ventures engaged his attention and other railroad affairs were shaped under his hand.

== Mining president ==
Around 1891, he and his family relocated from Indianapolis, Indiana, to Denver, Colorado, where he established the Vindicator Mining Company. He was one of seven original owners of the Vindicator Mine in the Cripple Creek district and amassed a considerable fortune in the mining business during the fifteen years that he lived in Colorado. Incorporated in September 1895 with 1,200,000 shares, par $1.00, principal office in Denver with General Herman Sturm, president and J. L. Frazer, secretary.

== Legacy ==
Sturm Avenue is located on the near eastside of Indianapolis, south of the arsenal property. It is approximately 0.5 miles long and runs east and west between North Highland Avenue and North Randolph Street. Prior to 1870, Herman lived on the corner of Sturm Avenue and Arsenal Avenue. His home at 1605 Sturm Avenue was razed down in 1931.

== Family ==
Sturm was born to Heinrich Melchoir Wilhelm Sturm and Justine Wilhelmine Lamprecht in Hanover, Germany on March 23, 1831, and was baptized Hermann Georg Friedrich Carl Sturm on May 1, 1831, in the Lilienthal Parish. He had seven brothers and sisters.

He immigrated from Germany to Philadelphia, Pennsylvania, when he was around 18 years old. He married Anna Lubbe on January 31, 1853, at Zion Church in Philadelphia, Pennsylvania. Together they had five children. Sometime after marrying, Herman and Anna relocated to Indianapolis, Indiana. They attended Zion Evangelical Church in the German-district of downtown Indianapolis, Indiana. Contemporaneous church records show the baptism of several of their children.

His parents immigrated to Indianapolis, Indiana, where they lived out the remainder of their lives. His father Henry Sturm died June 18, 1863, and was buried in Greenlawn Cemetery in Indianapolis, Indiana. His mother Justine died in 1864 and was buried in Greenlawn Cemetery in Indianapolis, Indiana. Both were later reinterred at Crown Hill Cemetery when Greenlawn Cemetery was decommissioned.

Anna Sturm died in Denver, Colorado, on November 24, 1903.

Sturm died of typhoid fever the morning of October 18, 1906, at the home of his son in Denver, Colorado.

Herman is buried with his wife at Fairmount Cemetery in Denver, Colorado.
