= Capture of Chihuahua (1865) =

French military conquest on behalf of the Second Mexican Empire

- Part of the Second French intervention in Mexico
Date	15 August 1865
Location	Chihuahua City, Chihuahua State, Mexico
Result	French victory

Belligerents
(France) French Empire	(Mexico) Mexican Republicans

Commanders and leaders
(France) Augustin Henri × (WIA)	Unknown

Strength
600	265

Casualties and losses
307 killed	165 killed

The Capture of Chihuahua took place on 15 August 1865, during the Second French intervention in Mexico. General Augustin Brincourt Henri, with French troops under his command, took Chihuahua City in Chihuahua State, Mexico, from the Republicans on behalf of the Second Mexican Empire.
