= Pedro José Méndez =

Mexican Army general (1836–1866)

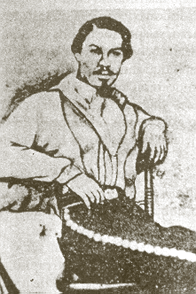
- Born: November 2, 1836; Hidalgo, Tamaulipas, Mexico
- Died: January 23, 1866 (aged 29); Tantoyuquita, Tamaulipas, Mexico
- Burial place: Rotonda de los Tamaulipecos Ilustres, Ciudad Victoria, Tamaulipas, Mexico
- Spouse: María de Jesús Moncayo (m. 1864–1866)
- Military career
- Allegiance: Mexico
- Branch: Mexican Army
- Service years: 1858 – 1866
- Rank: General
- Conflicts: Second Franco-Mexican War; Occupation of Tampico; Battle of Ciudad Victoria; Battle of Tula; Battle of El Chamal; Battle of Cuesta de Canton

Pedro José Méndez Ortiz (1836–1866) was a Mexican general who was from the state of Tamaulipas. He led a group of guerrillas called "Fieles de Hidalgo" during the Second French intervention in Mexico.

== Childhood ==
Pedro José Méndez Ortiz was born on November 22, 1836, at the San Agustín hacienda, located in the municipality of Hidalgo, Tamaulipas, Mexico. His parents were the landowner Don Pedro J. Méndez and his wife Doña Agapita Ortiz. Méndez began his studies at the age of six in a primary school in Ciudad Victoria. At sixteen, Pedro J. Méndez lost his father, forcing him to return to country life to aid his family.

== Coup d'état ==
In 1858, President Ignacio Comonfort's coup d'état was taking place in Mexico and with the formation of the Liberal and Conservative parties there were those who sought to suppress the newly sworn Federal Constitution of the United Mexican States of 1857. Pedro José Méndez always showed loyalty to President Benito Juárez and to the Constitution.

== French intervention ==
On November 23, 1862, the Imperial French Army entered the port of Tampico. With the help of General Macedonio Capistrán de la Garza, Pedro J. Méndez forced the French to evacuate the port on January 18, 1863, and Méndez was promoted Lieutenant for this.

On February 24, 1864, Méndez married María de Jesús Moncayo in Ciudad Victoria and later they would move to his hacienda. On March 1, a secret communication was received from General García to the then Governor of Nuevo León, Santiago Vidaurri, in which both agreed to surrender to the French troops. To prevent this from happening, Méndez returned to Ciudad Victoria and forced General García to flee and chose Colonel Julián Cerda as interim governor. President Juárez, learning of Méndez's heroic action, gave him the command of the liberal troops of Ciudad Victoria and Linares.

Shortly after, Méndez joined the “Corps of the Faithful”. He hid as he hid his mother and wife from battle by putting them in a safe place as he went off into battle.

On April 15, 1865, he attacked Ciudad Victoria. On June 4 of the same year, he took Tula after four hours at the Battle of Tula and on July 15, he evacuated Commander Valée from Santa Bárbara. For these important triumphs for the national army, President Juárez awarded him the rank of General. In December 1865, he achieved one of his most important triumphs at the Battle of El Chamal and the Battle of Cuesta de Cantón.

== Death ==
On January 23, 1866, in Tantoyuquita Tamaulipas, when seizing a convoy valued at $200,000.00 from the enemies, Pedro J. Méndez was shot in the chest. "They have killed me, don't lose heart" he told Pedro Mata and pointing to the French he concluded "There is the road!" Méndez died on January 22 or 23 1866 at the age of 29. His remains now rest in the Rotonda de los Tamaulipecos Ilustres in Ciudad Victoria.
