= Second French intervention in Mexico =

1861 invasion of Mexico by the French

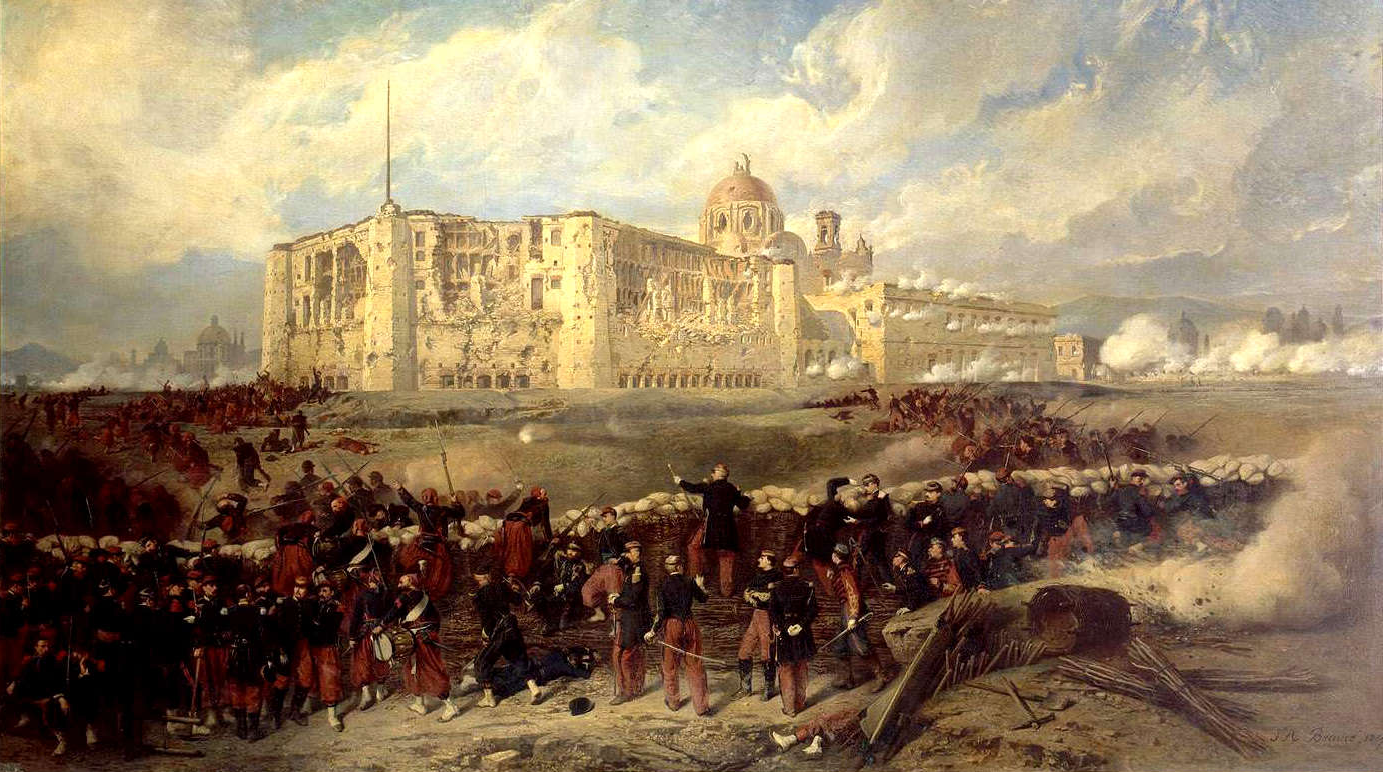
- General Bazaine Attacks Fort San Xavier During the Siege of Puebla by Jean-Adolphe Beaucé, 1867
Date	8 December 1861 – 21 June 1867 (5 years, 6 months, 1 week and 6 days)
Location	Mexico
Result	Republican victory

Belligerents
Mexican Republic	France; Mexican Empire

Commanders and leaders
(Second Federal Republic of Mexico) Benito Juárez; (Second Federal Republic of Mexico) Porfirio Díaz; (Second Federal Republic of Mexico) Ignacio Zaragoza #; (Second Federal Republic of Mexico) Jesús González Ortega; (Second Federal Republic of Mexico) Ignacio Comonfort †; (Second Federal Republic of Mexico) José María Arteaga (executed); (Second Federal Republic of Mexico) Carlos Salazar Ruiz (executed); (Second Federal Republic of Mexico) Miguel Negrete; (Second Federal Republic of Mexico) Antonio Rojas †; (Second Federal Republic of Mexico) Mariano Escobedo; (Second Federal Republic of Mexico) Jerónimo Treviño; (Second Federal Republic of Mexico) Pedro José Méndez †; (Second Federal Republic of Mexico) Vicente Riva Palacio; (Second Federal Republic of Mexico) Tomás O'Horán (1862–1863); (Second Federal Republic of Mexico) José López Uraga (1862–1864); (Second Federal Republic of Mexico) Luigi Ghilardi (executed)	(Second French Empire) Napoleon III; (Second French Empire) Francois Achille Bazaine; (Second French Empire) Élie Frédéric Forey; (Second French Empire) Félix Douay; (Second French Empire) Auguste Henri Brincourt (surrendered); Pierre Joseph Jeanningros; (Second French Empire) Armand de Catagny; (Second French Empire) Georges Cloué; Maximilian I (executed); (Second Mexican Empire) Juan Almonte; (Second Mexican Empire) Santiago Vidaurri (executed); (Second Mexican Empire) Tomás Mejía (executed); (Second Mexican Empire) Miguel Miramón (executed); (Second Mexican Empire) Leonardo Márquez (surrendered); (Second Mexican Empire) Refugio Tánori (executed); (Second Mexican Empire) Manuel Lozada (1865–1866); (Second Mexican Empire) Ramón Méndez (executed); (Second Mexican Empire) Tomás O'Horán (executed) (1863–1867); (Second Mexican Empire) José López Uraga (surrendered) (1864–1867)

Strength
(Second Federal Republic of Mexico) 70,000	(Second French Empire) 38,493; (Second Mexican Empire) 16,200–24,000

Casualties and losses
31,962 killed (including 11,000 executed); 8,304 wounded; 33,281 captured	14,000 dead

The second French intervention in Mexico (Spanish: segunda intervención francesa en México), also known as the Second Franco-Mexican War (1861–1867), was a military invasion of the Republic of Mexico by the French Empire of Napoleon III, purportedly to force the collection of Mexican debts in conjunction with Great Britain and Spain (the first, known as the Pastry War, was in 1838-1839). Mexican conservatives supported the invasion, since they had been defeated by the liberal government of Benito Juárez in a three-year civil war. Defeated on the battlefield, conservatives sought the aid of France to effect regime change and establish a monarchy in Mexico, a plan that meshed with Napoleon III's plans to re-establish the presence of the French Empire in the Americas. Although the French invasion displaced Juárez's Republican government from the Mexican capital and the monarchy of Archduke Maximilian was established, the Second Mexican Empire collapsed within a few years. Material aid from the United States, whose four-year civil war ended in 1865, invigorated the Republican fight against the regime of Maximilian, and the 1866 decision of Napoleon III to withdraw military support for Maximilian's regime accelerated the monarchy's collapse.

The intervention came as a civil war, the Reform War, had just concluded, and the intervention allowed the Conservative opposition against the liberal social and economic reforms of President Juárez to take up their cause once again. The Catholic Church, conservatives, much of the upper-class and Mexican nobility, and some indigenous communities invited, welcomed and collaborated with the French empire to install Maximilian as Emperor of Mexico. However, there was still significant support for republicanism in Mexico. Mexican society was most resistant to European models of governance, including monarchies, during and after the French intervention. The emperor himself however proved to be of liberal inclination and continued some of the Juárez government's most notable measures. Some liberal generals defected to the empire, including the powerful, northern governor Santiago Vidaurri, who had fought on the side of Juárez during the Reform War.

The French army landed in January 1862, aiming to rapidly take the capital of Mexico City, but Mexican republican forces defeated them in the Battle of Puebla on 5 May 1862 ("Cinco de Mayo"), delaying their march on the capital for a year. The French and Mexican Imperial Army captured much of Mexican territory, including major cities, but guerrilla warfare by republicans remained a significant factor and Juárez himself never left the national territory. The intervention was increasingly using up troops and money at a time when the recent Prussian victory over Austria was inclining France to give greater military priority to European affairs. The liberals also never lost the official recognition of the United States of America in spite of their ongoing civil war, and following the defeat and surrender of the Confederate States of America in April 1865 the reunited country began providing material support to the republicans. Invoking the Monroe Doctrine, the U.S. government asserted that it would not tolerate a lasting French presence on the continent. Facing a mounting combination of domestic political discontent, diplomatic pressure and the growing military threat of Prussia on the borders of Metropolitan France itself, French units in Mexico began to redeploy to Europe in 1866. Without substantial French support, the Second Mexican Empire collapsed in 1867. Maximilian and the two conservative generals Miguel Miramón and Tomás Mejía were executed by firing squad on 19 June 1867, ending this period of Mexican history.

== Background ==
Some Mexican conservatives had hopes of restoring Mexico to a monarchical form of government, as it had been pre-independence and at its inception in 1821, the First Mexican Empire of Agustín I. Through his Spanish wife, empress Eugénie de Montijo, the French emperor Napoleon III came into contact with monarchist exiles José María Gutiérrez de Estrada and José Manuel Hidalgo y Esnaurrízar, who exposed him to their decades long effort to import a European prince to ascend a Mexican throne. Napoleon III was initially not interested, due to the inevitable opposition that the effort would invite from the United States, but the outbreak of the American Civil War provided an opportunity. After the Mexican–American War, the country was weakened and politically fragmented. Power was divided between central and peripheral elites, and elite rebellions, secessionist attempts, and major uprisings by opposition factions were recurrent under both federalist and centralist constitutions. The 1857 coup led by conservative forces that deposed President Ignacio Comonfort deepened the instability, leaving Mexico trapped in a virtual stalemate between rival elites. Only the eventual victory over the French would end this cycle of endemic political anarchy in Mexico.

Napoleon III would also claim that the military adventure was a foreign policy commitment to free trade and that the establishment of a European-derived monarchy in Mexico would ensure European access to Mexican resources, particularly French access to Mexican silver. However, his choice emperor Maximilian would later disagree on Mexican resources going to anyone but Mexicans. More importantly, a French-dependent Mexico would restrain the growing power of the United States, and replace it with French influence in Mexico and the rest of Latin America.

The support for monarchism in Mexico would also inspire strong resistance against European visions of modernity which were frequently accompanied or driven by imperial campaigns. Many Mexicans would question claims to power and the use of gruesome militaristic violence as a means to progress civilization.

=== Multinational intervention ===
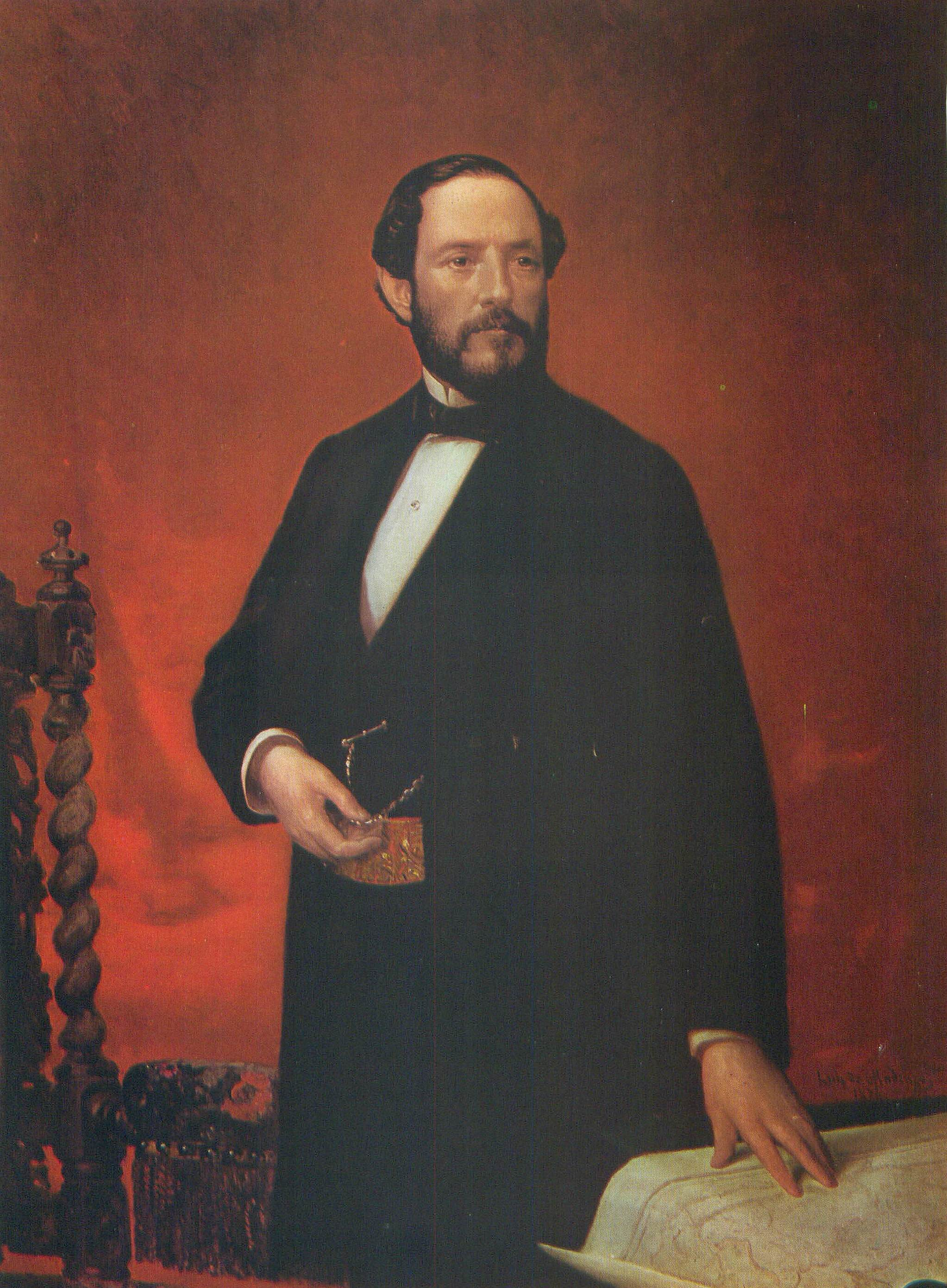
Juan Prim, who was later Prime Minister of Spain

The pretext for intervention came in July 1861, when Mexican president Benito Juárez placed a moratorium on foreign debt payments and expelled all Spanish diplomats from the country, accusing Spain of having supported the Conservatives in the Reform War. In response, Spain, France, and a reluctant United Kingdom agreed to the Convention of London to ensure that debt repayments would be forthcoming. On 14 December, Spanish general Juan Prim occupied Mexico's main port, Veracruz, with 6,200 Spanish soldiers from Cuba. 2,000 French and 700 British forces joined them on 7 January 1862. Historians have considered Prim, who was given powers as minister plenipotentiary to negotiate with the Mexican government, an unusual choice to lead the intervention. While well-regarded by the people and in military circles for his experience as governor of Puerto Rico, observer in the Crimean War, and leader in the Moroccan War, he was also of liberal tendency and married to a Mexican citizen, Francisca de Agüero, who was related to a member of Juárez's government.

On 10 January, Prim issued a manifesto disavowing rumors that the allies had come to conquer or to impose a new government. It was emphasized that the three powers merely wanted to open negotiations regarding their claims of damages. On 14 January, a bill of claims was presented to the government in Mexico City. Foreign Minister Manuel Doblado invited the commissioners to travel to Orizaba with two thousand of their own troops for a conference while requesting that the rest of the tripartite forces embark from Veracruz. The proposal to embark most troops was rejected, but negotiations then resulted in an agreement, ratified on 23 January, to move the forces inland and hold the conference at Orizaba. The agreement also officially recognized the government of Juárez along with Mexican sovereignty.

On 9 April, agreements at Orizaba between the allies broke down, as France made increasingly clear that it intended to invade Mexico and interfere in its government in violation of previous treaties. Prim consulted with the British and the two armies agreed to retire from Mexico after securing that 80% of custom revenues passing through Veracruz would be used to settle debts with foreign nations. Though the British and Spanish agreed to depart at the same time, the general perception was that Prim had precipitated the issue and decided, without the Spanish government's authorization, to put an end to what had been a Spanish-led project from the beginning.

Prim's decision angered France, who had counted on Spanish support to ease their conquest of Mexico, much like how the French were being helped by Spanish forces and bases in the Philippines in their ongoing conquest of Cochinchina. It also angered the Spanish Captain-General of Cuba Francisco Serrano, who refused to provide Prim with additional ships for the evacuation, and Spanish conservatives who saw the affair as Prim abandoning a former Spanish colony, betraying Spain's allies and Mexican conservatives sympathetic to Spain. Prime Minister Leopoldo O'Donnell was ambivalent. He did not want to alienate the French, but he didn't like their plan to install an Austrian monarch in Mexico, because the Austrian Empire had supported the Carlists during the First Carlist War and had been one of the last European states to recognize Isabel II as queen of Spain. "France was an ally of Spain, but Austria was not." Likewise the queen, who had long hoped to install one of her own relatives as monarch in Mexico, prohibited O'Donnell to take any disciplinary action against Prim.

== French invasion ==
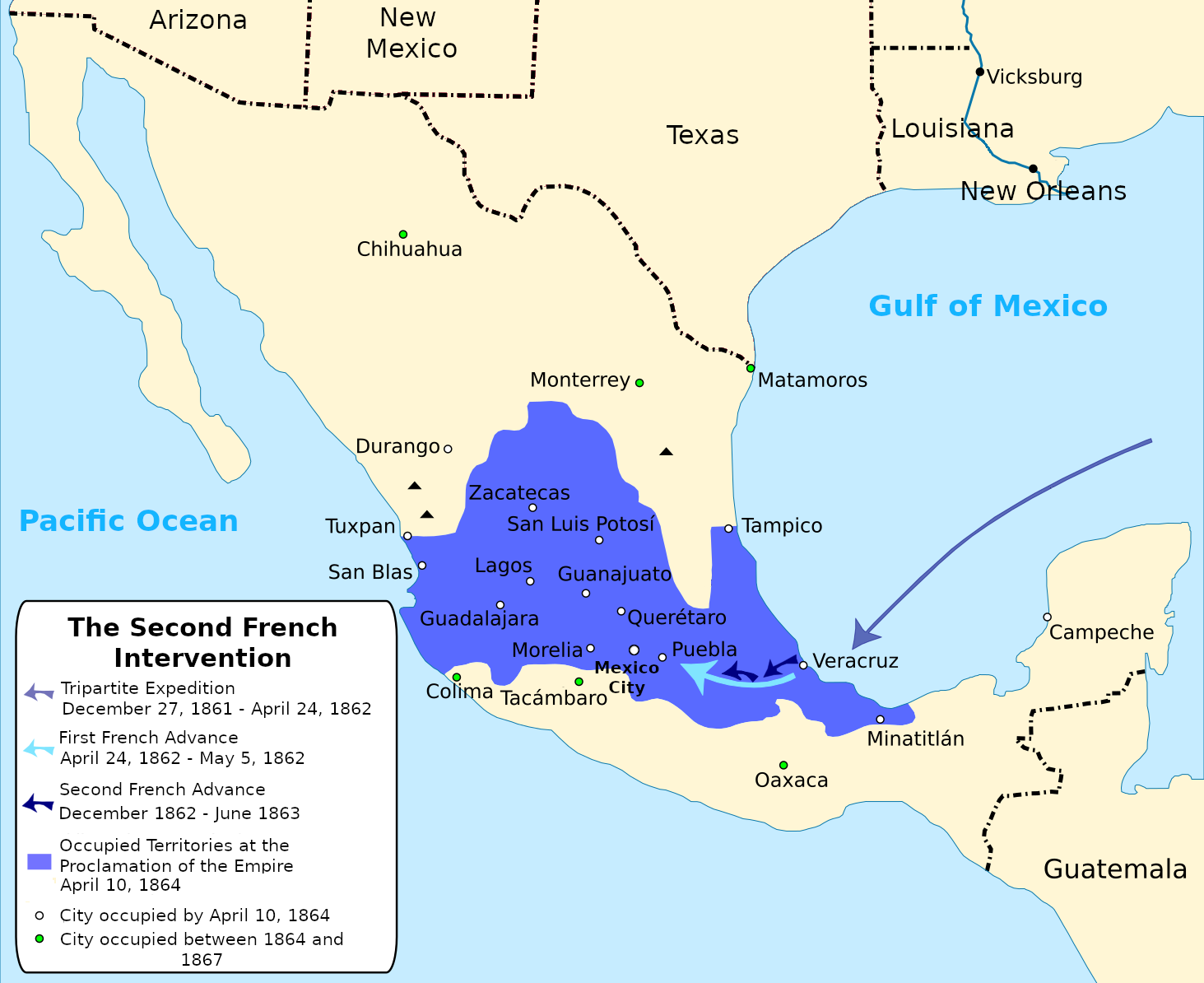
Map of the Intervention. In blue, territory controlled by the Empire of Mexico upon Maximillian's arrival in Mexico City.

On 11 April, Minister Doblado made it known to the remaining occupant, the French government, that its intentions would lead to war. Certain Mexican officers had been sympathetic to the Europeans since the beginning of the intervention. On 16 April, the French issued a proclamation inviting Mexicans to join them in establishing a new government. The next day, Mexican general Juan Almonte, who had been foreign minister of the conservative government defeated in the Reform War, and who was brought back to Mexico by the French, issued his own manifesto, assuring the Mexican people of benevolent French intentions.

A French force of 6,500 men began advancing toward Mexico City in early 1862. The French defeated a small Mexican force at Escamela and captured Orizaba. Mexican Generals Porfirio Díaz and Ignacio Zaragoza retreated to El Ingenio, north of Orizaba, and headed towards Puebla. Almonte now attempted to consolidate the Mexican pro-French movement. The town council of Orizaba joined him and so did Veracruz and Isla del Carmen. Colonel Gonzáles, Manuel Castellanos, Desiderio Samaniego, Father Miranda, Haro Tamariz, and General Antonio Taboada arrived in Orizaba to support Almonte. On 28 April, French forces headed towards Puebla.

On 5 May, Mexican forces commanded by Ignacio Zaragoza and Porfirio Díaz won a major victory against the French at the Battle of Puebla, in which a Mexican force of about 5,000 men confronted 6,000 French troops as they tried to climb steep terrain towards the city. Although costly, the Mexican defense of the Cerro de Guadalupe became a symbolic victory. The French suffered 476 casualties against 227 Mexican losses. This triumph strengthened President Benito Juárez’s political position, attracted some conservative officers to the republican cause, and stirred a new sense of national unity and resistance. The French retreated to Orizaba to await reinforcements, pausing their push to capture Mexico City and delaying the French conquest campaign for a year. The celebration of Cinco de Mayo commemorates the Mexican victory.

Nevertheless, conservative Mexican Generals Florentino López, Leonardo Márquez, and Juan Vicario still sought to join the French, and Mexican republicans suffered defeats at Barranca Seca and Cerro del Borrego in the vicinity of Orizaba.

In response to the French defeat at Puebla, Napoleon III sent 30,000 troops under the command of Élie Frédéric Forey on July. The Emperor gave Forey instructions laying out France's occupation policy, directing him to work with Mexican supporters in the pursuit of both military and political goals. The aim was to establish a new government friendly to French interests, and preventing the United States from becoming too powerful in the Americas was also emphasized. Forey reached Orizaba on 24 October 1862, and began planning another siege of Puebla, the defense of which had now passed on to Jesús González Ortega after Zaragoza died of typhoid on 8 September.

On 10 January 1863, a French squadron bombarded the Pacific port of Acapulco and on 3 February, Forey finally set out for Puebla. González Ortega had been building up the town's fortifications, and on 10 March he declared martial law. The French arrived on 16 March and began the Siege of Puebla.

On 8 May, François Achille Bazaine and Leonardo Márquez defeated a force of new recruits under former Mexican president Ignacio Comonfort at the Battle of San Lorenzo, when he was coming to reinforce Puebla. Comonfort then retreated to Mexico City. Having run out of munitions and food, González Ortega held a council of war and agreed to surrender on 17 May, after destroying the remaining armaments. All officers were taken prisoner and intended to be transported to France, but González Ortega and Porfirio Díaz managed to escape.

=== Proclamation of the empire and international recognition ===
Upon hearing of the fall of Puebla, President Juárez directed the government to evacuate Mexico City and move to San Luis Potosí. Congress closed its session on 31 May after granting Juárez emergency powers.

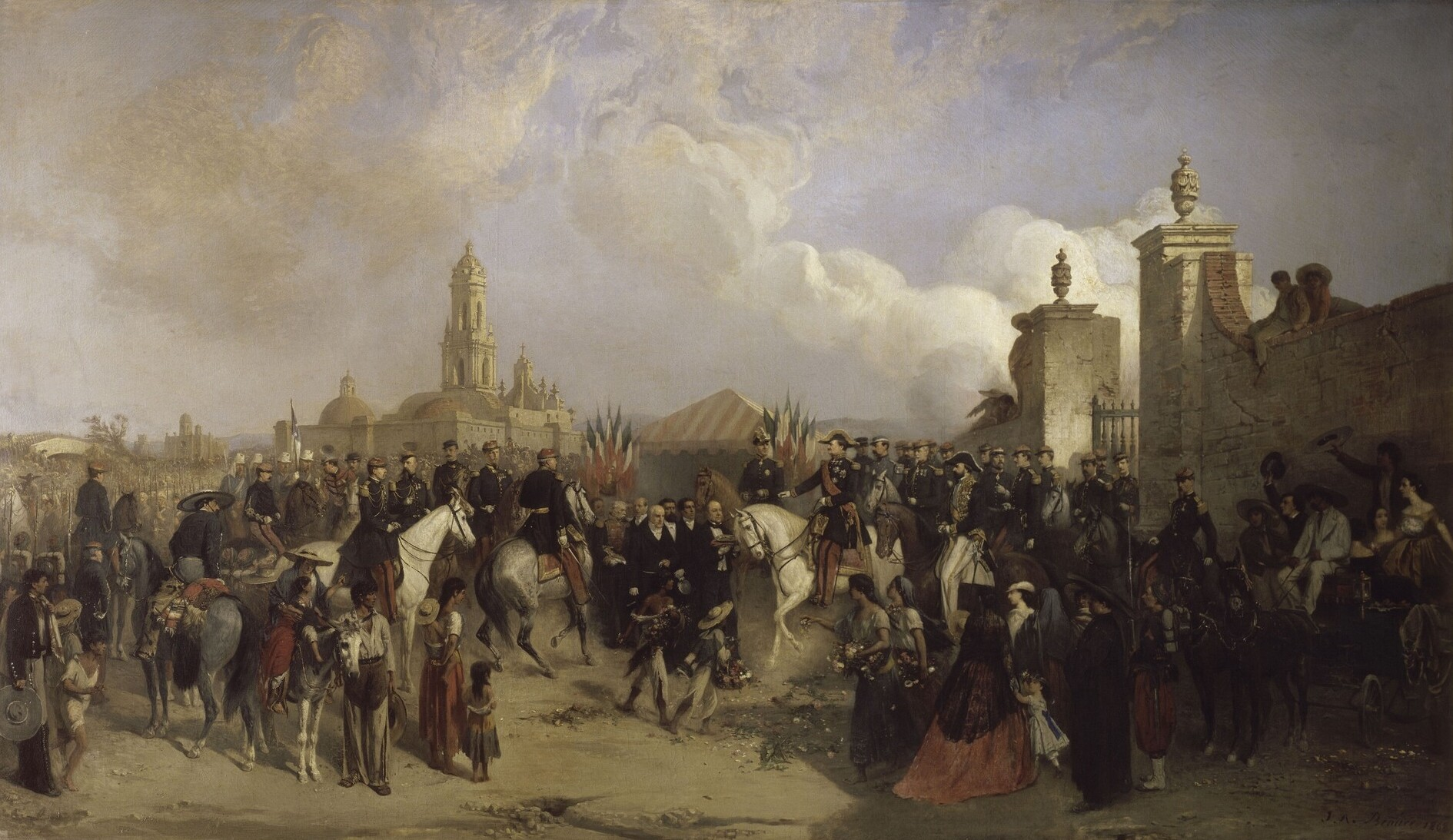
Entry of the French Expeditionary Force into Mexico City by Jean-Adolphe Beaucé, 1868

Following the French occupation of Mexico City on 10 June 1863, the Mexican conservative elites were forced to align more closely with the French. On 16 June the French nominated 35 Mexican citizens to constitute a Junta Superior de Gobierno who was tasked with electing a triumvirate that was to serve as the executive of the new government. The three selected were General Almonte, Archbishop Labastida, and José Mariano Salas. The Junta was also to choose 215 Mexican citizens who together with the Junta Superior were to constitute an Assembly of Notables that was to decide upon the form of government. On 11 July, the Assembly resolved that Mexico was to be a constitutional monarchy and that the Austrian archduke Ferdinand Maximilian was to be invited to accept the Mexican throne. The executive was then officially changed to the Regency of the Mexican Empire. However at the same time, the intervening army directed generals Élie Forey and Achille Bazaine to centralize power and delay broader conservative reforms.

The new monarchy was recognized in succession by the European countries of France, Austria, Belgium, Prussia, Portugal, Spain, Russia, the Netherlands, Switzerland, the United Kingdom, and the Ottoman Empire. Uncommonly for the era, Maximilian was recognized both by the Papal States and by the Kingdom of Italy; the latter wanted to maintain good relations with France and put diplomatic pressure on Austria, which had not yet recognized Italy. It was also hoped that Maximilian, as former Viceroy of the Kingdom of Lombardy-Venetia, would mediate the Italian acquisition of Veneto.

In the Americas, only Guatemala under the conservative president for life Rafael Carrera, and the monarchist Empire of Brazil extended recognition. The United States, Honduras, Nicaragua, Costa Rica, El Salvador, Chile, Bolivia, Colombia, Venezuela, Ecuador, Peru, Uruguay, and Argentina all refused to recognize the monarchy and made declarations of support for the Juárez government. El Salvador, Chile, and Bolivia requested US intervention, and the latter two, offered to join in themselves. The Peruvian diplomatic legation in Mexico City including ambassador Manuel Nicolás Corpancho was expelled from the country, and perished in a fortuitous fire aboard the Spanish steamer México on 10 september 1863, while sailing from Veracruz to Havana.

Prior to accepting the crown and departing for Mexico in 1864, Maximilian expressed his desire for a mutual recognition and alliance with the breakaway Confederate States of America, which was reciprocated by the latter, but was prevented by the French government which feared being dragged into war with the United States because of it.

=== Conquest of Central Mexico ===
Although Republican guerrillas in the countryside around the capital counted no victories against the French, they maintained a presence. Cuernavaca, Pachuca, and Tulancingo were captured by Franco-imperial forces in July. Guerrilla commanders Catarino Fragoso, León Ugalde, and others continued to wage warfare against towns occupied by the French.

Juan Chávez under the command of Tomás Mejía defeated the Republican forces of Tomás O'Horán on the road to Guanajuato. O'Horan would then switch sides and join the imperialists. Colonel José Antonio Rodríguez then captured San Juan de los Llanos in Puebla. The Mexican Gulf port of Tampico was captured by the French Navy on 11 August. By October, advancing combined forces were spreading across the central regions of Mexico from Jalisco to San Luis Potosí and Oaxaca.

In August, Mejía captured Actopan, Hidalgo. Imperialist commander Gavito managed to disperse republican guerrillas in Cuayuca, and Jesús María Visoso defeated Republican guerrillas at Puebla.

Franco-Mexican forces under Leonardo Márquez and de Berthier entered Morelia, Michoacan unopposed on 30 November, after Republicans evacuated the city. After reinforcements arrived, the Republicans led by José López Uraga attempted to recapture Morelia but were defeated by Márquez.

Mejía captured Querétaro on 17 November, while Republican forces retreated further north to Guanajuato. Imperialist forces pursued them and Guanajuato was taken on 9 December.

On 22 December, the Republican government evacuated San Luis Potosí and intended to relocate north to the state of Coahuila. Mejía captured the city on 25 December, facing a Republican assault on 27 December, which was defeated.

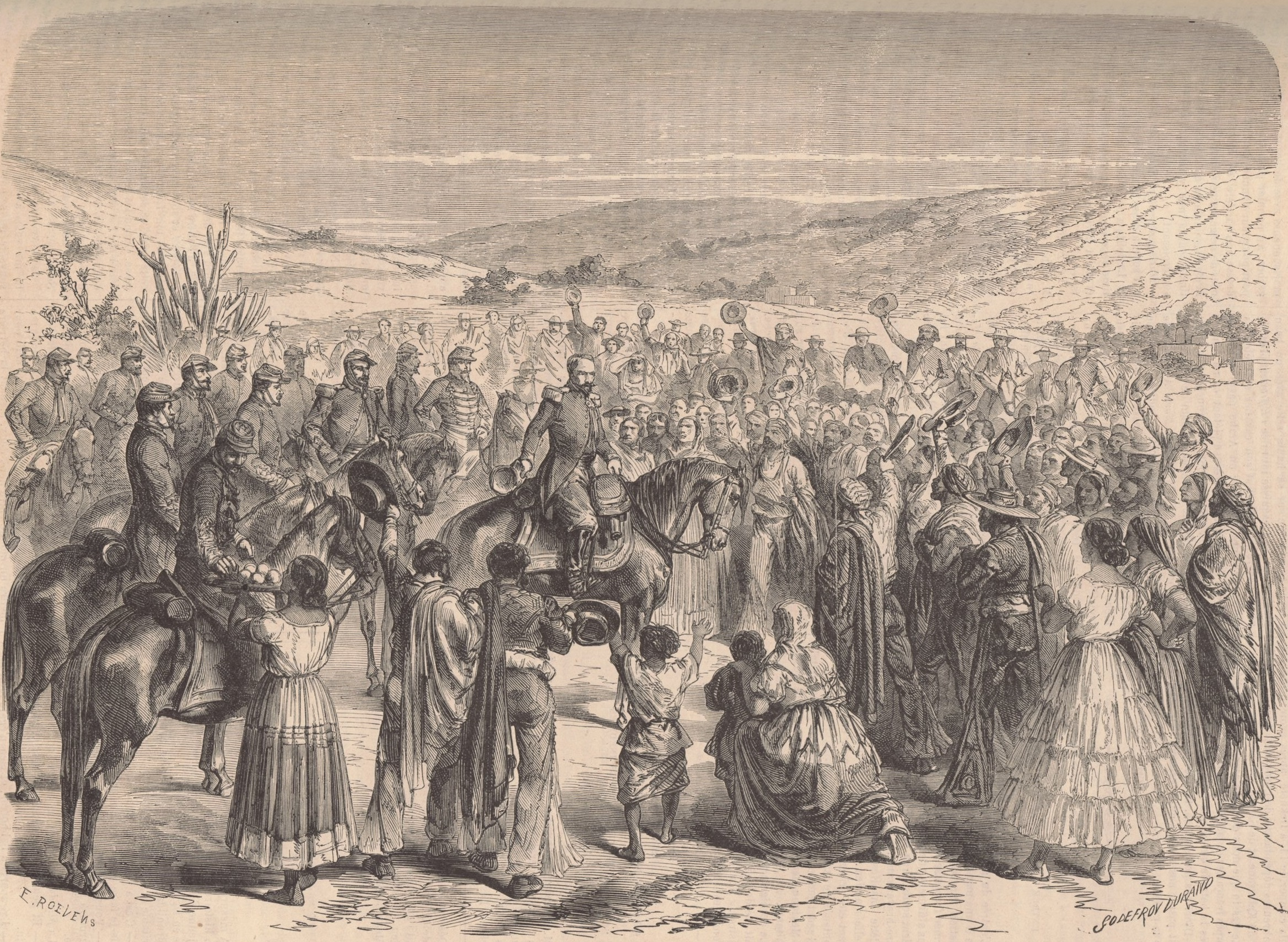
Bazaine welcomed to Guadalajara

Bazaine occupied Guadalajara on 5 January 1864. The liberal generals José López Uraga and Jesús González Ortega remained in the vicinity but carried no attacks. After French assaults led by Félix Douay, González Ortega retreated towards Fresnillo, and Uraga westward.

General Felipe Navarrete proclaimed his support for the empire in Yucatan and attacked the state capital of Mérida with the support of French forces, capturing it on 22 January 1864.

Generals Douay and Armand Alexandre de Castagny headed north, capturing Aguascalientes and Zacatecas by 7 February. Castagny was left in charge of Zacatecas, while Douay went to the relief of Colonel Garnier in Guadalajara. On 16 February, Castagny won a battle at Colotlán in which he took eighty prisoners and Republican General Luigi Ghilardi was executed. The Republican governor of Aguascalientes, General José María Chávez Alonso was also executed after being captured in Jerez.

Imperialists struggled to hold on to the southern state of Chiapas. The nearby state capital of Tabasco, Villahermosa was recaptured by Republicans on 27 February. The success inspired a republican incursion to Veracruz, capturing Minatitlán on 28 March.

On 19 March, the western Mexican commander Manuel Lozada, at the head of indigenous troops of the Tepic district sided with the imperialists.

Douay headed south, pursuing the Republican guerrillas of Simón Gutiérrez and Antonio Rojas, routing the former, and destroying two factories of arms and powder near Cocula. In March, Douay entered Colima.

González Ortega and several guerrilla bands were driven back into the Sierra Hermosa after Manuel Doblado was repulsed by Mejía in his attempted assault on Monterrey. Doblado fled for the United States and died a year later. Mejía was subsequently granted the cross of the Legion of Honour by Napoleon III.

Maximilian and his wife Charlotte of Belgium arrived in Veracruz in the summer of 1864 and were later crowned in the Mexico City Metropolitan Cathedral.

Porfirio Díaz defeated the imperialist Marcos Toledo at the silver mining town of Taxco on 26 October 1864. Díaz then besieged the brigade of Juan Vicario in Iguala until imperialist reinforcements forced him to abandon the siege. Díaz headed south to his home state of Oaxaca and increased his troops to eight thousand.

The Imperialists now controlled the central Mexican states, their major cities, two thirds of the population, mines and agricultural lands, and the main centers of manufacturing and trade. The Republicans controlled the sparsely populated frontier states of the north, where Juárez led from Monterrey. These northern states granted them revenue coming into the Pacific ports of Manzanillo, Mazatlán, and Guaymas. Arms also flowed in from the U.S. states of California and Texas, along with mercenaries. The Republicans also held the southern states of Guerrero, Oaxaca, Tabasco, and Chiapas, under the command of Porfirio Díaz.

=== Northern campaign ===
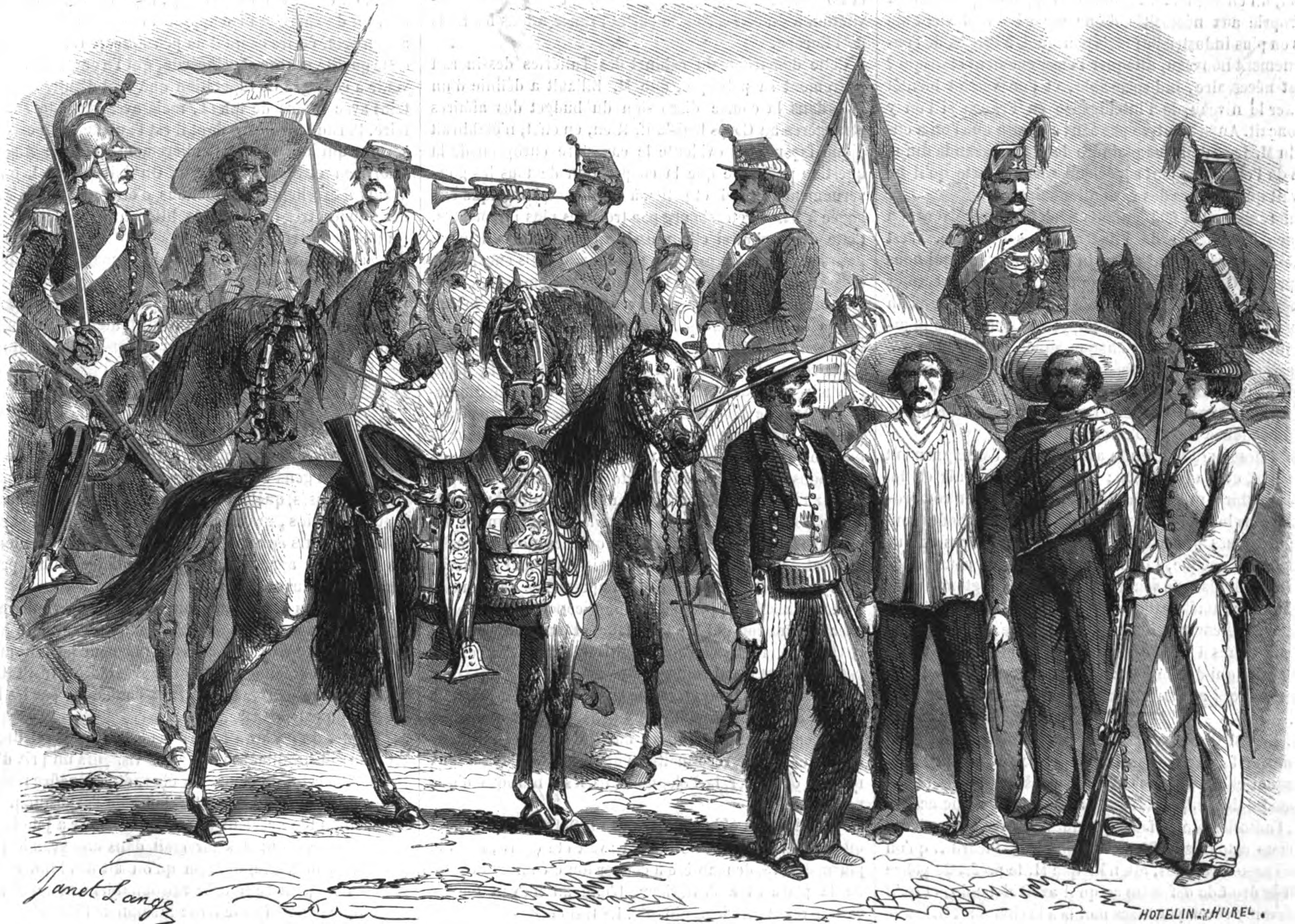
Soldiers of the Imperial Mexican Army

The Imperialists now focused on capturing the north, with Mejía campaigning along the northern Gulf Coast, supported by Charles-Louis Du Pin's anti-guerrilla corps at Tampico and Édouard Aymard's brigade at San Luis Potosí. Castagny supported the rear, and the entire operation was headquartered at Querétaro.

On the Pacific, a naval squadron under Thomas Louis Le Normant de Kergrist was ready to cooperate with Douay in Jalisco and push towards Sinaloa. They were aided by quarrels within the Republican leadership that resulted in José López Uraga being demoted and subsequently joining the Imperialists. On 26 September 1864, the Imperialists captured Bagdad, Tamaulipas, controlling every major port in the Gulf. The commander at Bagdad, Juan Cortina, defected to the Imperialists.

Santiago Vidaurri, the joint governor of Nuevo León and Coahuila, had broken with Juárez in March 1864 over the administration and finances of his state, and even held a referendum on joining the empire. Republican troops drove him into Texas, but Viduarri loyalist troops remained in the region. As Republican forces in the north were diverted by Imperial advances, Vidaurri's forces captured Monterrey on 15 August, with Juárez barely escaping and pursued as far as Parras in a bullet-riddled carriage. Vidaurri then headed towards Mexico City where he was made a councilor of Emperor Maximilian. By the end of the year the imperialists controlled Nuevo León and the greater part of Coahuila to the banks of the Rio Grande.

=== Pacific campaign ===
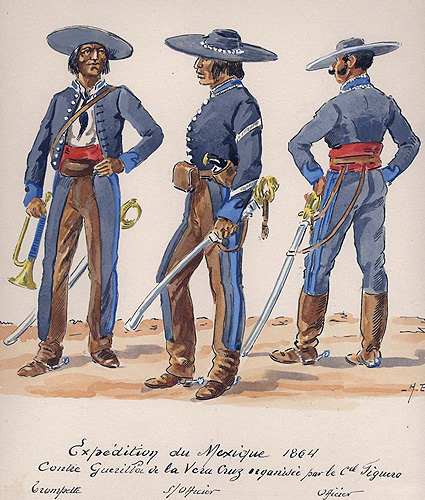
Mexican Imperial counter-guerrilla forces who were commanded by Charles Dupin.

On 28 October 1864, Márquez and Douay attacked the army of José María Arteaga in the ravine of Atenquique, routing him. A few days later, the guerrillas of Simón Gutiérrez and Antonio Rojas were defeated near the U.S. border by General Carlos Rivas with French support. Márquez occupied Colima and by 18 November, Márquez had captured the port of Manzanillo.

On 12 November 1864, de Kergrist's fleet arrived at Mazatlán and demanded surrender under threat of bombardment. At the same time, the Manuel Lozada besieged the town leading to its capture.

Juan Vicario was repulsed at Chilapa de Álvarez, while on the way to replace the French garrison in the Pacific port of Acapulco, and subsequently the port had to be evacuated and left to the Republicans in December. French vessels succeeded in recapturing Acapulco on 11 September.

The Imperialists hoped to dislodge Porfirio Díaz from his stronghold in the south, and began to survey the land and build roads. Towards the end of 1864, General Courtois d'Hurbal entered Oaxaca by way of Santo Domingo Yanhuitlán and other columns followed from Orizaba and Mexico City. Díaz was based in Oaxaca City with three thousand regulars, three thousand troops in the mountains, and had fortified the city.

Bazaine decided to lead the siege of Oaxaca in person and by the end of January 1865, the besieging forces numbered seven thousand men. The use of artillery began on 4 February, and an assault was ordered on February 9th. The massing of forces produced panic among the besieged and Díaz surrendered. Díaz was imprisoned at Puebla, but he escaped again after seven months and raised an army in Guerrero. This prompted Élie Frédéric Forey, the former Commander of French forces in Mexico, to criticize Bazaine for not executing Díaz. The defector José López Uraga sent a letter to Díaz hoping to win him over to the imperialist cause, arguing that guerrilla warfare was devastating the country and assuring him that Mexican independence was secure under Maximilian. Díaz rejected this offer.

French colonel Mangin remained at Oaxaca and reorganized the civilian government. Imperialist forces would continue to face sporadic conflict with Republicans led by General Luis Pérez Figueroa.

Michoacan continued to be a Republican stronghold, serving as a base for Nicolás Régules, Manuel García Pueblita, Carlos Salazar Ruiz, and Vicente Riva Palacio, with the latter being named governor by Arteaga who held supreme command of the regional forces after Díaz's capture. On 31 January, Nicolás Romero was defeated at Apatzingán by Colonel Poiter. On 19 May, Salazar defeated a Franco-Mexican force at Los Reyes. Arteaga occupied Tacámbaro, and León Ugalde and Fermín Valdés captured Zitácuaro. Régules ventured into Guanajuato, then back to Michoacan where he recaptured Tacámbaro on 11 April, where the imperialists lost a significant number of Belgian mercenaries. The town however was soon taken back. Régules once again ventured towards Morelia but was stopped at Huaniqueo by Potier.

In Jalisco, Douay's operations resulted in guerrilla commander Antonio Rojas being killed on 28 January 1865 at Potrerillos. The operations led by Douay and Manuel Lozada resulted in the defection of the commander of the Republican Central Forces Miguel María de Echegaray, along with General Rómulo Valle.

In January 1865, Castagny went to Mazatlán to follow up on the Imperialist victory there from the previous November. Fierce warfare ensued with General Ramón Corona and Lozada was sent to aid Castagny resulting in the Imperialist victory at El Rosario in April, 1865. Corona fled north but returned in September with a victory at Mazatlán.

The success at Mazatlán allowed the imperialists to turn their attention towards the northwest coast, with Castagny hoping to capture Guaymas. A French squadron landed several hundred men under Colonel Garnier on 29 March. Garnier sent troops by sea to Álamos and managed to gain support among the native Yaqui, Mayo, and Opata peoples. The Opata chief Refugio Tánori arrived at Guaymas with reinforcements, which helped the imperialists win the Battle of Álamos on 24 September, and subsequently proceed to Hermosillo.

== Republican counteroffensive ==
The effective Union victory in the American Civil War in April 1865 marked a turning point in the French intervention. U.S. President Abraham Lincoln never recognized the government of Maximilian but could not aid the Republican cause in Mexico until his own war ended. Mexican Republicans were hopeful that surplus arms and Union troops would aid them.

Lincoln was assassinated shortly after major hostilities in the American Civil War ended. His successor, Andrew Johnson, never considered overt U.S. intervention, but he did not stop the flow of demobilized Civil War veterans heading south to volunteer for the Republicans.

Maximilian received a message from the Juárez government advising him to leave the country while he could. Juárez was now confident of his victory, writing that "the United States will never permit [Maximilian] to consolidate his power, and his sacrifices and victories will have counted for nothing."

=== Continued Northern campaign and "Black Decree" ===
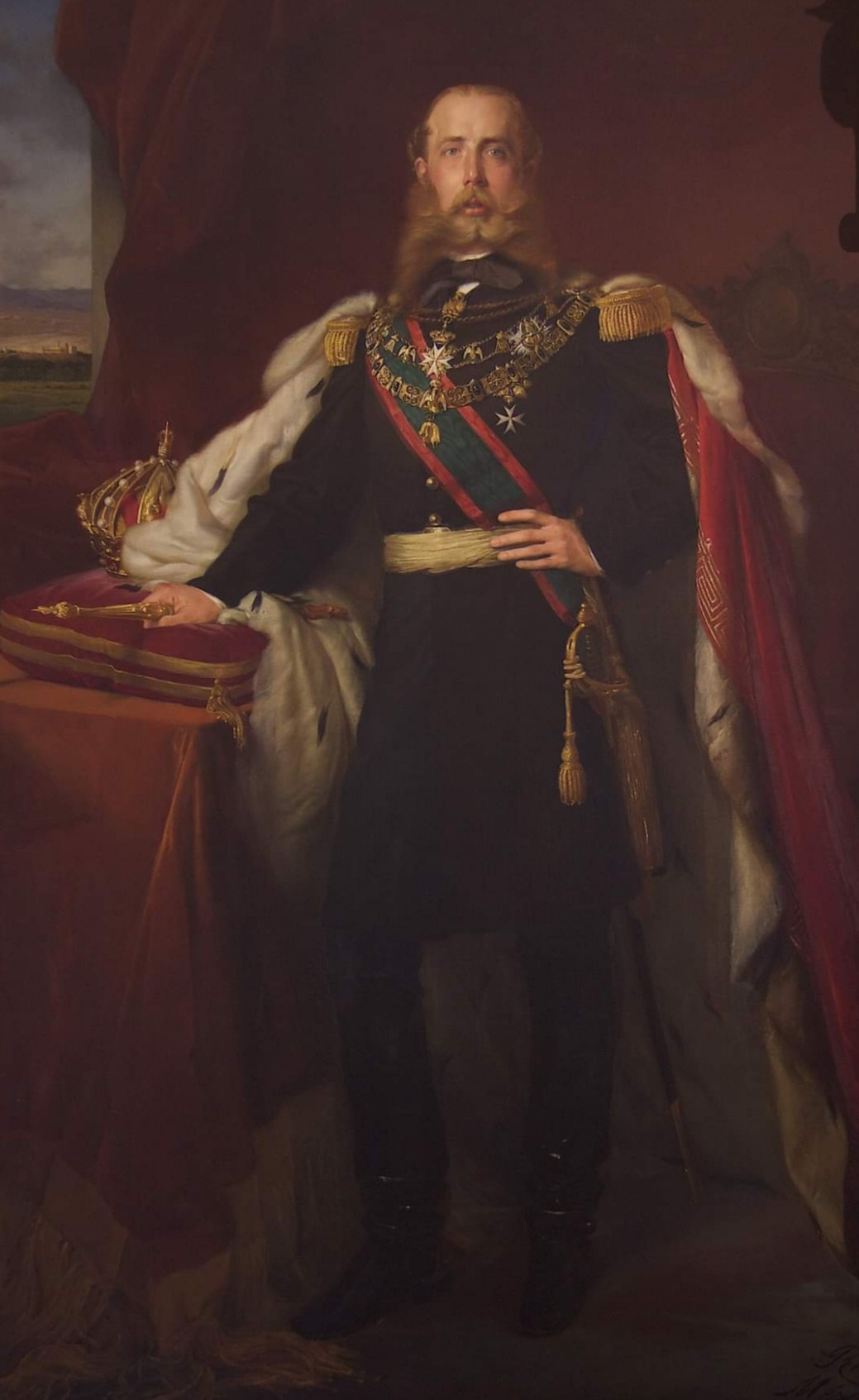
Portrait of Maximilian as Emperor of Mexico, in Chapultepec Castle

Miguel Negrete occupied Saltillo and Monterrey, which had been abandoned by the imperialists, and advanced towards Matamoros with US volunteers. Juan Cortina, who had previously defected to the Imperialists, now returned to the Republicans. They succeeded in capturing all towns along the Rio Grande from Piedras Negras downstream, but retreated from Matamoros after facing Tomás Mejía and French troops.

Colonel Pedro José Méndez captured Ciudad Victoria on 23 April 1865, and Ciudad Tula on 4 June, cutting off communications from imperialist held Tampico.

Bazaine dispatched Generals Auguste Henri Brincourt and Baron Neigre towards the Mapimí border to go after Negrete. Meanwhile, Colonel Pierre Joseph Jeanningros left San Luis Potosí to rendezvous with the imperialists at Saltillo. Negrete skirmished with Jeanningros on 31 May and retreated. His forces were disbanded after being pursued by the imperialists.

A concentration of U.S. troops and vessels in Texas was answered by a surge of imperialist forces along the border, which limited guerrillas to more southern states. Some imperial prefects resigned, unable to govern or defend their respective departments without enough troops.

In August, as French troops were concentrated in the north under Bazaine, Sinaloa was left protected only by one regiment under Colonel Cotteret in Guaymas, while the surrounding areas were entrusted to Indian allies. Antonio Rosales was killed in August attempting to retake Álamos, but Ramón Corona pressed upon the imperialists and succeeded in driving French troops from Sinaloa to Mazatlán.

After defeating Negrete, Brincourt advanced towards Chihuahua. He entered Chihuahua City, the provisional capital of the Republic, on 15 August, reorganized the administration, and provided encouragement to the indigenous allies of the empire in the region. Juárez fled to El Paso del Norte on the US-Mexican border. Fearing a skirmish with US forces, Bazaine ordered Brincourt to return to Durango within three weeks of reaching Chihuahua. Brincourt believed that leaving a garrison of a thousand men in Chihuahua was enough to pacify the region, but Bazaine repeated his orders, and he left on 29 October.

On 1 October, the Republican government arranged a loan in New York City for $30 million.

On 2 October, partly in response to the Americans on the Republican side, Maximilian issued the "Black Decree":

The troops under your orders will take no prisoners. Every individual of whatever rank, taken with arms in his hands, shall be put to death. In the future, let there be no exchange of prisoners. Let our soldiers understand that they cannot surrender to such men. This is a death-struggle. On both sides it is only a question of killing or be killed.

Less severe penalties were prescribed for aiding guerrillas and exceptions were made for those who were forced into service or were involved circumstantially.

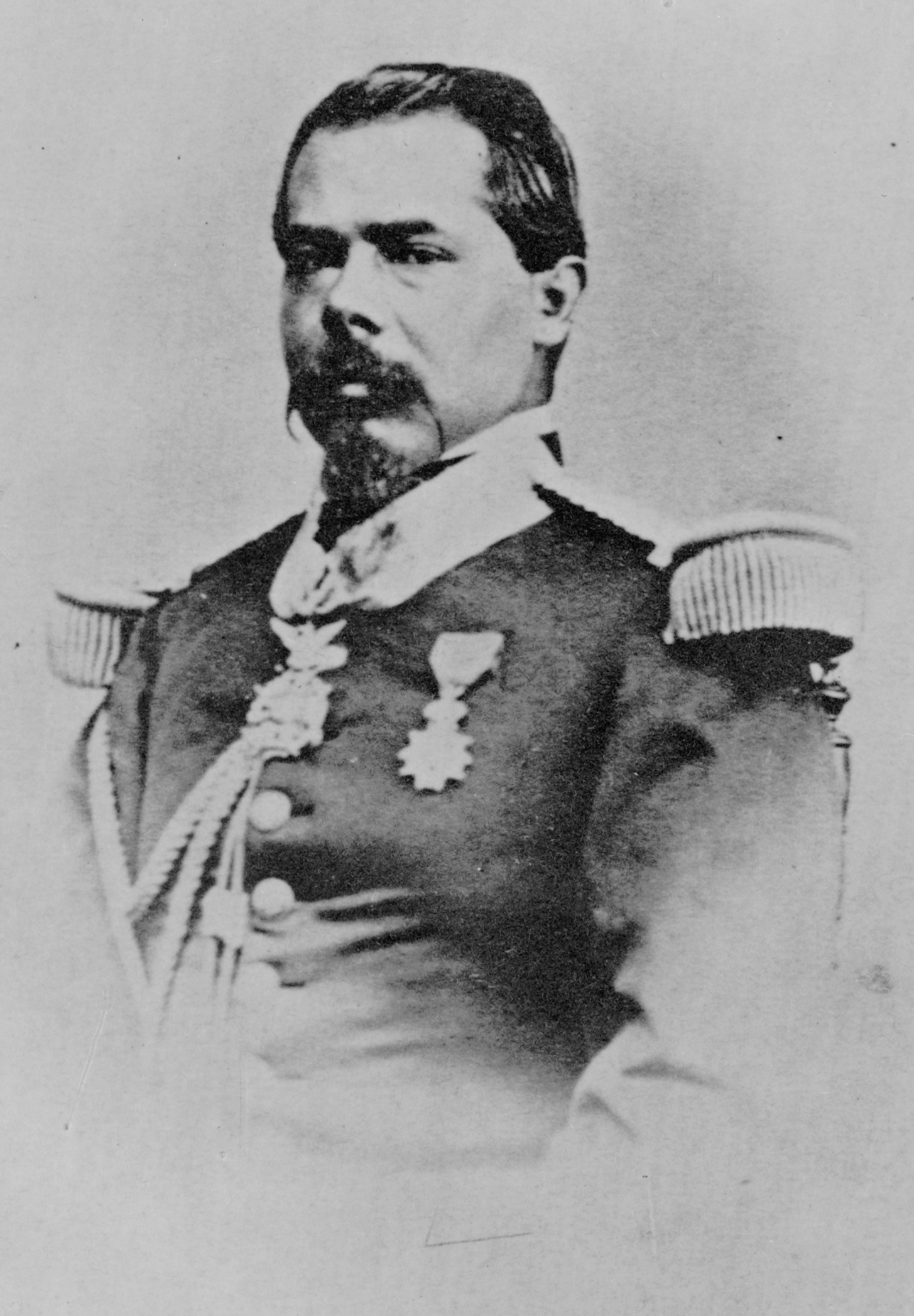
Col. Ramón Méndez, the most infamous executor of the "Black Decree"

On 13 October, Colonel Ramón Méndez defeated and captured Generals Arteaga and Salazar Ruiz at Amatlán, the latter commander in chief of the Republican army of the Center, both of whom were executed

Mariano Escobedo attempted to take Matamoros on 25 October. Mejía hesitated to take the offensive due to the presence of U.S. troops nearby, until French reinforcements arrived and scattered Escobedo's forces on 8 November.

Juárez returned to Chihuahua City on 20 November. Maximilian however had convinced Bazaine to keep Chihuahua and an expedition marched on the city under the command of Jean-Baptiste Billot. Juárez was forced to leave yet again for the border on 9 December.

Escobedo took Monterrey, but a remnant of imperial forces remained in the citadel and held out until General Pierre Joseph Jeanningros arrived on 25 November, recapturing the city.

Mejía and the French naval commander Georges Charles Cloué protested to the United States the aid in material, supplies, hospital care, and troops lent to the Republicans but Godfrey Weitzel, the commander of Clarksville (now a disappeared town at the mouth of the Rio Grande), replied that such troops did not belong to the US Army. In January 1866, African American troops from Clarksville raided Bagdad and fired on French vessels, a blatant violation of neutrality which resulted in the United States government removing Weitzel and disciplining the soldiers involved.

=== French withdrawal from the North ===
Maximilian’s “Black Decree” backfired by creating liberal martyrs and deepening opposition to the empire. Facing financial strain and U.S. pressure, Napoleon III announced that he would withdraw French troops from Mexico at the opening of the French chambers in January 1866. In reply to a French request for neutrality, the U.S. Secretary of State William H. Seward said that French withdrawal should be unconditional. Napoleon III assured the US that the withdrawal would no longer be deferred, laying out a plan to reduce the troops in phases starting in November 1866 and ending one year later in November 1867. Seward requested that French reinforcements to Mexico should cease immediately, and that Austria should stop recruiting volunteers for the Mexican expedition. The French and Austrian governments complied.

On 31 January, Billot left Chihuahua City in charge of Indian allies, but it fell to Republican troops in March. Maximilian ordered Bazaine to retake Chihuahua in May, and a new expedition was prepared, but new withdrawal instructions from France caused the expedition to be abandoned.

French troops evacuated Durango in November and Castagny withdrew to León, Guanajuato, leaving the state to the Republicans. Juárez moved the government to Durango on 26 December 1866.

In Sonora and Sinaloa the French were mostly confined to the ports of Guaymas and Mazatlán, though General Edvard Emile Langberg held positions in the interior with the aid of the Opata. Álamos was captured by the Republican Ángel Martínez with Sinaloan forces and punished the indigenous Mayo and Yaqui peoples that had allied with the empire. He entered Hermosillo on 4 May only to lose it to the Imperialists the day after. The French withdrew from Guaymas in September, and around the same time Langberg was killed in a battle for Ures.

Sonora fell to the Republicans and hundreds fled to the United States or tried to follow the French. Imperialist commanders Refugio Tánori and José Almada were captured and executed with their families.

=== Southern campaign ===
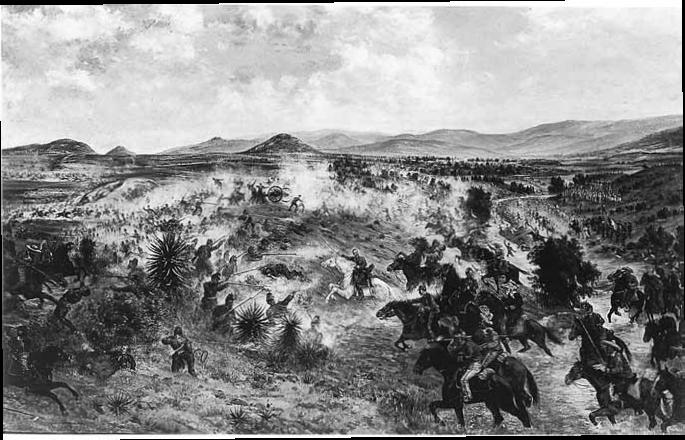
Battle of Miahuatlán (3 October 1866)

In July 1865, Arteaga advanced towards Tacámbaro where he was routed by Lieutenant Colonel Van der Smissen.

In Michoacan, Régules was repeatedly repulsed to the point that his forces dissolved in April 1866. In May however, he resumed operations and made it into the Toluca region, finding allies around Zitacuaro and Guerrero. Acapulco was held by the imperialist General Montenegro, but his troops were greatly weakened by fever and desertion.

After Porfirio Díaz escaped, he fled to Oaxaca and hoped to form a new army. The imperialist prefect Prieto had held Tehuantepec since mid-1865 and hoped to turn it into a base for operations. Díaz encroached in the Spring of 1866, attacking Jamiltepec and Putla to cut off communications between Oaxaca and Puebla. Díaz took Teotitlan in August, before he was repulsed by Austro-Mexican forces. In early October, Díaz routed the General Oronoz, who barely escaped and retreated into Oaxaca City, after which Díaz began to siege. An Austro-Mexican relief expedition was defeated by Díaz, and Oaxaca City fell on 1 November. From there he completed the capture of Oaxaca and advanced into Puebla.

=== Gulf campaign ===
In the northeast, Pedro José Méndez blocked the route to Tampico, Escobedo was based north of Linares, and Gonzáles Herrera and Jerónimo Treviño were around Parras. After a Republican assault on Parras, the imperialist Briant came from Saltillo and reinstalled the imperialist prefect Campos, on 20 February. He then attacked the Republicans at Santa Isabel, Chihuahua where due to underestimating their forces was routed and captured. The Republicans did not immediately take Parras, but the French withdrawal let them in, in June 1866.

At Charco Escondido, Mejía was joined by Jeanningros in April. Another train of reinforcements led by General Olvera left Matamoros but were surrounded and defeated by Escobedo near Camargo. Olvera retreated to Matamoros, but the Imperialist Tuce who had arrived with reinforcements from Monterey was obliged to retreat. Left with only 500 men, Mejía retreated on 23 June to Veracruz.

In November, Matamoros fell to the Republicans with the aid of U.S. troops. On 9 November, the imperialist Generals Márquez and Miramón returned from Europe to aid in the war effort. By the end of November, the French withdrawal had resulted in the Republicans taking back the North and West of the country.

On 13 November, the French completed the evacuation of Mazatlán. After aiding the evacuation the former imperialist Lozada retired from the conflict and proclaimed his neutrality.

The Republican Méndez who had raided communications between San Luis Potosí and the Gulf of Mexico was killed during an imperialist raid near Tampico. However, due to the French withdrawal, the Republican Aureliano Rivera captured Tampico in May. The French held the port but surrendered in July and in August they also surrendered Tuxpan. Veracruz was the only gulf port left under imperialist control.

Monterrey was evacuated by the Imperialists on 25 July, and Saltillo on 4 August.

Douay evacuated Matehuala on 28 October, then the northernmost imperial post. Troops were left in San Luis Potosí under Mejía, but he retreated on Christmas Eve to San Felipe, Guanajuato. Castagny reached Guanajuato around the same time, with French forces from Durango and Zacatecas, evacuated in November.

=== French withdrawal from Central Mexico ===
Veracruz and the roads leading to it were harassed by Republicans since the beginning of 1866. The imperialists won a battle at the Papaloapan River, but by August, Tlacotalpan and Alvarado, Veracruz surrendered to the Republicans. A revolt led by Ignacio Alatorre was crushed in Papantla and Misantla, but with Republican successes further north, Alatorre rose up again, capturing Jalapa in November. Pachuca was captured by Republicans in November, and Perote, Veracruz fell in January, 1867.

Mexico City became vulnerable in late 1866. Cuautitlán was raided in October, and Chalco de Díaz Covarrubias and Tlalpan were left exposed to Republican incursions in December, while raiders harassed the stream of imperial soldiers and refugees heading to Veracruz. The Imperialist commander Ortiz de la Peña retreated to Cuernavaca after a defeat at Ixtla, and Régules and Vicente Riva Palacio occupied the Lerma Valley.

Guadalajara was abandoned by the French on 12 December 1866, and imperial forces were left under General Gutiérrez. The imperialists evacuated the city on 19 December, and headed for Guanajuato. The former imperial commander Lozada declared the neutrality of Nayarit.

On 19 December 1866, Napoleon III announced that all French troops would be withdrawn, ahead of prior schedule.

In late December, the French evacuated Guanajuato, rendezvousing in Querétaro with troops from San Luis Potosí and head towards Veracruz. However, an imperialist garrison under Mejía remained at Guanajuato and was able to keep the Republicans at bay.

Bazaine evacuated Mexico City on 5 February 1867. Veracruz was left to the imperialist General Pérez Gómez. More than thirty vessels, including transports, mail steamers, and squadron ships helped the evacuation of Veracruz. Bazaine and the last French troops embarked for Toulon on 12 March.

=== Fall of the empire ===
After a council at Orizaba which decided against his abdication, Maximilian intended to return to Mexico City, first remaining at Puebla for nearly three weeks and making preparations for the campaign. The country was divided into three military districts: the western, comprising the provinces north of Colima, including Durango and Chihuahua; the eastern, stretching from Aguascalientes and Tampico northward; and the central, embracing all the vast remainder to Chiapas. Miramón took command of the western district, Mejía of the east with nearly 4,000 men; and Márquez, the center, with 4,000 under Ramón Méndez in Michoacán. 2,000 more troops were stationed in Puebla, where Maximilian assumed supreme command, issuing orders for the active formation of the new imperial army as well as a militia.

However, the Western and Eastern military districts were already largely in possession of the Republicans, as well as the region south of Puebla, while the few remaining central provinces were overrun by hostile bands and about to be invaded by Republican armies. Funds and resources were also lacking.

On 27 January 1867, Miramón took Aguascalientes and nearly succeeded in capturing President Juárez, but Governor Auza managed to save him. Miramón retired to join Castillo at San Luis Potosí. Escobedo figured Mejía's intention and intercepted him at San Jacinto on 1 February, routing him. Miramón escaped with Castillo and took refuge in Querétaro. The Republicans captured Guanajuato and Morelia. The Imperialists retreated from Michoacan to the limits of San Luis Potosí and Querétaro.

==== Siege of Querétaro ====
Maximilian joined the army at Querétaro along with Minister Aguirre, Leonardo Márquez, and Miguel López with 50,000 pesos, 1,600 men and twelve cannons. Maximilian reached Querétaro on 19 February, and was received by Miramón and other generals who held a reception for the Emperor.

A few days after, a review of the troops was held, showing 9,000 men with 39 cannons, including about 600 Frenchmen who had chosen to remain in Mexico. Miramón was placed at the head of the infantry, of which Castillo and Casanova received a division each, Méndez assumed command of the reserve brigade, in which López served as colonel, Mejía became chief of the cavalry, Reyes of engineers, and Arellano of the artillery. Márquez, chief of the general staff, was accorded the foremost place, to the affront of Miramón.

In the first council of war held on 22 February, it was agreed to fight the Republicans before their combined forces became too strong, but ultimately this strategy, which historian Hubert Howe Bancroft suggested could have achieved victory, was rejected on the advice of Márquez. As the Republicans began to surround Querétaro, Márquez suggested retreating to Mexico City to gather forces and face the Republicans in one final battle. This was dismissed as impractical.

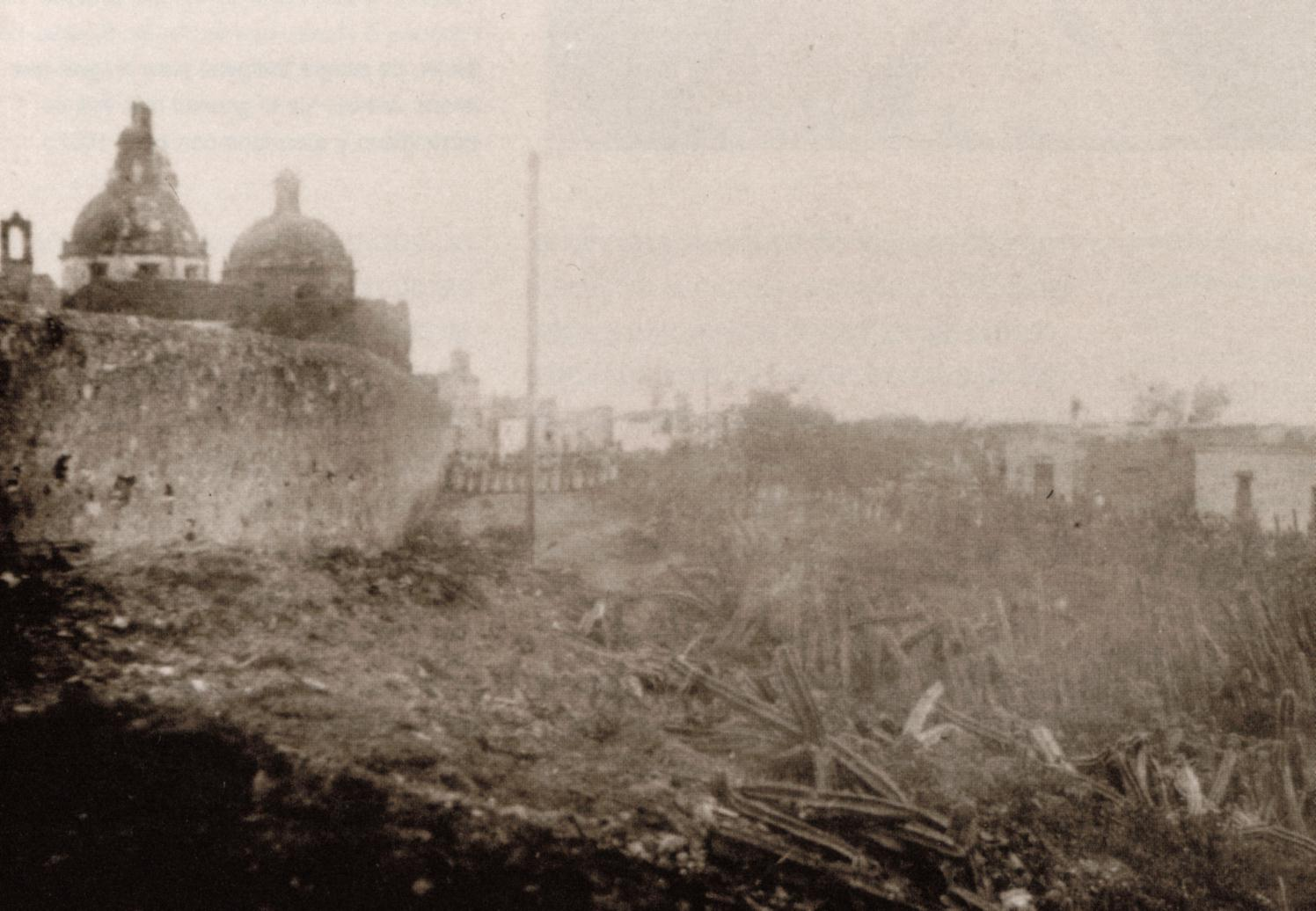
Photo of Queretaro taken during the battle

On 5 March, the Republicans prepared for the siege of Querétaro. After fighting had begun, Márquez again suggested to retreat to Mexico City, but Miramón and others opposed it. Miramón planned a counterattack to recover the hill of San Gregorio on 17 March. When the time arrived however, a false alarm arose that the Imperialist headquarters were under attack, leading to the assault being canceled.

Miramón now wanted to destroy the Western positions of the Republicans, providing a retreat if needed. Márquez was assigned to go to Mexico City for reinforcements. Miramón provided a distraction on 22 March, leading an expedition down the valley, which captured a quantity of provisions. Márquez was able to depart during the night with 1,200 horsemen and Miramón became the commander at Querétaro.

After the Imperialists repulsed another Republican assault, Miramón, during an award ceremony, took one of the medals and asked to decorate the Emperor for his conduct during the battle, which Maximilian accepted.

On 1 April Miramón led a counterattack at San Gregorio, but the result was indecisive.

As news of Márquez failed to arrive, a second mission was sent to Mexico City. Miramón urged Maximilian to leave but the emperor chose to stay. The mission failed, and the leading officers urged surrender.

The Imperialists planned to fight their way out of Querétaro, and as preparation Miramón attacked the Cimatario Hill on 27 April. The Imperialists surprised the Republicans, dispersing thousands and taking 500 prisoners, but the Imperialists squandered vital time planning their next move, and Republican reserves arrived to get final victory.

The Imperialists now sought to break through enemy lines, into the Sierra Gorda mountains and possibly the coast. The operation was scheduled for 15 May. However before this was carried out, the imperialists were betrayed by López, and on the night of 14 May, he opened the gates of Querétaro to the Republicans in exchange for gold. Republicans quickly overwhelmed the city and Miramón, Mejía, and Maximilian were taken prisoner.

==== Execution of Maximilian ====
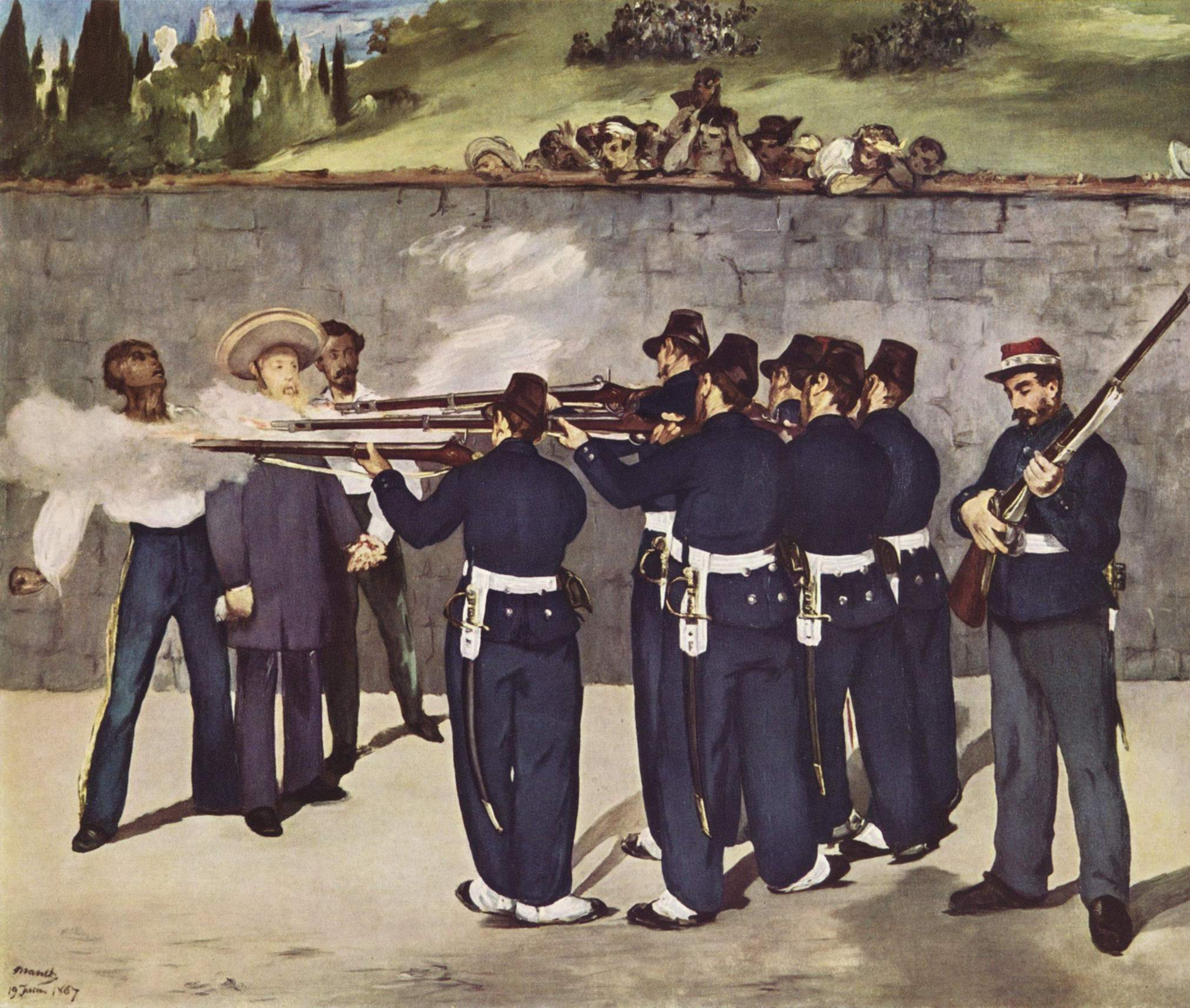
The Execution of Emperor Maximilian, Édouard Manet 1868. Gen. Tomás Mejía, left; Maximilian, center; Gen. Miguel Miramón, right. It is one of five versions of his renderings of the event.

Following a court-martial, Maximilian was sentenced to death. Many European monarchs and other prominent figures (including Victor Hugo and Giuseppe Garibaldi) pleaded Juárez for Maximilian's life to be spared, but he refused to commute the sentence. He believed he had to send a strong message that Mexico would not tolerate any government imposed by foreign powers.

Maximilian was executed on 19 June along with Generals Miguel Miramón and Tomás Mejía on the Cerro de las Campanas, outside Querétaro. Mexico City surrendered the day after Maximilian's execution.

Juárez returned to the national capital. He actually made few changes in policy because the progressive Maximilian had kept most of Juárez's liberal reforms but they were falsely signed only to be spared with the Mexican conservatives (who brought him to Mexico to over throw Juárez and the liberal party) after all the territory stolen from the Mexican indigenous and those who supported the reform of political power. Juárez returned the land stolen from Maximilian and all the foreign armies that came to support the French and the Mexican conservatives to the tribes and land stolen for the European powers that the tribes used for the purpose of farming, hunting, and raising animals. As well Juárez and the party signed a reform only for it be later annexed by Porfirio Diaz so that no one in congress, senate, and representative can have more than one term of 4 years and president for 10 years, because Maximilian and the conservative party had made so they can choose who can govern without the right of the people to vote.

== Aftermath ==
The republican victory transformed Mexico’s political landscape. The defeat of the French consolidated liberal hegemony and allowed central elites, now organized within the Liberal Party, to impose a state-building project over regional and peripheral powers. The Mexican Conservative Party was so thoroughly discredited by its alliance with the French that it became effectively defunct. The Liberal Party was almost unchallenged during the first years of the restored republic. In 1871, Juárez was elected for another term in spite of a constitutional prohibition of re-elections.

Porfirio Díaz, one of the losing candidates, launched a rebellion against Juárez. Supported by more conservative factions within the Liberal Party, the attempted revolt (Plan de la Noria) was nearly defeated when Juárez died on 19 July 1872. Díaz ran against interim president Sebastián Lerdo de Tejada, lost, and retired to his hacienda in Oaxaca. Four years later, in 1876, when Lerdo ran for re-election, Díaz launched a second, successful revolt (the Plan de Tuxtepec) and captured the presidency. He held it through eight terms until 1911, a period known as the Porfiriato.

France's adventure in Mexico improved relations with Austria through Maximilian but produced no lasting results. In 1866, Prussia defeated Austria in the Austro-Prussian War while French troops were still in Mexico. The Second French Empire would itself collapse in 1870 during the Franco-Prussian War.

== U.S. diplomacy and involvement ==
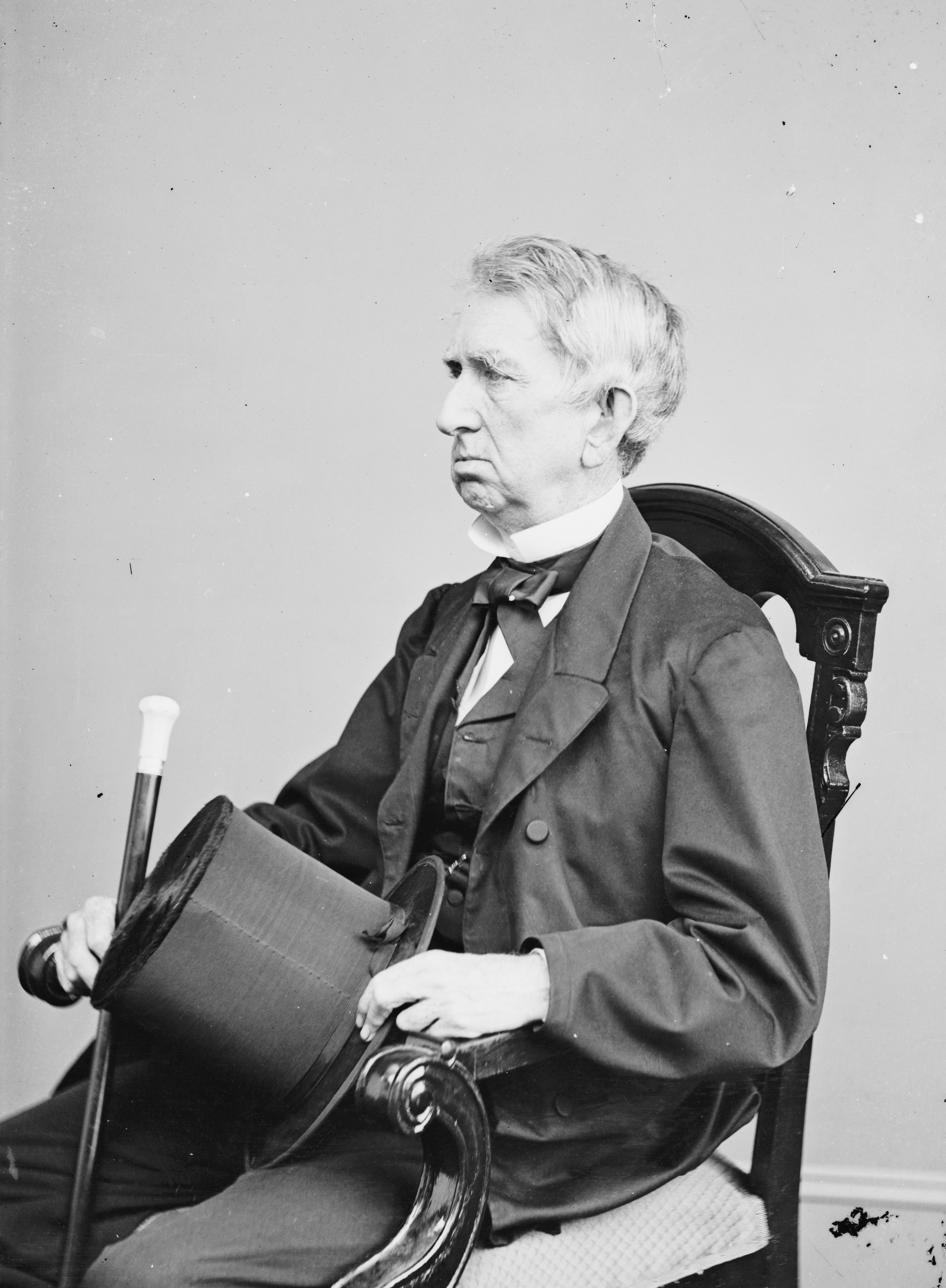
William H. Seward by Matthew Brady

As early as 1859, U.S. and Mexican efforts to ratify the McLane–Ocampo Treaty had failed in the divided United States Senate, where tensions were high between the North and the South over slavery. Such a treaty would have allowed U.S. construction in Mexico and protection from European forces in exchange for a payment of $4 million to the heavily indebted government of Benito Juárez. On 3 December 1860, President James Buchanan delivered a speech stating his displeasure at being unable to secure Mexico from European interference:

European governments would have been deprived of all pretext to interfere in the territorial and domestic concerns of Mexico. We should have thus been relieved from the obligation of resisting, even by force, should this become necessary, any attempt of these governments to deprive our neighboring Republic of portions of her territory, a duty from which we could not shrink without abandoning the traditional and established policy of the American people.

United States policy did not change during the French occupation. Abraham Lincoln expressed his sympathy to Latin American republics against any European attempt to establish a monarchy. Shortly after the establishment of the imperial government in April 1864, United States Secretary of State William H. Seward, while maintaining U.S. neutrality, expressed discomfort at the imposition of a monarchy in Mexico: "Nor can the United States deny that their own safety and destiny to which they aspire are intimately dependent on the continuance of free republican institutions throughout America."

On 4 April 1864, Congress passed a joint resolution:

Resolved, &c., That the Congress of the United States are unwilling, by silence, to leave the nations of the world under the impression that they are indifferent spectators of the deplorable events now transpiring in the Republic of Mexico; and they therefore think fit to declare that it does not accord with the policy of the United States to acknowledge a monarchical government, erected on the ruins of any republican government in America, under the auspices of any European power.

Near the end of the American Civil War, representatives at the 1865 Hampton Roads Conference briefly discussed a proposal for a north–south reconciliation by a joint action against the French in Mexico. In 1865, through the selling of Mexican bonds by Mexican agents in the United States, the Juárez administration raised between $16 million and $18 million for the purchase of American war material. Between 1865 and 1868, General Herman Sturm acted as an agent to deliver guns and ammunition to the Mexican Republic. In 1866 General Philip Sheridan was in charge of transferring additional supplies and weapons to the Liberal army, including some 30,000 rifles directly from the Baton Rouge Arsenal in Louisiana.

By 1867, Seward shifted American policy from thinly veiled sympathy for the republican government of Juárez to open threat of war to induce a French withdrawal. Seward stated in 1868, "The Monroe Doctrine, which eight years ago was merely a theory, is now an irreversible fact."

== Divisions and disembarkation of allied troops ==
=== French expeditionary force, 31 December 1862 ===
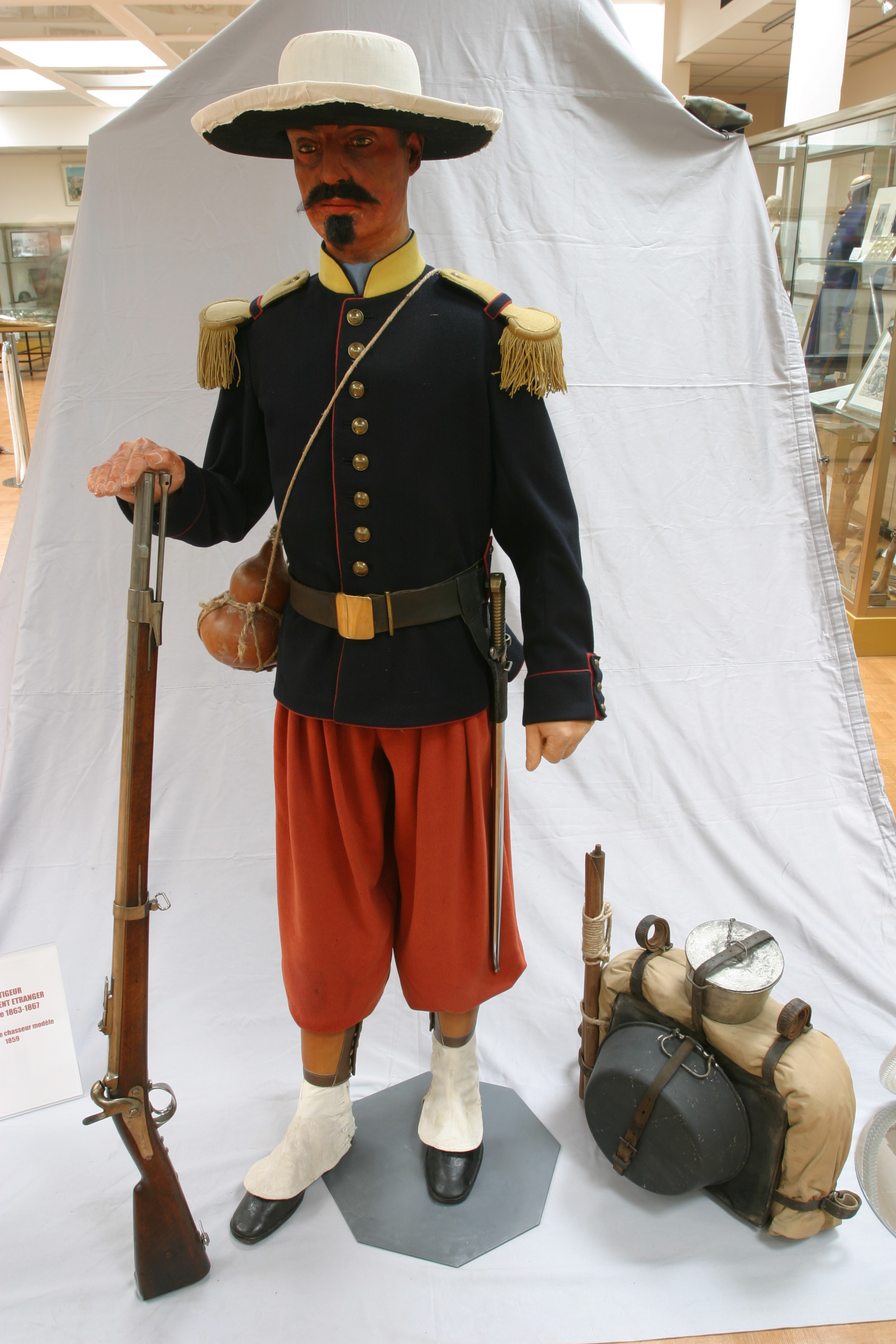
Campaign uniform of a French Foreign legionary during the Mexican campaign

At its peak in 1863, the French expeditionary force counted 38,493 men (which represented 16.25% of the French army). 6,654 French died, including 4,830 from disease. Among these losses, 1,918 of the deaths were from the regiment of the French Foreign Legion.

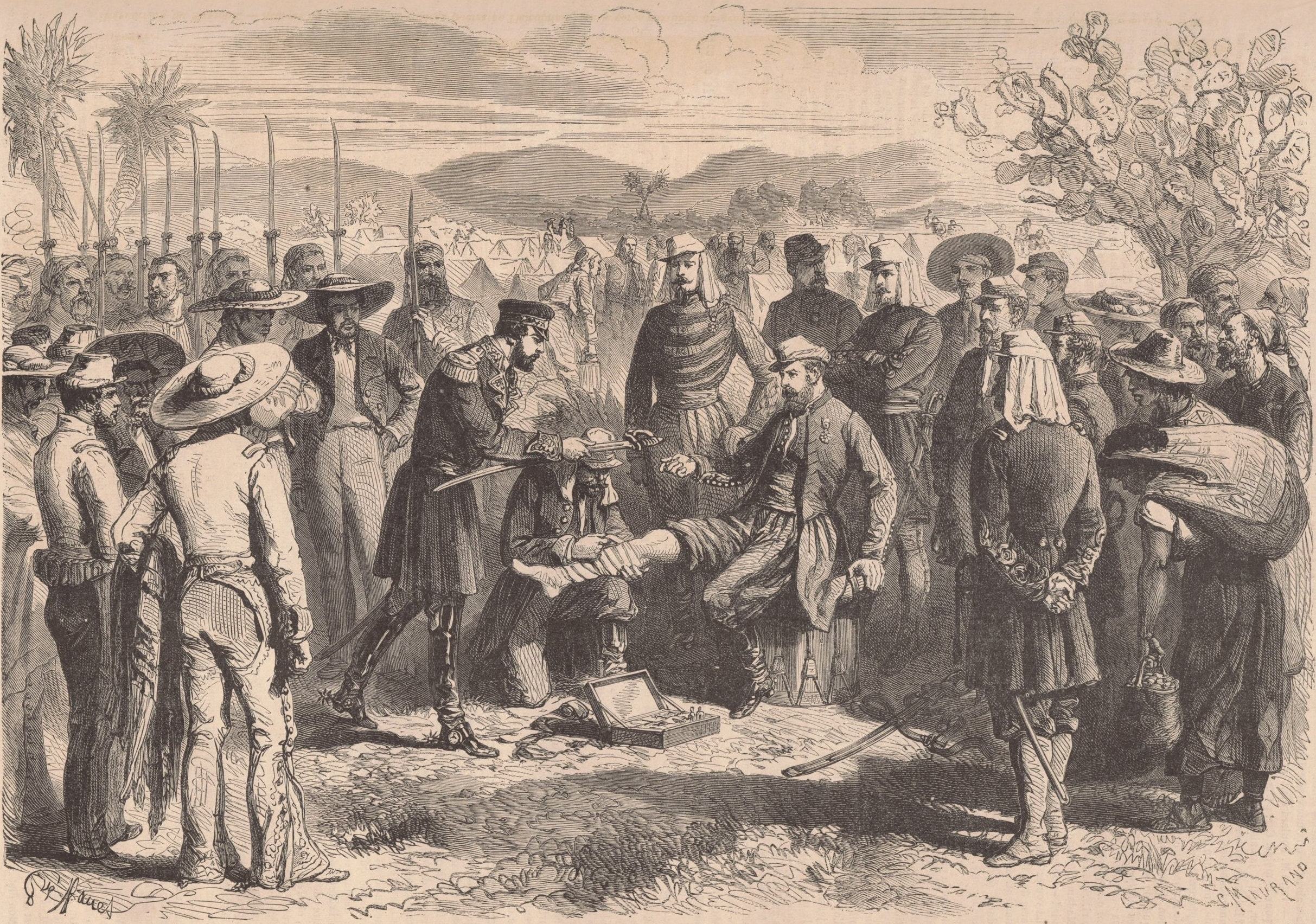
Victory of Jiquilpan, won by Colonel Clinchant, 2nd Zouaves

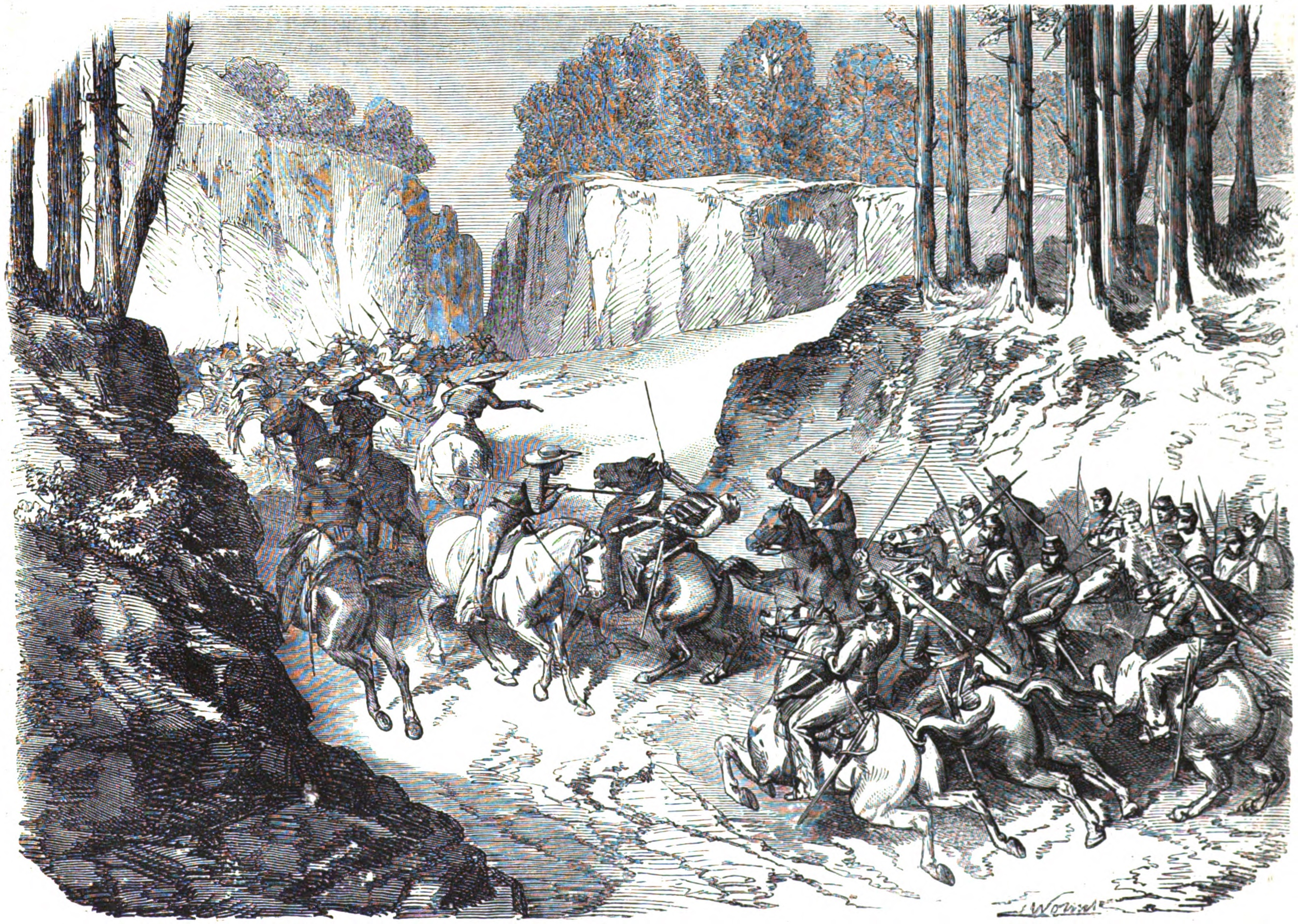
French Chasseurs d'Afrique at the Battle of San Pablo del Monte

Général de Division Forey

==== 1^{ère} Division d'Infanterie (GdD Bazaine) ====
- 1^{ère} Brigade (GdB de Castagny)
  - 18^{e} Bataillon de Chasseurs
  - 1^{er} Régiment de Zouaves
  - 81^{e} Régiment de Ligne
- 2^{e} Brigade (GdB ?)
  - 20^{e} Bataillon de Chasseurs
  - 3^{ème} Régiment de Zouaves
  - 95^{e} Régiment d'Infanterie légère
  - Bataillon de Tirailleurs algériens
- 2x Marine artillery batteries

==== 2^{e} Division d'Infanterie (GdB Douay – acting) ====
- 1^{ère} Brigade (Col Hellier – acting)
  - 1^{er} Bataillon de Chasseurs
  - 2^{e} Régiment de Zouaves
  - 99^{e} Régiment d'Infanterie légère
- 2^{e} Brigade (GdB Berthier)
  - 7^{e} Bataillon de Chasseurs
  - 51^{e} Régiment de Ligne
  - 62^{e} Régiment de Ligne
- 2x Army artillery batteries

==== Brigade de Cavallerie (GdB de Mirandol) ====
- 1^{er} Régiment de Marche (2 squadrons each of 1^{er} and 2^{e} Chasseurs d'Afrique)
- 2^{e} Régiment de Marche (2 squadrons each of 3^{e} Chasseurs d'Afrique and 12^{e} Chasseurs à cheval)

==== Naval Brigade ====
- Bataillon de Fusiliers-Marins
- 2^{e} Régiment d'Infanterie de Marine

Units not yet arrived:

- 7^{e} Régiment de Ligne (2000 men)
- 1^{e} Régiment Étranger (4000 men)
- 2^{e} Bataillon d'Infanterie legère d'Afrique (900 men)
- Bataillon Egyptien
- detachment/ 5^{e} Régiment de Hussards

=== Belgian Voluntary Troops, 1864–65 ===
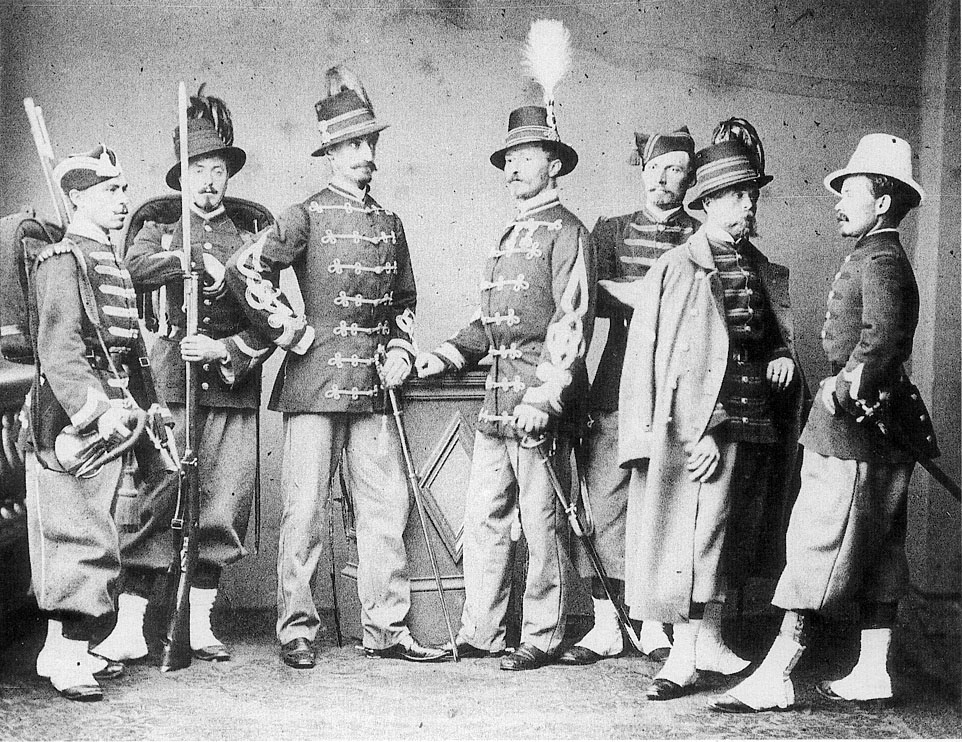
Belgian Legion in Mexico

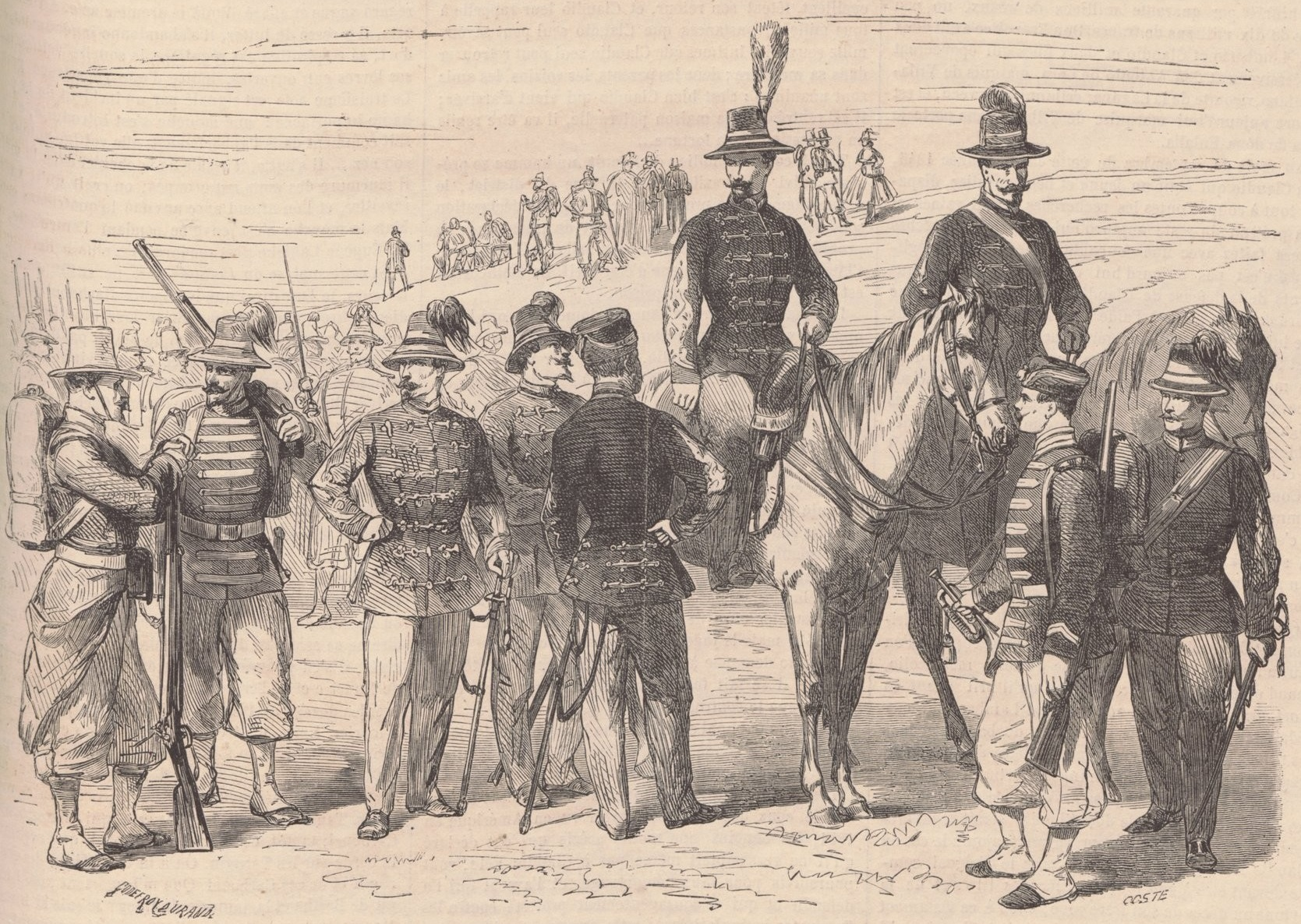
Uniforms of officers and soldiers of the Belgian regiment: bodyguards of the Empress Charlotte.

This corps was officially designated as the "Belgian Volunteers", but generally known as the "Belgian Legion".

- Bataillon de l'Impératrice Charlotte (grenadiers)
- Bataillon Roi des Belges (voltigeurs)

==== 16 October 1864 ====
- 1st Grenadier Company
  - 4 Officers, 16 Non-commissioned officers, 125 grenadiers, 6 musicians, 1 canteener
- 2nd Grenadier Company "Bataillon de l'Impératrice"
  - 4 Officers, 16 Non-commissioned officers, 122 grenadiers, 4 musicians, 1 canteener
- 1st voltigeur Company
  - 4 Officers, 16 Non-commissioned officers, 122 voltigeurs, 4 musicians, 1 canteener
- 2nd voltigeur Company
  - 4 Officers, 16 Non-commissioned officers, 121 voltigeurs, 4 musicians, 1 canteener

==== 14 November 1864 ====
- 3rd Grenadier Company
  - 4 Officers, 16 Non-commissioned officers, 68 grenadiers, 6 musicians, 1 canteener
- 4th Grenadier Company
  - 4 Officers, 15 Non-commissioned officers, 67 grenadiers, 6 musicians, 1 canteener
- 3rd voltigeur Company
  - 3 Officers, 16 Non-commissioned officers, 61 voltigeurs, 3 musicians, 1 canteener
- 4th voltigeur Company
  - 3 Officers, 15 Non-commissioned officers, 69 voltigeurs, 4 musicians, 1 canteener

==== 16 December 1864 ====
- 5th Grenadier Company
- 6th Grenadier Company
- 5th voltigeur Company
- 6th voltigeur Company
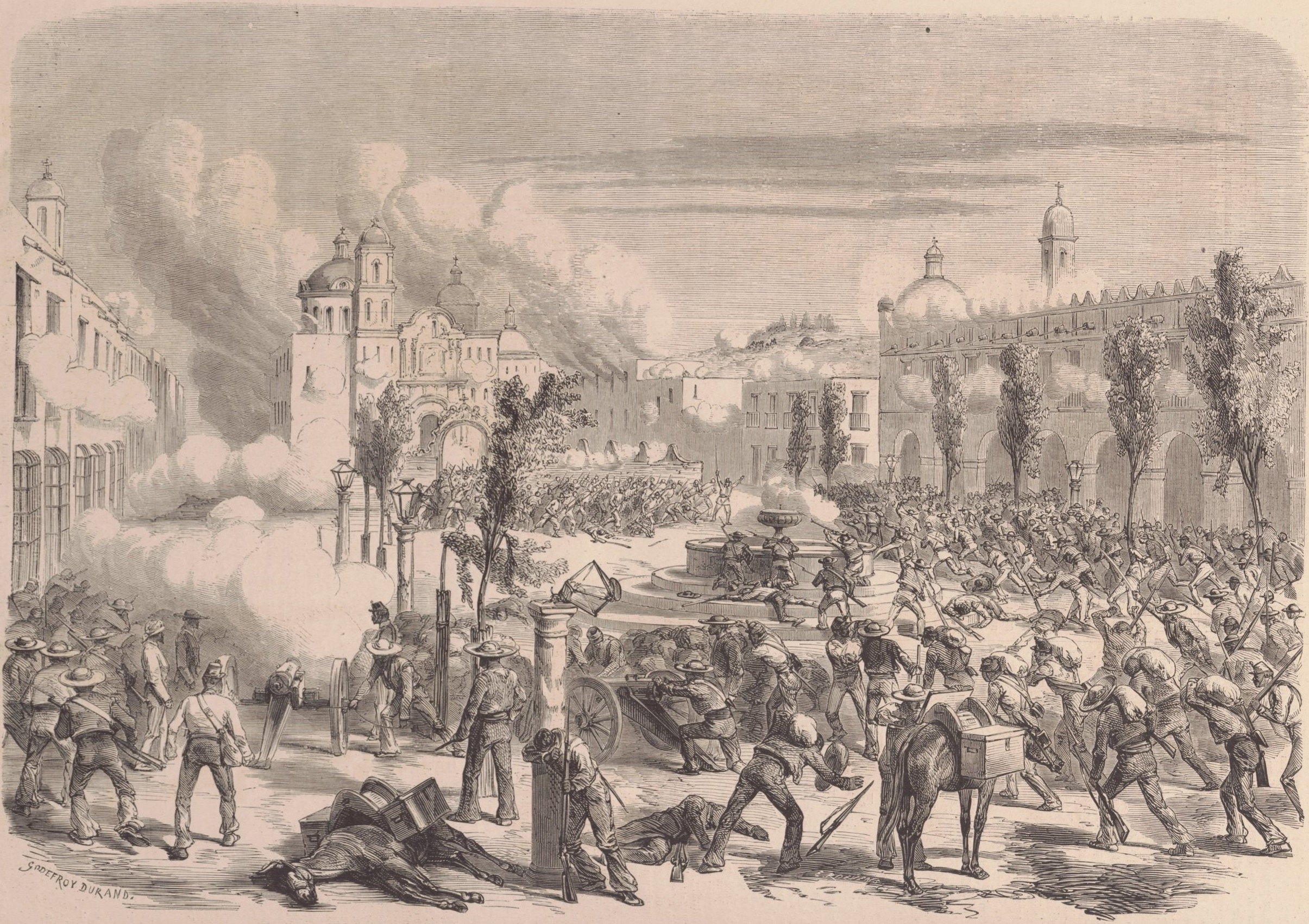
  Defense of the Belgian battalion in the Battle of Tacámbaro.
  - 362 volunteers

==== 27 January 1865 ====
  - 189 volunteers

==== 15 April 1866 ====
- 1st Mounted Company
  - 70–80 horsemen (formed from Regiment "Impératrice Charlotte")

==== 16 July 1866 ====
- 2nd Mounted Company
  - 70–80 horsemen (formed from Regiment "Roi des Belges")

=== Austrian Voluntary Corps, December 1864 ===
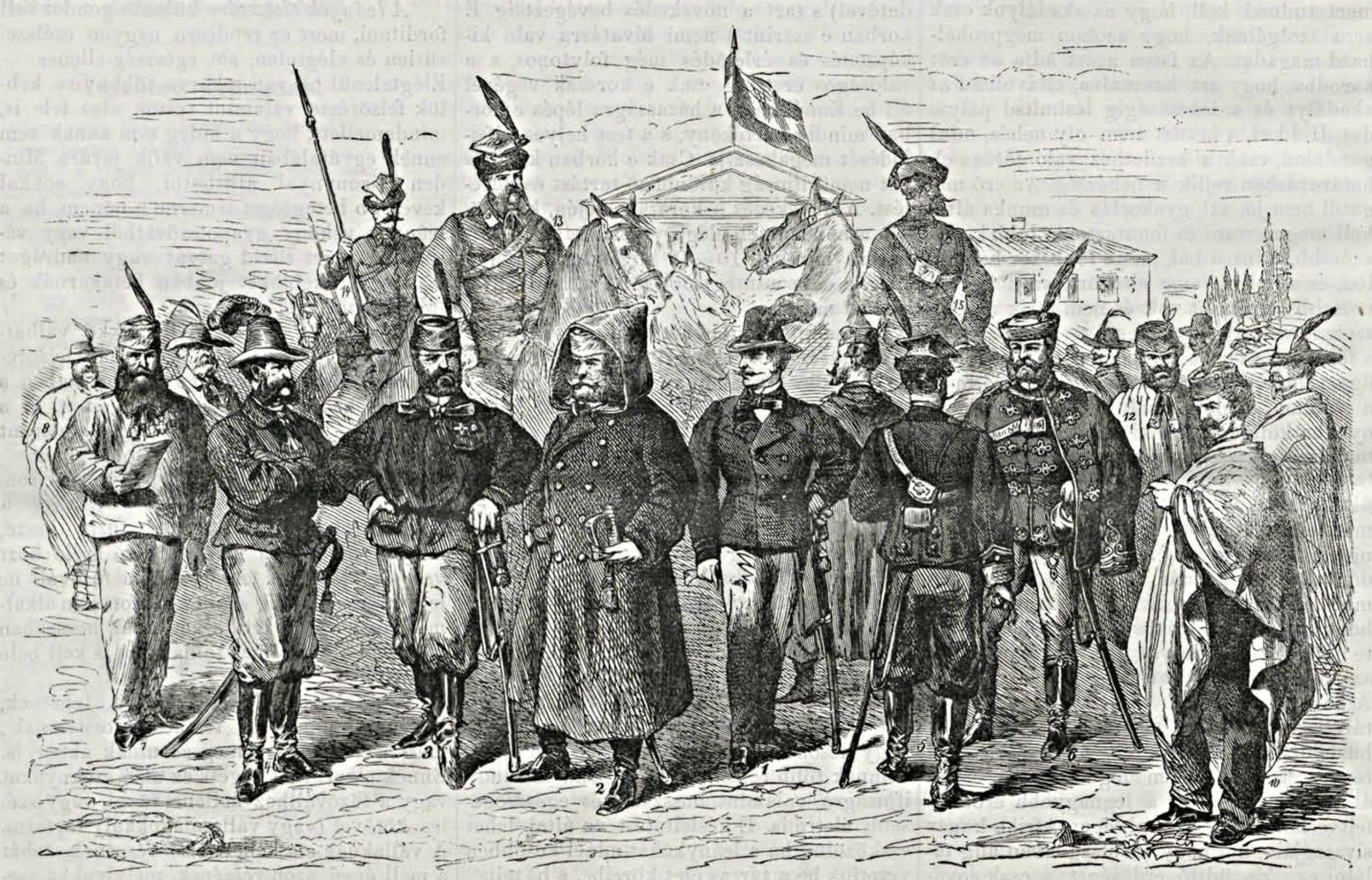
Austrian Voluntary Corps

While officially designated as the Austrian Voluntary Corps, this foreign contingent included Hungarian, Polish and other volunteers from the Danube Monarchy. It consisted of:

- 159 officers
- 403 infantry and jägers (Austrian)
- 366 hussars (Hungarian)
- 16 uhlans (Polish)
- 67 bombardiers (mixed)
- 30 pioneers (mixed)
- several doctors

=== Egyptian Auxiliary Corps, January 1863 ===
This unit was commonly designated as the "Egyptian Battalion". It consisted of 453 men (including troops recruited from the Sudan), who were placed under the command of French commandant Mangin of the 3rd Zouave Regiment. Operating effectively in the Veracruz region, the Corps suffered 126 casualties until being withdrawn to Egypt in May 1867.

Maximilian protested the loss of the Egyptian Corps, ostensibly to suppress a rebellion in the Sudan, because they were "extremely helpful in the hot lands".

- A battalion commander
- A captain
- A lieutenant
- 8 sergeants
- 15 corporals
- 359 soldiers
- 39 recruits

=== Spanish Expeditionary Force, January 1862 ===
Making up this contingent were:

- 5373 infantry (two brigades)
- 26 pieces of artillery,
- 490 bombardiers
- 208 engineers
- 100 administrators
- 173 cavalry

This force from the regular Spanish army was withdrawn from Mexico for political reasons in early 1862.

=== Counter-Guerrillas ===
A corps of about 850 anti-guerrillas, created in October 1862 and consisting of two cavalry squadrons plus four companies of infantry and a small mountain artillery battery. This force was recruited from diverse volunteers of all available national origins under French officers. It was noted for a series of atrocities.

=== Captain Yarka, Romanian volunteer, 1863 ===
At least one Romanian, an officer, served with the French forces. Captain Yarka of the Romanian Army served with the 3rd Regiment of Chasseurs d'Afrique as a volunteer, keeping the same rank. In April 1863, Yarka engaged a Republican ("Juariste") Colonel in one-on-one combat, killing him. Yarka himself was wounded. In contemporary French sources, he is referred to as Wallachian ("Valaque").

== See also ==
- Pastry War, also known as the First French Intervention in Mexico
- History of democracy in Mexico
- List of battles of the French intervention in Mexico
- List of Second French intervention in Mexico films

== Sources ==
- Bancroft, Hubert Howe (1888). History of Mexico VI: 1861–1887. New York: The Bancroft Company.
- Clodfelter, Micheal (2017). Warfare and Armed Conflicts: A Statistical Encyclopedia of Casualty and Other Figures, 1492–2015 (4th ed.). McFarland.
- Sanders, James E. (2011). "The Vanguard of the Atlantic World: Contesting Modernity in Nineteenth-Century Latin America". Latin American Research Review. 46 (2). doi:10.1353/lar.2011.0030. JSTOR 41261459.
- Schenoni, Luis L. (2024). Bringing War Back In: Victory, Defeat, and the State in Nineteenth-Century Latin America. Cambridge: Cambridge University Press. doi:10.1017/9781009442145. ISBN 9781009442145.
