= Luigi Ghilardi =

19th-century Italian general

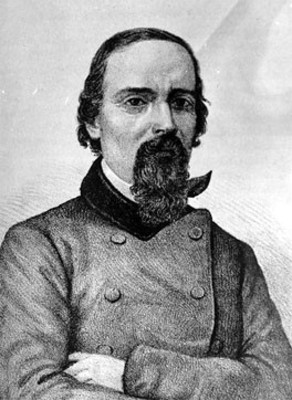
- Born: August 25, 1805; Lucca, Republic of Lucca
- Died: March 16, 1864 (aged 58); Aguascalientes City, Aguascalientes, Mexico
- Spouse: Francisca Anguera (m. 1840–1864)
- Military career
- Allegiance: July Monarchy; Portugal; Belgium; Spain; Roman Republic; Kingdom of Sicily; Peru; Mexico
- Branch: French Army; Portuguese Army; Belgian Land Component; Spanish Army; Italian Volunteer Army; Peruvian Army; Mexican Army
- Service years: 1820s–1864
- Rank: General
- Conflicts: July Revolution; Liberal Wars; Belgian Revolution; First Carlist War; First Italian War of Independence: Five Days of Milan; Sicilian revolution of 1848; Ayutla Revolution: Battle of Tizayuca (1855); Battle of Puebla (1856); Peruvian Civil War of 1856–1858; Second French intervention in Mexico: Siege of Puebla; Battle of Acapulco

Luigi Ghilardi, also known as Luis Ghilardi, was an Italian general who fought in many different conflicts during the 19th century, and who advocated for republican ideals. His parents were Nicola Ghilardi and Isabella Lucchesi. As a young man he enlisted to fight in liberal movements in Europe. In 1840 he married Francisca Anguera with whom he had a daughter named Ana. He participated in the First Italian War of Independence. Later he visited Mexico where he fought alongside the liberals in the Ayutla Revolution. He returned to Italy and tried to join the army, failing to do so he returned to Mexico where he fought against the French Intervention. He was later captured by the French and executed.

== Military Actions in Europe ==
Possibly influenced by the ideas of Giuseppe Mazzini, he was attracted to liberal and republican ideals. As a result of the repression following the 1820 revolution in Italy, several republicans fled the peninsula. Ghilardi fought in various liberal movements during the revolutions of 1830, in France, Portugal and Belgium. He traveled to Spain where he enlisted in the Spanish Army to fight against the Carlists under the command of General Santiago Durando. In 1848 he had request to leave service in Spain to fight in the First Italian War of Independence. During the 1848 armistice with the Austrians, he traveled to Sicily where he participated in the Sicilian revolution of 1848 against the Bourbon dynasty, reaching the rank of colonel. He was given a commission to travel to Switzerland to recruit troops for the Sicilian cause. In 1849 he fought to maintain the short-lived Roman Republic, where he fought alongside Giuseppe Garibaldi.

== Military Actions in the Americas ==
=== First visit to Mexico: The Ayutla Revolution ===
He could not rejoin the Spanish army because the term of his license had expired, so he decided to travel to Mexico in 1853, although there is no record of a given reason. He met with President Antonio López de Santa Anna. However, he soon participated in the Plan of Ayutla, precisely against Santa Anna. He initially fought under Santos Degollado. Around the end, Juan Álvarez, leader of the revolution, gave him the rank of brigadier general. On March 11, 1856, he participated in the assault on the city of Puebla where he was seriously wounded, so he preferred to return to Europe. 3

=== Life in Peru ===
In 1858 Ghilardi moved with his family to Peru. During the Peruvian Civil War of 1856–1858, he became involved in a conspiracy that ended with the death of General Carlos Varea, prefect of Cajamarca, which earned him a sentence of two years in prison.

In 1861 he moved to Italy to fight for unification, however because his attempt to enlist had been extemporaneous, in accordance with the laws decreed for that purpose, he was not admitted to the Royal Italian Army. For this reason, he decided to return to Mexico to combat the Second French intervention in Mexico, which had been brewing for months.

=== Second French intervention in Mexico ===
Luigi Ghilardi was commissioned to deliver correspondence from Giuseppe Garibaldi to U.S. authorities in Washington D.C., as well as to President Benito Juárez in Mexico. He arrived in New York City in May 1862 and managed to meet with the chargé d'affaires of the Mexican government in Washington, Matías Romero. He corresponded with General McClellan and was received by President Abraham Lincoln. Ghilardi asked both of them to support the Mexican cause against the intervention due to the Monroe Doctrine however, because they were facing the American Civil War, they couldn't offer help.

He landed in Acapulco and visited President Juárez in Mexico City. In 1863 he joined the Army of the East and participated in the Siege of Puebla. In July 1863, he was appointed second chief of the command in Jalisco, at a time when the Mexican troops were trying to reorganize after the defeat suffered in Puebla. After the death of Ignacio Comonfort and because the resistance had turned into guerrilla warfare, Ghilardi had decided to abandon his command and return to Europe, however, on January 17, 1864, a French commander captured him, along with other Republican officers, in Colotlan, Jalisco.

He was transferred to the city of Aguascalientes where he was court-martialed by General E. L'Heriller, and sentenced to death. The sentence was ratified by Marshal François Achille Bazaine, commander of the French troops in Mexico. His wife and daughter, who were still in Peru, were sent a letter and Ghilardi's belongings through the French consulate.

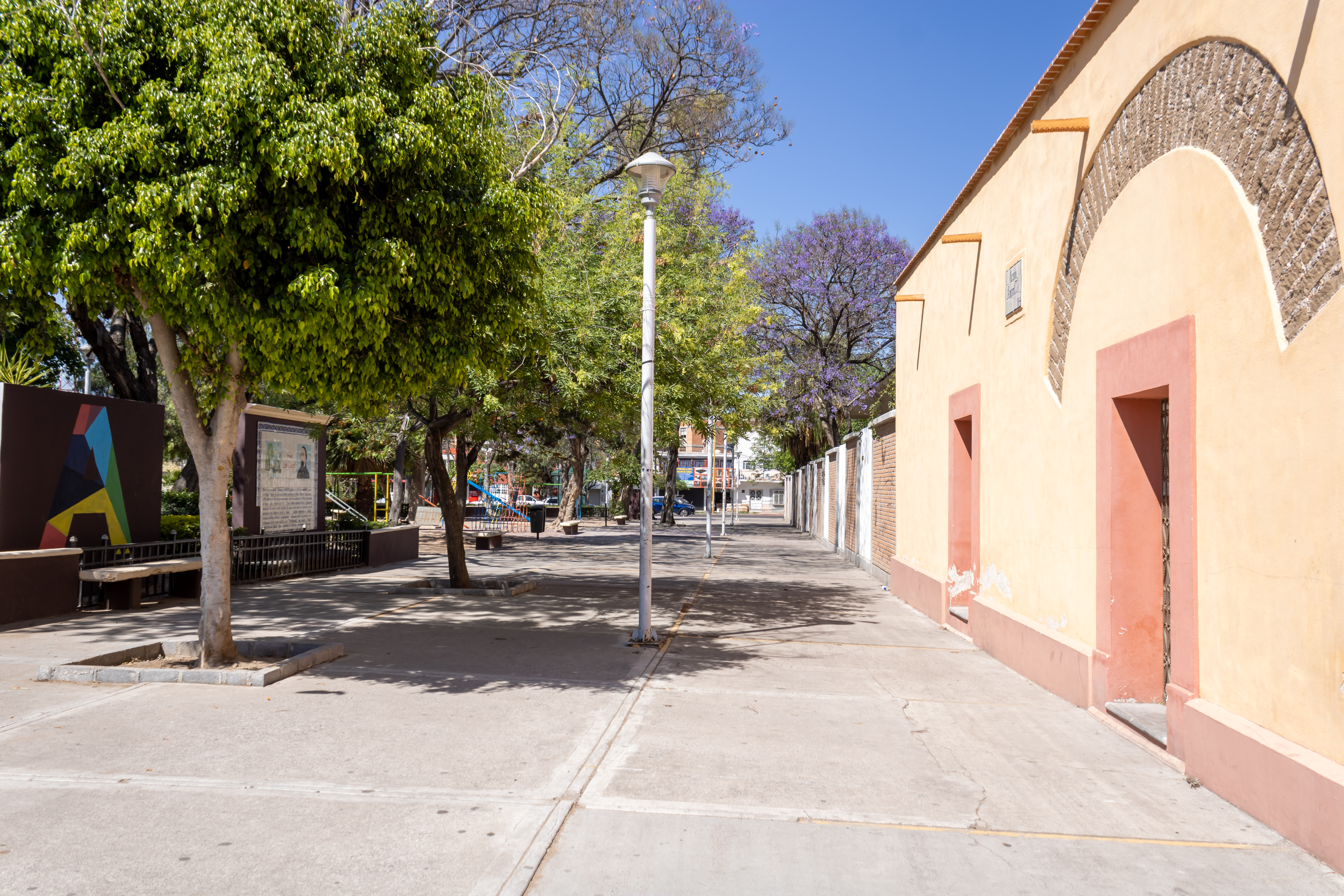
Site of the execution of General Luigi Guilardi at the Carpio garden in Aguascalientes, Mexico.

== Legacy ==
In 1925 the historian Alejandro Topete del Valle located his tomb in a pantheon in Aguascalientes City. In the 1990s, Antonio Peconi, Italian historian, researcher of Italian migration in Mexico, managed to recover a large number of documents, including correspondence, referring to Ghilardi, which he donated to the historical archive of the state of Aguascalientes. In 1994 Ghilardi's tomb was rebuilt and a tribute was paid to him, which was attended by the Italian ambassador to Mexico.

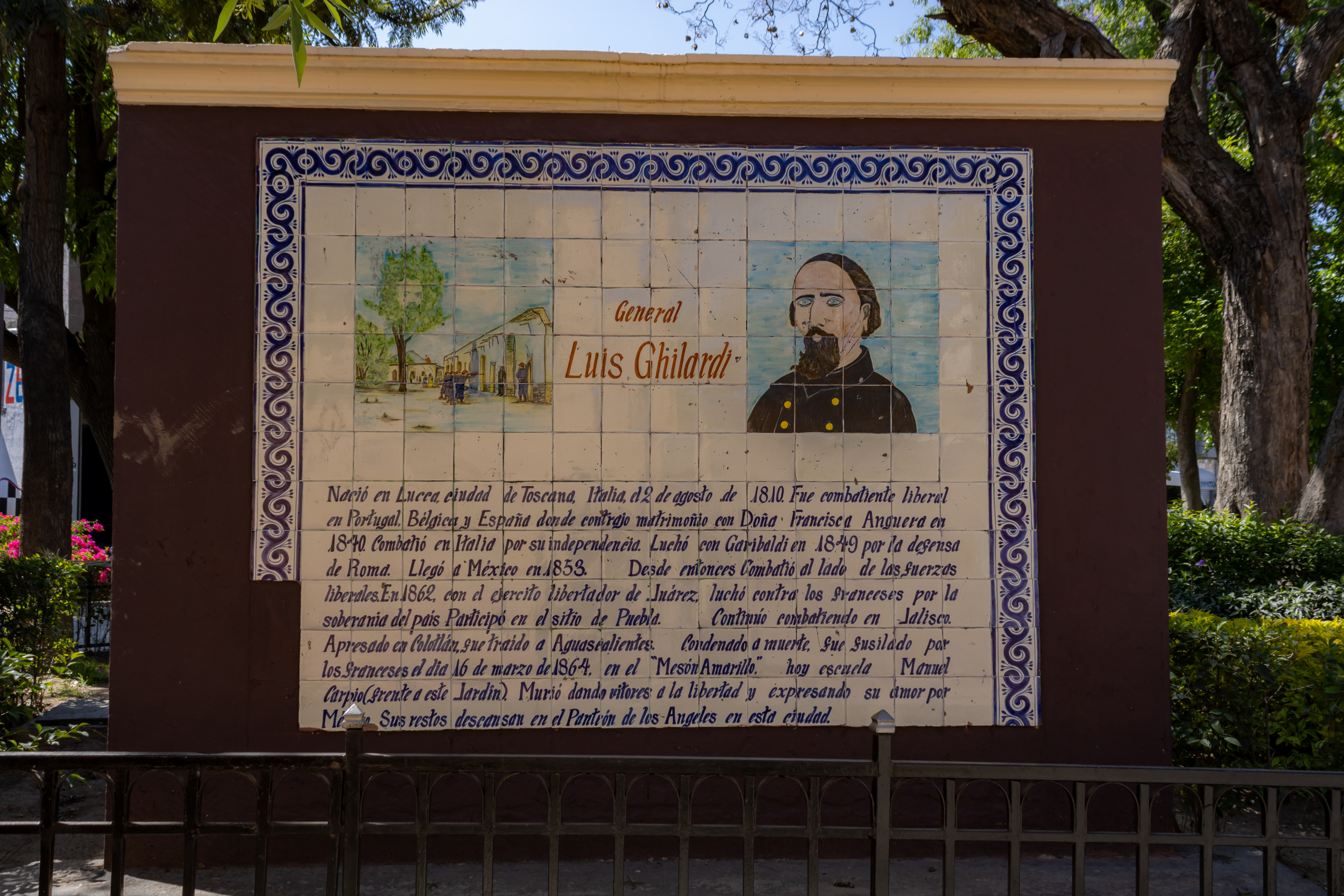
A plaque describing the actions of General Luigi Ghilardi in front of the wall of his execution.

There is a plaque in the Jardín Carpio (in the city of Aguascalientes) that indicates the place where General Ghiraldi was executed, with the following mention: "In this place General Luis Ghilardi was executed on March 16, 1864, he died for defending the freedom of Mexico".

Final resting place of General Luigi Ghilardi at the Panteon de La Cruz in Aguascalientes, Mexico.

== Works ==
- Curso de Arte y Ciencia Militar; edited by the Mexican government in 1854.
