= Colonial war =

Blanket term relating to various conflicts

Colonial war (in some contexts referred to as small war) is a blanket term relating to the various conflicts that arose as the result of overseas territories being settled by foreign powers creating a colony. The term especially refers to wars fought during the nineteenth century between European colonial armies in Africa, Americas, and Asia.

== Description ==
=== Classification ===
Traditionally, wars could be divided into three categories: wars of conquest, wars of liberation, and wars between states. These classifications can likewise be distinguished among colonial wars. Still, the term "colonial war" typically refers to a war of conquest. Wars of conquest, in a colonial context, can be further broken down into two stages: a period of typically brief, regular warfare between an invading power and an indigenous force (which may be, in comparison to the invader, irregular in composition or organization) followed by a period of irregular warfare. Counter-insurgency operations may be undertaken in order to prepare territory for settlement. Once a foothold has been established by an incoming power, it may launch expeditions into neighboring territory in retaliation against hostility or to neutralize a potential enemy.

=== Common characteristics ===
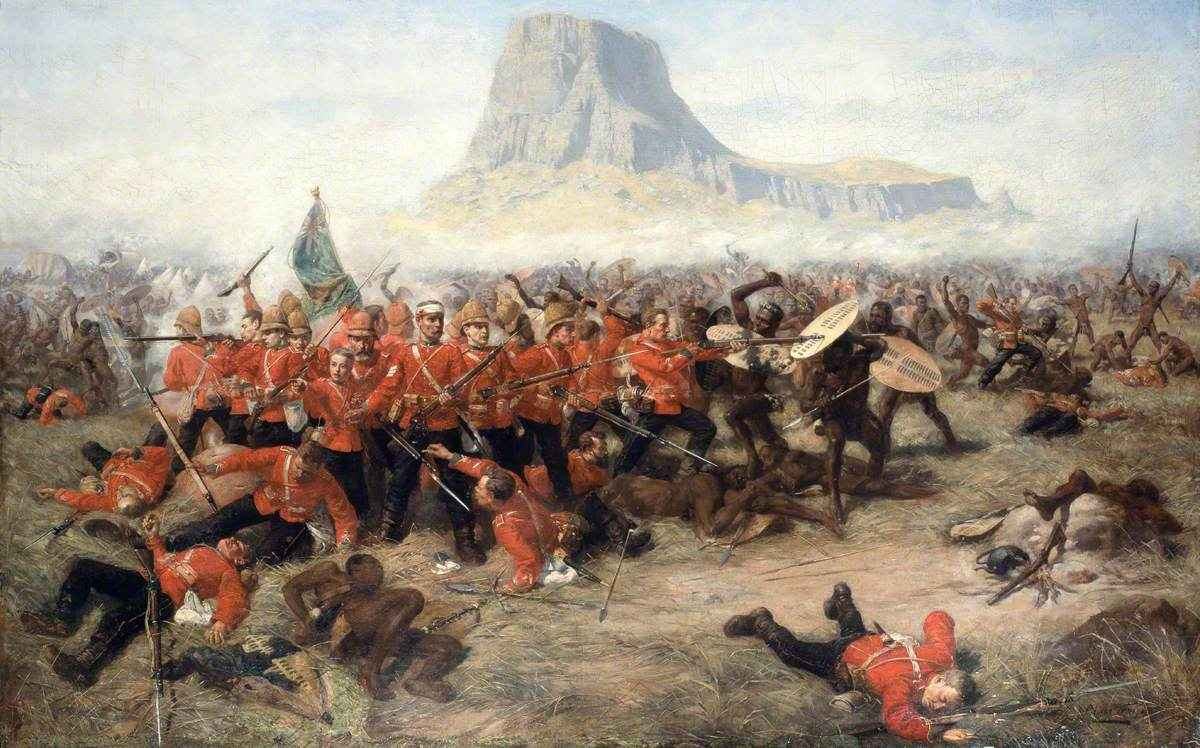
The Battle of Isandhlwana, oil painting by Charles Edwin Fripp, portraying a colonial conflict between the Zulu Kingdom and the British Empire in 1879.

Colonial wars differed from "regular" wars (conflicts between neighboring states) in several ways. The first was that they were more political affairs than military ones. In contrast to regular wars, in which the goals of the belligerents were limited, colonial wars were absolute; conquering powers sought to exert total and permanent control over a territory and its population and ensure lasting stability. In spite of this, resources allotted to colonial campaigns were with few exceptions limited. The meanings of defeat and victory were usually more complicated in colonial wars, as in many cases the invading power would face a belligerent that was not encapsulated by a city, government or ruler. There was often less of a distinction between indigenous citizens and the regular armed forces of defending nations. This lack of centralized authority meant that formal peace agreements were rarely made. Without government structures that could be taken over, administration of conquered peoples and territory was more difficult. To counter this colonial armies would establish or rebuild markets, schools and other public entities following a conflict, as the Americans did in the Philippines following the Spanish–American War. (Note: De Moor and Wesseling label this method tache d'huile and translate it to "oil slick". Angstrom and Widen attribute tache d'huile as "oil spot" to French General Thomas Robert Bugeaud's strategy in Algeria whereby colonial forces would gradually expand their conquests from fortified bases.)

In contrast to indigenous forces, European armies (the most common colonizing forces) were always professional forces, removed from the general population. Tasked with the work of rebuilding and administering colonies, colonial armies were often active while regular armies in mother countries remained idle until conflict arose. As such, soldiers in these armies would develop their own military culture and practices. Most of a colonial soldier's knowledge would come from direct experience and not from a formal military education. European armies were almost always technically superior to the indigenous forces they faced, though this could not always be used to their advantage, as equipment like heavy artillery required roads (often not present) and deploying formations such as cavalry presented great logistical challenges. European armies also maintained good discipline, had high morale, were well trained and were educated in their possible deployments and in performing maneuvers. Regardless of the skill of their commanders, native armies usually lacked such cohesion and understanding of warfare. (Note: The warriors of the Zulu Kingdom were an exception to this standard, being well disciplined and capable of precise maneuvers in battle.) Colonial powers also employed colonial troops in their campaigns, most of whom were of a mixed composition between metropolitan men and officers and indigenous conscripts.

=== Historical era ===
Colonial warfare became prevalent in the late 15th century as European powers increasingly seized overseas territories and began colonizing them. The era of colonial wars is generally considered to have ended following the conclusion of the Portuguese Colonial War in 1974, though some consider the Falklands War of 1982 to be the last true colonial war. Colonial wars are considered to be some of the first instances of irregular warfare and resulted in some of the first studies of counter-insurgency practices.

== Policy, strategy, and tactics ==
"Colonial warfare is the only form of encounter in battle remaining where the forces are sufficiently small that the meaning of conflict is comprehensible to the participant. Whatever else fails, a flanking movement is always possible. In such a campaign you feel the clashing wills of the opposite leaders directly instead of remotely. Colonial warfare retains here what has been lost in the mass conflict of Europe."

— Force Publique Major Antoine Duperoux's remarks to war correspondent George Weller following the 1941 Siege of Saïo

Colonial military practices and tactics were usually regarded as secondary to regular warfare by colonial powers. Due to this emphasis on more direct conflicts, imperial operations and development in colonial ventures often received less attention from the armed forces of nations responsible for them. Locally stationed military officials sometimes developed and conducted their own war policies free from metropolitan restraint. Other times, metropolitan policy was implemented at their discretion. French commanders cared little for state policy when conducting their campaigns in Western Sudan in the 1870s and 1880s, while German soldiers in Africa frequently operated contrary to the directions of the colonial bureaucracy. Colonial wars often strained relations between civil and military officials, who competed for control over policy.

As in total war, invading powers often directed actions against indigenous non-combatants and local economies. This included the burning of villages, theft of cattle, and systematic destruction of crops as committed by the French in pacification campaigns in Algeria, and the Germans in the Herero Wars of southern Africa. In extreme cases, some powers advocated for the extermination of troublesome peoples, as the Germans did following the Herero conflict, resulting in the Herero and Namaqua genocide. Such actions were usually undertaken when there was a lack of political or military goals for an invader to achieve (if there was no central government to seize or organized army to subdue) as a means to subjugate local populations. European powers held the common perception that Asians and Africans "only understood the language of violence" so that they would not be subdued but through heavy-handed means. They refused to make concessions to indigenous forces for fear of appearing weak.

Invading powers were much more easily frustrated when an indigenous force chose to wage a guerrilla war instead of committing to pitched battles, such as in the Franco-Hova Wars or the First Indochina War. Indigenous leaders such as Abdelkader ibn Muhieddine of Algeria, Mahmadu Lamine of Senegal, and Samori Ture of the Wassoulou Empire were able to resist European colonialism for years after disregarding traditional methods and using guerrilla tactics instead. In practice, regular and irregular forms of warfare generally happened within quick succession of one another. A handful of traditional battles were won by indigenous Asian and African forces with numerical superiority or the element of surprise over colonial powers, but over time they faced staggering losses and discouraging defeats. Such trends were marked by the German suppression of the Maji Maji Rebellion, the defeat of the Zulus at the hands of British forces at the Battle of Rorke's Drift, and the destruction of Mahdist cavalry by British Maxim machine guns at the Battle of Omdurman.

Britain and France developed field manuals to prepare soldiers for colonial warfare, whereas Germany lacked a defined system for educating its troops on colonial deployment. Artillery was used by colonizers primarily as a means to demoralize indigenous fighters.

Indigenous forces were usually made up of foot soldiers.

== Americas ==
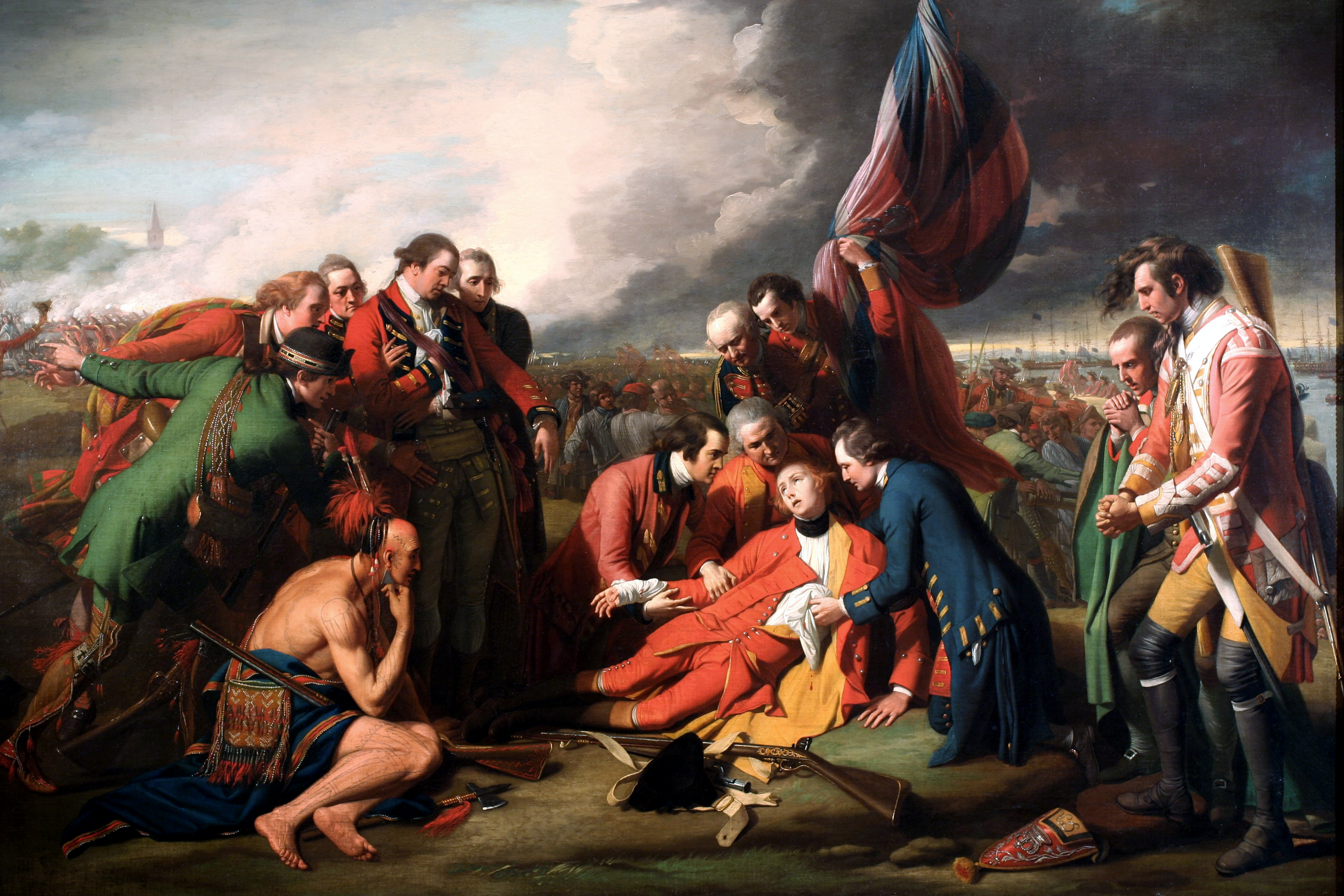
The death of British General James Wolfe at the 1759 Battle of Quebec during the French and Indian War

The first major colonial wars in North America were fought by Spanish conquistadors.

Up until the American Revolutionary War, most of the colonial conflicts in North America, if they were not amphibious operations, took place in the wilderness. Most of the first British colonists in the region were farmers and merchants, not professional soldiers. At the onset of the Colony of Virginia they underwent military drilling and fortified their settlements. However, this practice was soon abandoned and a militia system was adopted. Regular militias consisted of all able males from 16 to 60 years of age who used their own firearms and served without pay. Training was minimal and occurred once a year, at which point militiamen would have to demonstrate their proficiency with their weapons. In the areas under the greatest threat from Native Americans, the militias would garrison several fortified dwellings, though militiamen usually defended their own homes. From these militias, paid "rangers" were hired to patrol the frontier line and occasionally conduct offensive raids on Native American villages.

With the exception of the raiding expeditions of the French and Indian War, the majority of early colonial campaigns between colonizing powers in North America were fought in order to secure strategic forts. The purpose of nearly all movements against forts was to bring sufficient artillery close enough to breach their walls. As such, any typical attack involved the transport of cannon by a labor force, covered by an escort of troops, which would then be used to secure a compromised fort.

On the American frontier in the United States, experienced Native trackers were employed as auxiliary scouts to gather intelligence on hostile Native Americans' positions and movements. Most Native Americans performed hit-and-run attacks on United States troops and settlers, often with horses. If their camp was discovered, their activities would be disrupted, usually via an early morning surprise assault. Trackers were usually native or mixed-race, though some were white. Indigenous people were often demoralized when they saw other natives working with United States forces.

Native American tribes in west were culturally predisposed to political and military independence. In turn, they struggled to unite against white settlers from the east, and were often distracted from doing so by internal conflicts of their own. Some individual tribes even had trouble uniting among themselves. Still, some managed to form coalitions, such as the alliance between the Sioux, Arapaho, and Cheyenne which dominated the northern region of the Great Plains during the mid-nineteenth century. Regardless, all native peoples were at an economic and industrial disadvantage to the United States.

== Africa ==
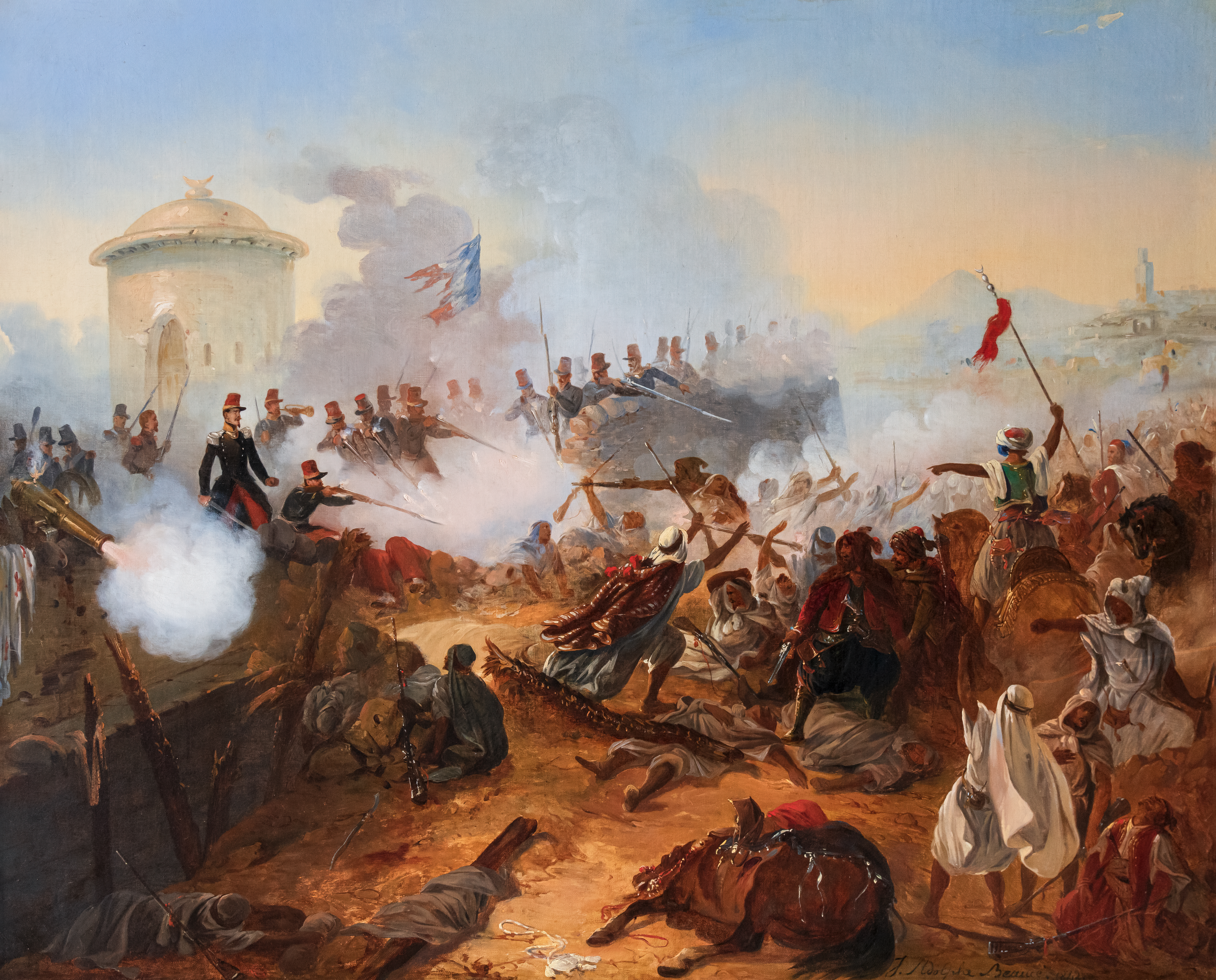
French conquest of Algeria.Captain Lelièvre's Heroic Defence at Mazagran by Jean-Adolphe Beaucé, 1842

The first colonial wars in Africa occurred between the Portuguese and various coastal inhabitants as the former sought to expand its trading empire with Asia. In spite of their efforts, the Portuguese conquistadors were only able to establish limited territorial holdings in Sub-Saharan regions, facing tropical disease and organized resistance from Africans armed with iron weapons. They were also greatly outnumbered and encountered difficulty in getting their muskets to function in the humid climate.

In the 1600s and 1700s, other European powers such as the Dutch, the British, and the French began to take interest in Africa as a means to supply slaves to their American colonies. They gradually established their own enclaves along the West African coast where they could actively trade with local rulers. This remained the state of affairs up through the early 1800s, as few Europeans showed interest in claiming large territories in the continent.

The European colonial campaigns in Africa were generally conducted by European forces with support from native troops. While European soldiers were generally more reliable, they were susceptible to diseases in tropical climates that local Africans had adjusted to, making it more optimal (less money had to be spent on medical treatment) for the latter to be deployed in Sub-Saharan environments. As such, European formations were often deployed on the continent for limited periods of time, while native units were used for longer expeditions. The powers concurred that the "African methods of warfare" were "inherently cruel". Such logic was used to justify the commission of atrocities in conflict.

African peoples were relatively disjointed, leading European powers to employ a strategy of divide and rule, aggravate internal tensions, and make use of collaborationism. In response, African leaders sometimes formed coalitions. General Thomas Robert Bugeaud oversaw the first deployment of mobile columns in a colonial war in 1840 when he ordered formations to raid and plunder Arab settlements to aid in the French pacification of Algeria upon realizing that local civilians were playing a key role in the war effort.

By the early 20th century, colonial campaigns in Africa had become increasingly "modern". Colonial powers were forced to commit larger bodies of troops for conquest or to suppress rebellion, as the British had to in the Second Boer War or the Italians did in their conquest of Libya. Some of this was due to the fact that in many —but not all— places the technological gap between European armies and native forces had shrunk considerably, mostly with the proliferation of quick-firing rifles. Most of this change was brought on by the evolution of Africans' tactics and strategy. They had abandoned pitched battles and had instead adopted methods of guerrilla warfare. In this fashion, the Boers (in South Africa), the Herero and Nama (in German South-West Africa), the Moroccans, and the Libyans all enjoyed considerable success against their opponents before their eventual respective defeats.

== Asia ==
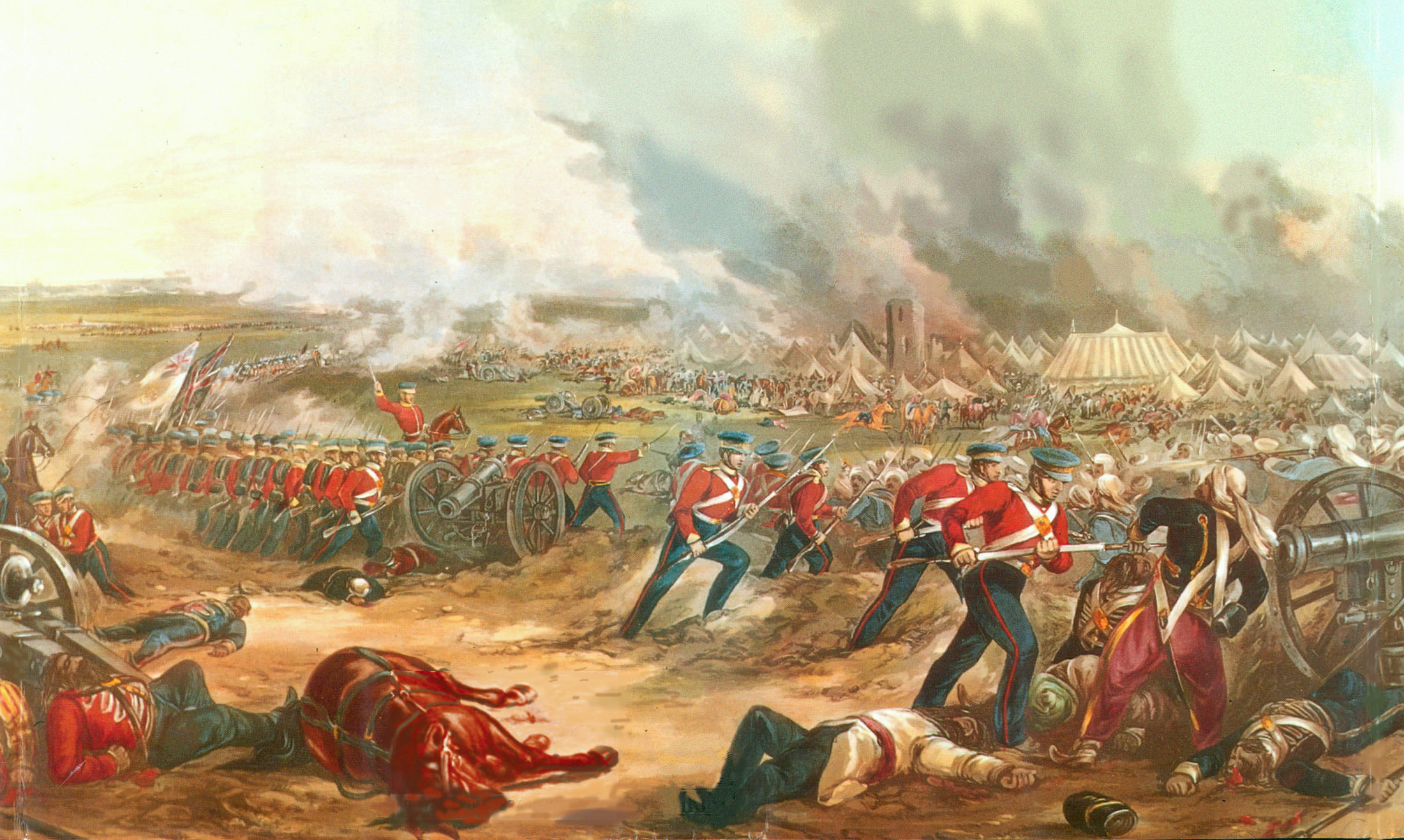
The First Anglo-Sikh War

Asia, like Europe, was home to several powerful empires. Between the eleventh and fifteenth centuries both dramatically increased their commercial activities, especially with one another. However, unlike Europe, Asia's military capabilities developed very little. Most Asian armies were drawn up by local ruling elites from fighting classes of men with whom they had personal ties. They were funded by plunder, rent payments, and taxes. However, payment through taxes was frequently undermined by corrupt individuals in imperial bureaucracies, who would embezzle the funds for personal use.

This changed significantly with the widespread adoption of gunpowder between the fifteenth and seventeenth centuries, giving rise to renewed imperial power in China and Japan. Cannon capable of breaching fortified walls and ending sieges was the principal weapon. However, once the new artillery was incorporated into imperial forces, there was little incentive to experiment with new military technologies or forms of organization. Any major recruitment overhauls were likely to upset local power structures. With the suppression of nomadic steppe raiders (through the use of muskets) and the relatively limited presence of European merchantmen, there was little external pressure to alter their methods of warfare. The Asian empires also began to experience internal divisions. Competition between local elites over tax revenue burdened populaces, contributing greatly to the collapse of the Mughal Empire in the eighteenth and nineteenth centuries. Population growth also strained farmers and their children, breeding sectarian violence in China in the 1770s.

Meanwhile, European states were frequently warring with one another, and developed new weapons and tactics to maintain military dominance. Drilling allowed for the conscription and recruitment of masses of unskilled men who would be disciplined in the performance of maneuvers. New tax systems made it possible to fund standing armies and ensure soldiers a regular salary. Enhanced power structures solidified the control commanders and political leaders had over their forces, making them effective even when operating far from seats of authority. The Industrial Revolution further increased Europeans' technological capabilities.

Ultimately, Asia's antiquated governments and military establishment were unable to match the Europeans' institutions. European military dominance over Asia would become apparent in India in the eighteenth century and in China and Japan in the nineteenth century.

As in Africa, European colonial ventures in Asia were usually bolstered by native soldiers.

== Oceania ==
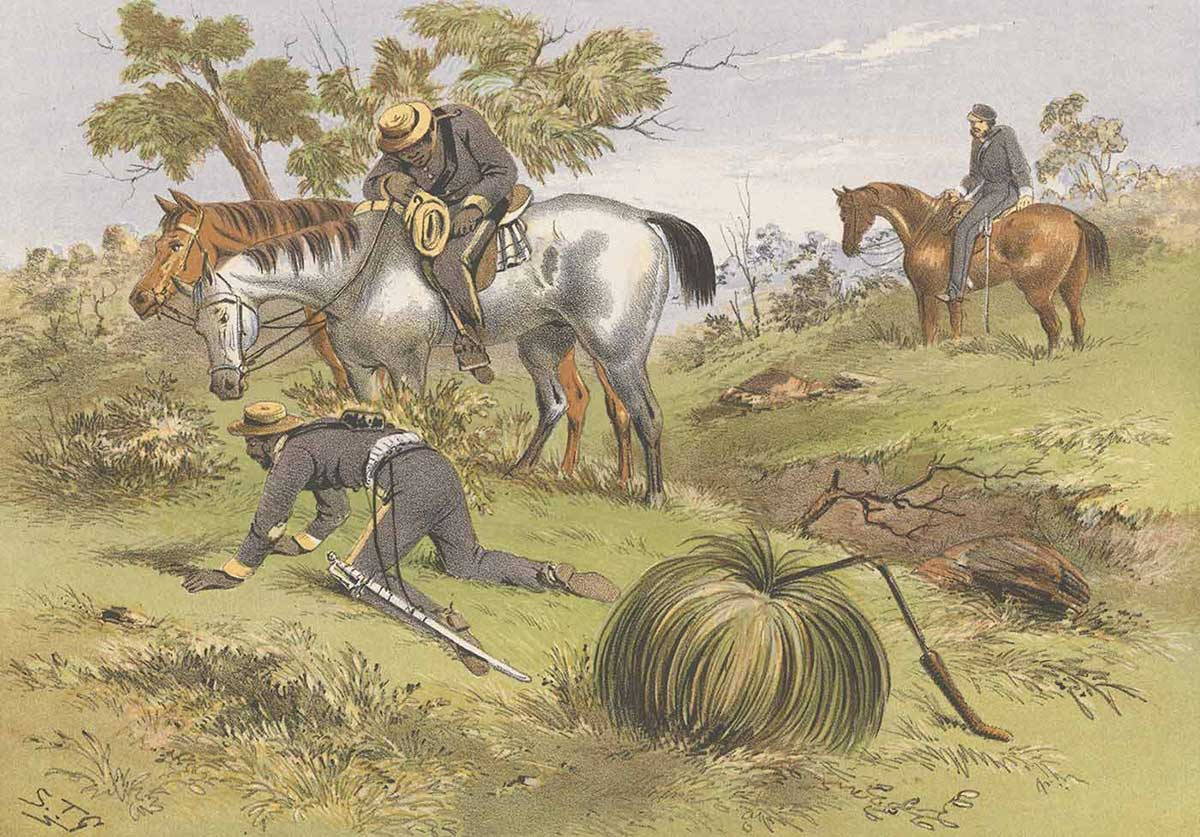
An illustration of native police in Australia during 1865

The Queensland Native Mounted Police Force regularly employed native trackers against Indigenous Australians' communities. The force was disbanded in the 1890s after all of the native populations had been subjugated.

== See also ==
- Insurgency
- Society of Colonial Wars
