= Fall of Mexico City =

Fall of Mexico City may refer to the following historical events:

- Fall of Tenochtitlán, Spanish conquest of the Aztec capital — 1521
- Battle for Mexico City, United States defeats Mexico during the Mexican–American War — 1847
- Capture of Mexico City (1863) by France during their 2nd intervention
- Siege of Mexico City, successful siege of the Imperial-held city by Mexican Republicans — 1867
