= Prayer on a terrace in Bou-Saada =

Genre painting by Nasreddine Dinet

Prière sur une terrasse à Bou-Saada
- Prayer on a terrace in Bou-Saada (English)
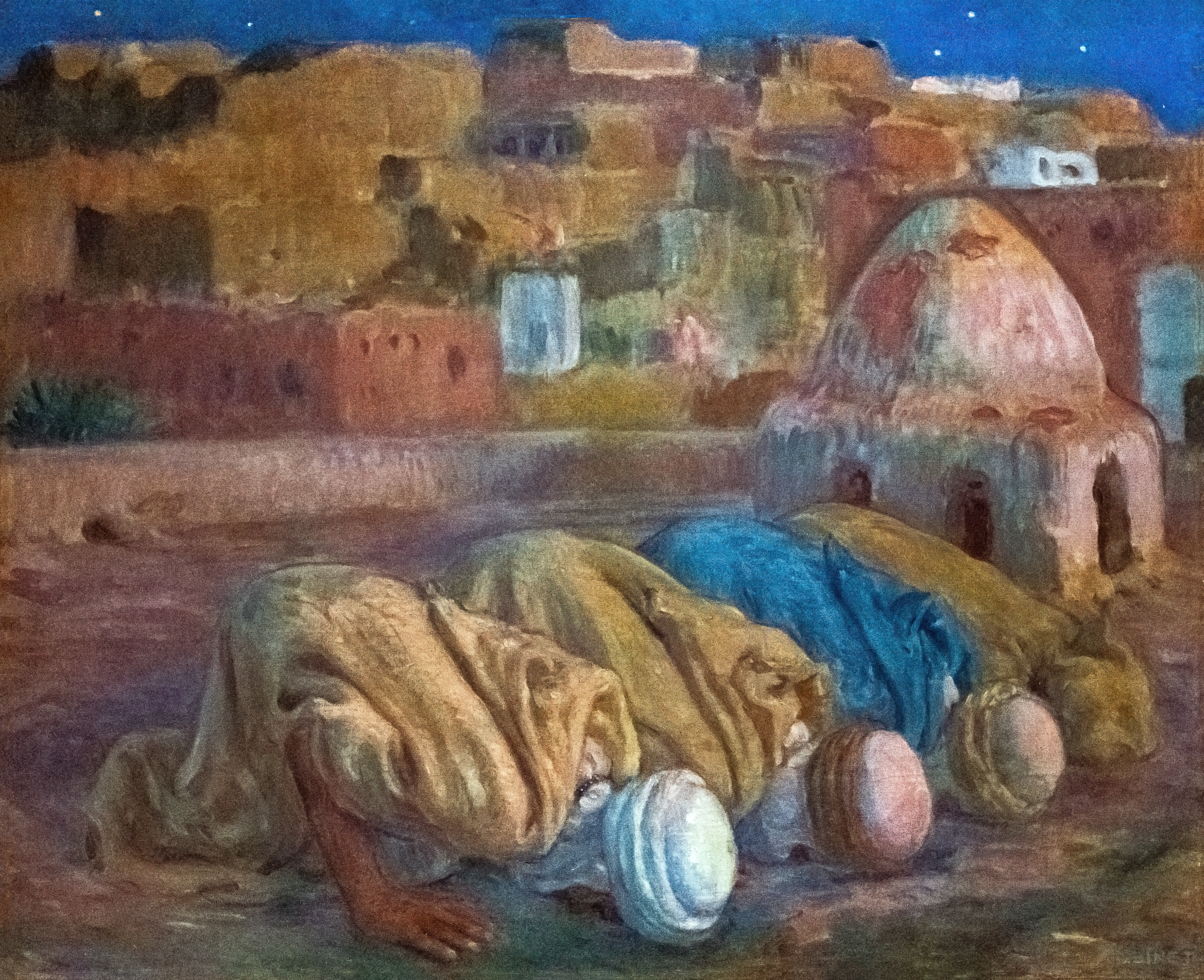
- Artist: Nasreddine Dinet
- Year: before 1929
- Medium: Oil-on-canvas
- Dimensions: 50 cm × 61 cm (20 in × 24 in)
- Location: Musée d'Art et d'Histoire de Narbonne, Narbonne

Prayer on a terrace in Bou-Saada (French: Prière sur une terrasse à Bou-Saada) is a genre painting created before 1929, by the French artist Nasreddine Dinet.

== Description ==
Prayer on a terrace in Bou-Saada is an oil painting created in Bou Saâda, Algeria, by the painter Nasreddine Dinet. It has been housed at the Musée d'Art et d'Histoire de Narbonne since 2006, the year it was acquired by the city of Narbonne.

The date the painting was created is unknown. However, after several trips, Nasreddine Dinet settled in Bou Saâda in 1904 and embraced the Muslim faith, converting in 1913. He painted scenes of prayer and piety—such as Le Lendemain du Ramadan regarding these religious scenes as "the crowning achievement" of his work: "Through them, I wish to share my emotion with everyone".

== See also ==
- Orientalism
