= Capture of Mexico City (1863) =

Events during the Second French intervention in Mexico

- Part of the Second French intervention in Mexico
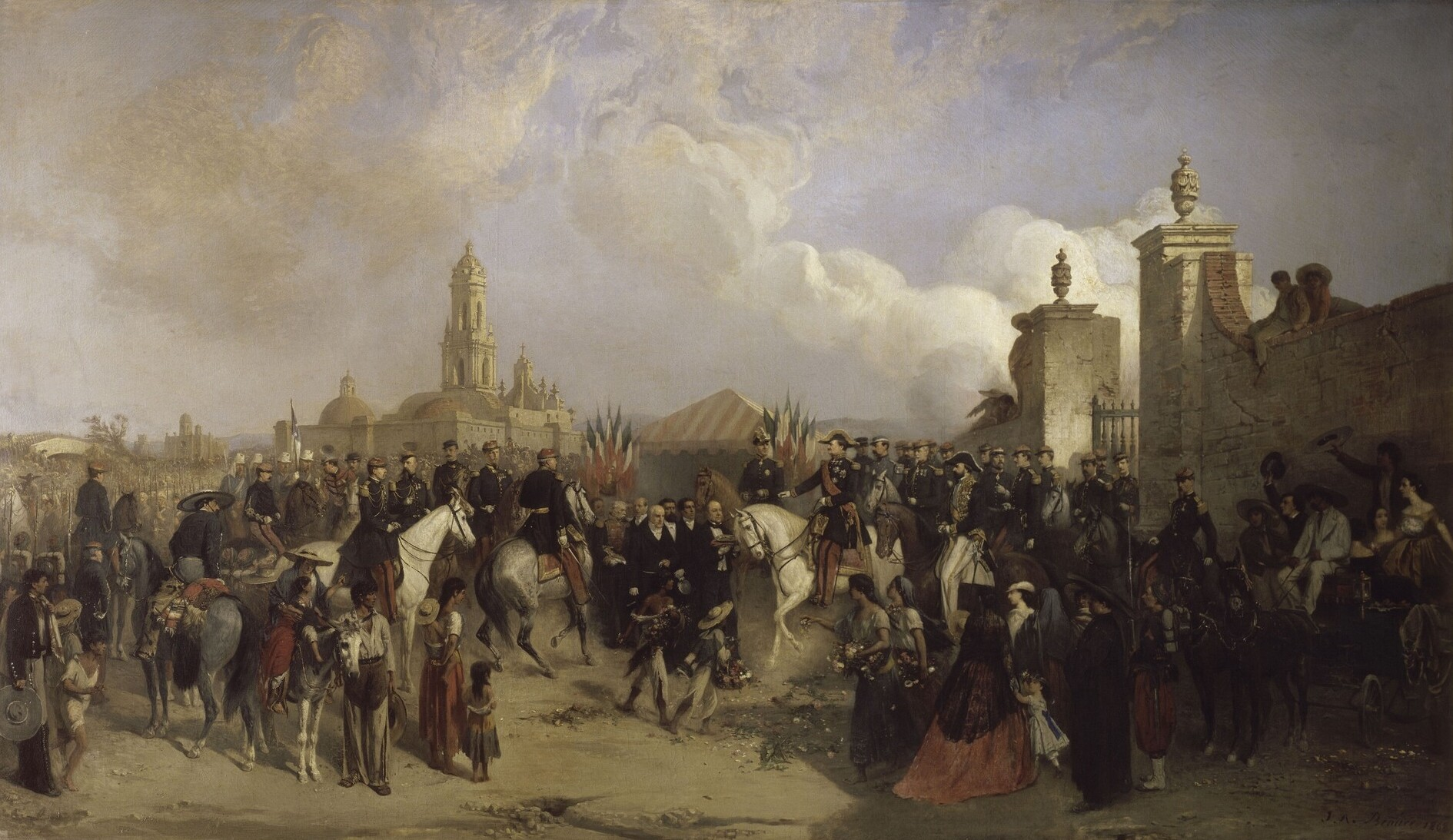
- Entry of the French Expeditionary Force into Mexico City by Jean-Adolphe Beaucé, 1868
Date	10 June 1863
Location	Mexico City, Mexico
Result	French and Mexican Imperial victory

Belligerents
Mexican Republic	French Empire; Mexican Empire

Commanders and leaders
	Élie Frédéric Forey

French-led forces captured Mexico City on 10 June 1863. It was part of the Second French intervention in Mexico.

== History ==
With the French victory at the Siege of Puebla, the position of the Mexican Republic government was untenable and Benito Juárez decided to abandon the capital and continue the war through guerrilla warfare.

As soon as the federal government left the capital, General Bruno Martinez, commander of the garrison of the town, issued a manifesto in favor of intervention, recognizing French commanding general Élie Frédéric Forey as the highest authority in Mexico.

On June 10, the bulk of the French army entered Mexico City under the direct command of General Forey, and captured it for the Second French Empire. Soon after, the French established a puppet state in the form of emperor Maximilian. The war continued however as French forces continued to secure the country and as Mexican guerillas continued to harass the invaders.

== See also ==
- Independent Mexico topics
- Second French intervention in Mexico topics
- Second French Empire topics
