= Entry of the French Expeditionary Force into Mexico City =

Painting by Jean-Adolphe Beaucé

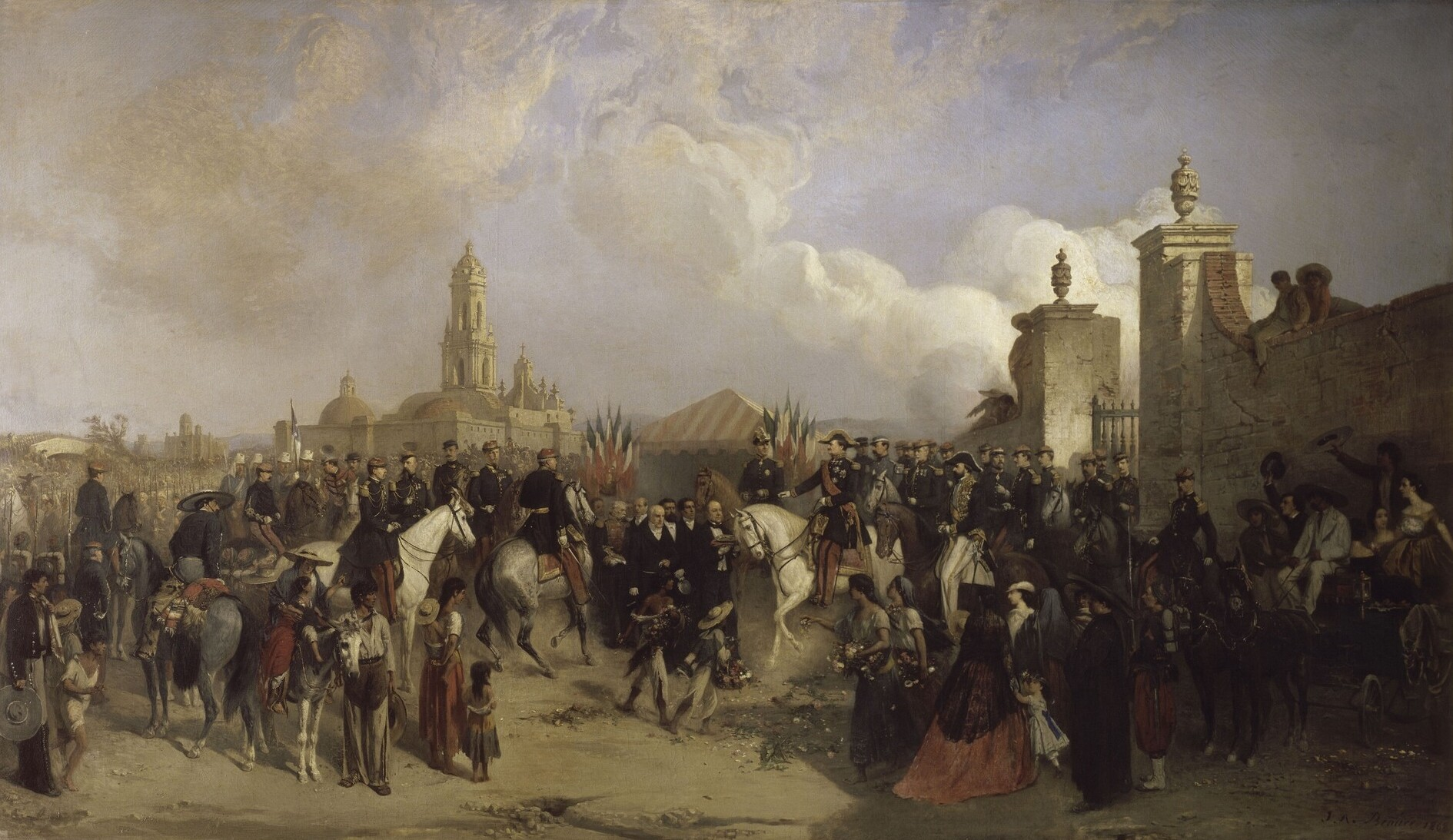
- Artist: Jean-Adolphe Beaucé
- Year: 1868
- Type: Oil on canvas, history painting
- Dimensions: 215 cm × 375 cm (85 in × 148 in)
- Location: Palace of Versailles, Versailles

Entry of the French Expeditionary Force into Mexico City (French: Entrée du corps expéditionnaire français à Mexico) is an oil on canvas history painting by the French artist Jean-Adolphe Beaucé, from 1868.

== History and description ==
It depicts a scene from the Capture of Mexico City on 10 June 1863 during the Second French Intervention in Mexico. This was part of a wider campaign ordered by Napoleon III to install the Austrian Archduke Maximilian as Emperor of Mexico. It shows the French forces under the command of Achille Bazaine entering the capital Mexico City. Jean-Adolphe Beaucé had accompanied the French forces and produced a number of paintings of the campaign.

The picture was commissioned by the French state as a part of a tradition of large, patriotic history paintings. The work was displayed at the Salon of 1868 held at the Palace of Industry in Paris. It is now part of the collection of the Museum of French History at the Palace of Versailles.

== Bibliography ==
- Jonas, Raymond. Habsburgs on the Rio Grande: The Rise and Fall of the Second Mexican Empire. Harvard University Press, 2024.
- Karel, David. Dictionnaire des artistes de langue française en Amérique du Nord. Musée du Québecm 1992.
- Thoma, Julia. The Final Spectacle: Military Painting under the Second Empire, 1855-1867. Walter de Gruyter, 2019.
