= Élie Frédéric Forey =

French Marshal

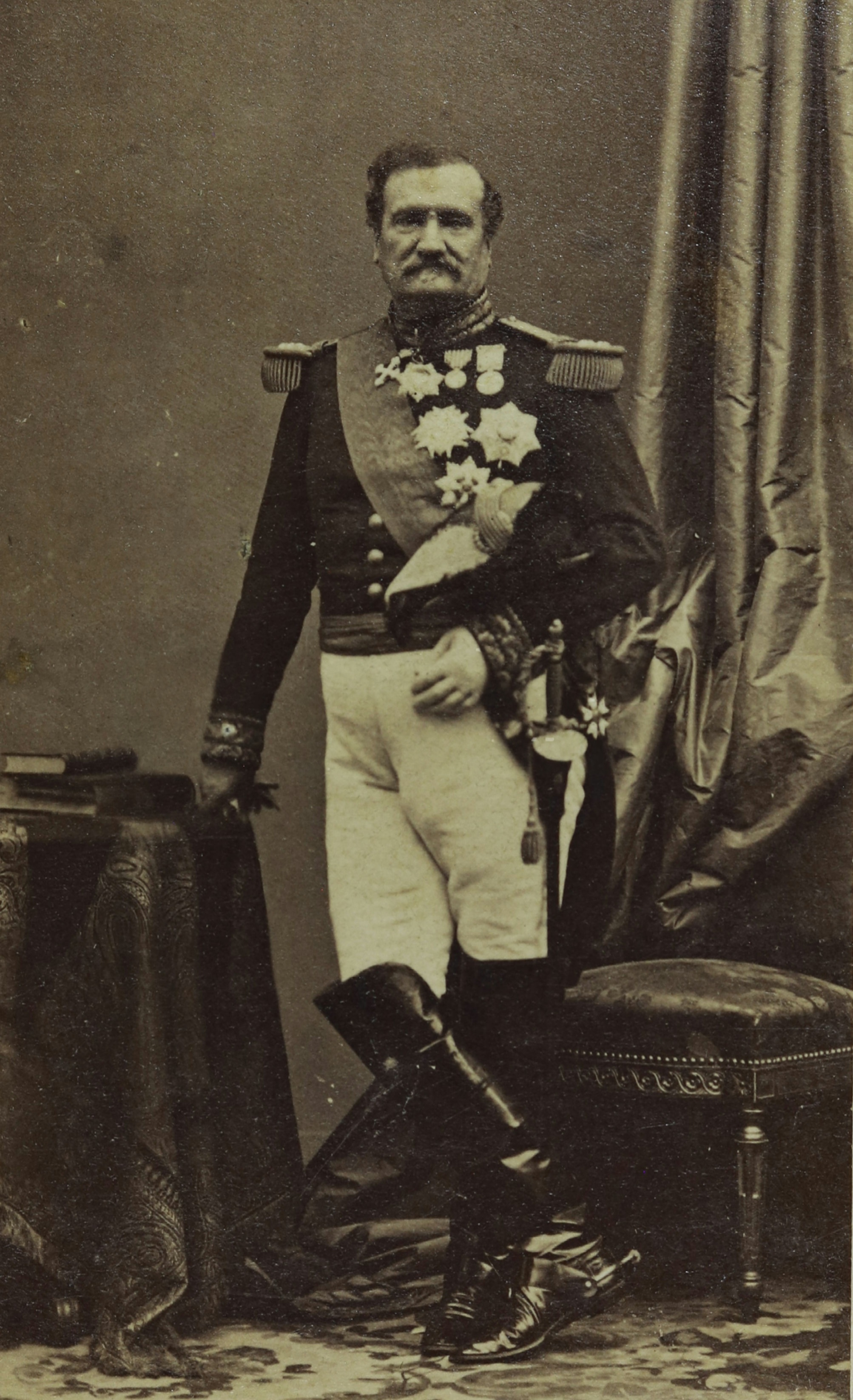
- General Forey, c. 1865–72
- Born: 10 January 1804; Paris, France
- Died: 20 June 1872 (aged 68); Paris, France
- Military career
- Allegiance: France
- Branch: French Army
- Service years: 1824–1867
- Rank: Général de Division
- Conflicts: Crimean War; Franco-Austrian War; • Battle of Montebello (1859); • Battle of Solferino; French Intervention in Mexico; • Siege of Puebla (1863); • Capture of Mexico City (1863)
- Awards: Marshal of France; Grand Cross of the Legion of Honor; Médaille militaire

Élie Frédéric Forey (French: [eli fʁedeʁik fɔʁɛ]; 10 January 1804 – 20 June 1872) was a Marshal of France.

== Biography ==
Elie Frédéric Forey was born in Paris.

He studied at the French military academy Saint-Cyr and was commissioned a lieutenant in the 2nd Light Infantry Regiment in 1824. He served in the expedition against Algiers in 1830. Promoted to captain in 1835, he was given the command of a battalion of chasseurs à pied (Rifles/Jaeger) in 1839. By the time of the Revolution of 1848, Forey had become a colonel (1844) and commanded his own regiment. Forey soon commanded a brigade and in 1852, and was promoted to général de division for having supported Napoléon III in his coup d'état.

During the Crimean War, Forey commanded a division with which he served in the siege of Sebastopol. During the Franco-Austrian War of 1859, Forey commanded the 1st Infantry Division with which he saw action at the battles of Montebello and Solferino, where he distinguished himself in breaking the last Austrian positions near the village of Cavriana.

Having been made a senator after the end of the war, Forey was named commanding general of the French expeditionary corps to Mexico in 1862. Forey—given the fullest civil and military powers—and his troops landed in September 1862 in Veracruz. In May 1863, his forces captured Puebla after a protracted siege and then Mexico City as well. For this, Forey received as his reward the marshal's baton. After having established a triumvirate to govern Mexico for Emperor Maximilian, Forey handed over command of the expeditionary force to Bazaine and returned to France where he was given command of the 2nd Corps, which he commanded until 1867 when after being struck by a blood clot in the brain, he was put on the non active list.

Forey died in Paris in 1872, having taken no part in the Franco-Prussian War.

== Decorations ==
- Légion d'honneur
  - Knight (13 January 1837)
  - Officer (6 August 1843)
  - Commander (25 July 1849)
  - Grand Officer (21 October 1854)
  - Grand Cross (21 May 1859)
- Médaille militaire (13 January 1864)
- Médaille Commémorative d'Italie (1859)
- Commemorative medal of the Mexico Expedition (1862-1863)
- Crimea Medal (UK)
- Commander of the Order of Saints Maurice and Lazarus (Sardinia)
