= The Assault on Zaatcha =

Painting by Jean-Adolphe Beaucé

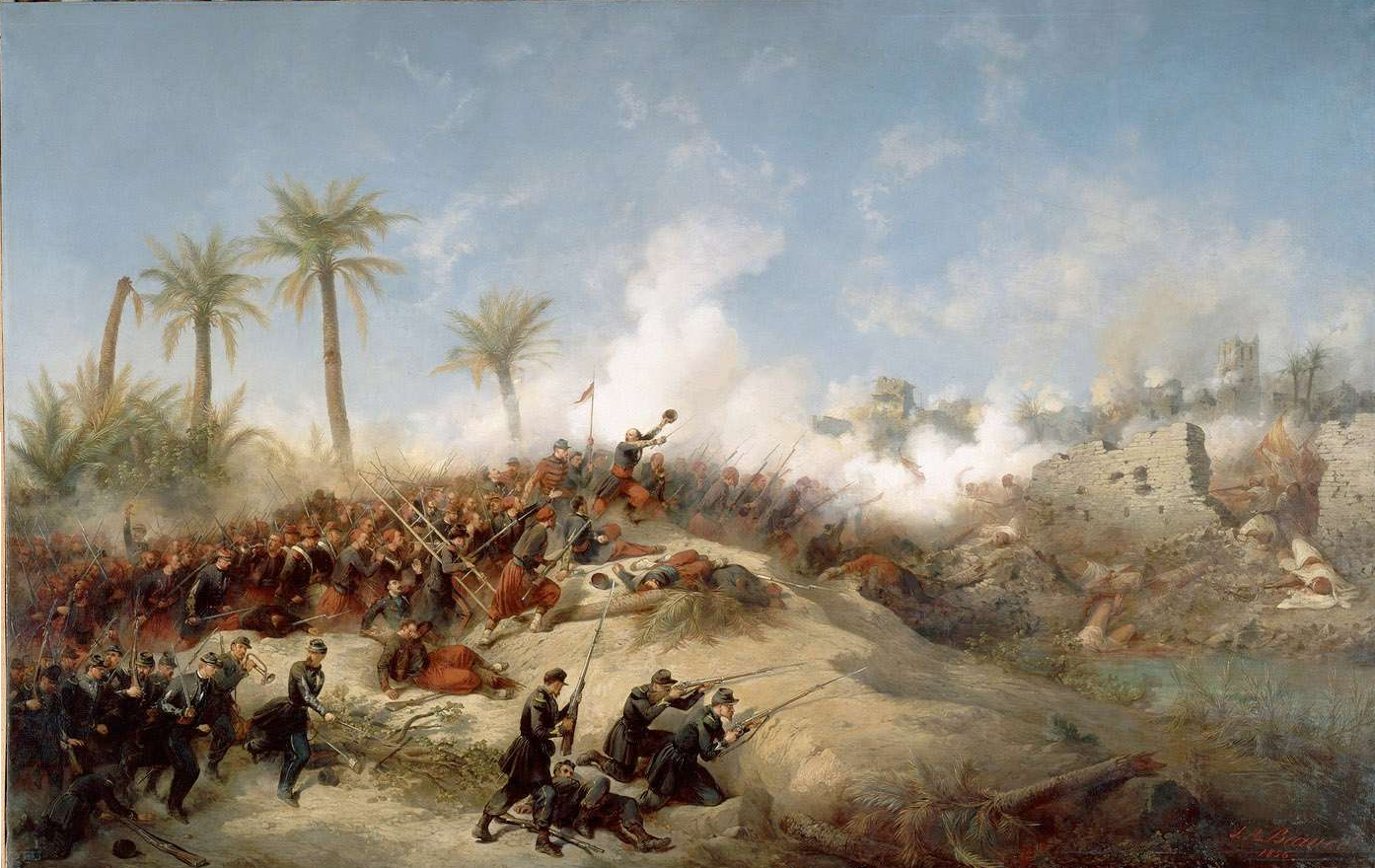
- Artist: Jean-Adolphe Beaucé
- Year: 1855
- Type: Oil on canvas, history painting
- Dimensions: 237 cm × 388 cm (93 in × 153 in)
- Location: Palace of Versailles, Versailles

The Assault on Zaatcha (French: Prise d'assault de la Zaatcha) is an oil on canvas history painting by the French artist Jean-Adolphe Beaucé, from 1855.

== History and description ==
It depicts a scene on 26 November 1849 during the Siege of Zaatcha during the French conquest of Algeria. Zaatcha was a well-fortified village by an oasis and the fighting had lasted since July between the Army of Africa and local warriors. Beaucé portrays the moment Zouaves led by François Certain de Canrobert advance to storm the defences.

The painting was commissioned by the French Emperor Napoleon III. This was part of a wider scheme to produce paintings glorifying recent French military exploits. It was displayed at the Salon of 1857 held at the Palace of Industry in Paris. The picture is today in the collection of the Museum of French History at the Palace of Versailles.

== Bibliography ==
- Jobert, Barthélémy. Essais et mélanges: Histoires d'art : mélanges en l'honneur de Bruno Foucart. Norma, 2008.
- Thoma, Julia. The Final Spectacle: Military Painting under the Second Empire, 1855-1867. Walter de Gruyter, 2019.
