= Captain Lelièvre's Heroic Defence at Mazagran =

Painting by Jean-Adolphe Beaucé

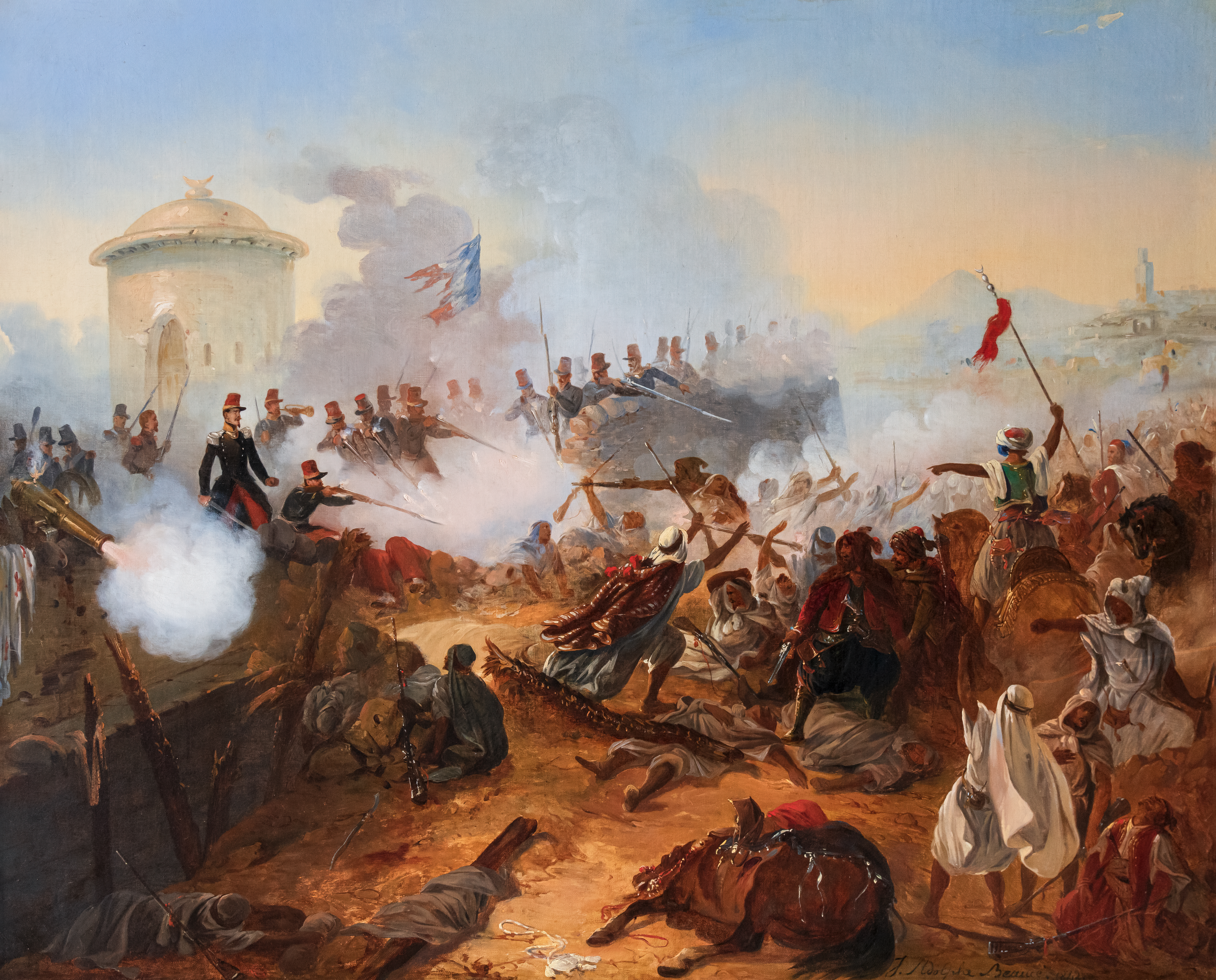
- Artist: Jean-Adolphe Beaucé
- Year: 1842
- Type: Oil on panel, history painting
- Dimensions: 81 cm × 100 cm (32 in × 39 in)
- Location: Museum of Art and History, Narbonne

Captain Lelièvre's Heroic Defence at Mazagran (French: Défense héroïque du capitaine Lelièvre à Mazagran) is an oil on canvas history painting by the French artist Jean-Adolphe Beaucé, from 1842.

It features a scene from the French Conquest of Algeria: the Battle of Mazagran, in February 1840. It commemorates the actions of Captain Hilaire Étienne Lelièvre commanding a detachment of the African Light Infantry, in holding off a much larger force of enemy troops at Mazagran. The subject was a popular one and Henri Félix Emmanuel Philippoteaux produced his own version The Defence of Mazagran.

The painting launched Beaucé's career as a prominent painter of battle scenes and he subsequently enjoyed success with his scenes of the Crimean War and further depictions of the Algerian War. He later accompanied the French Intervention in Mexico, producing some of the best known images of the fighting. Although not displayed at the Paris Salon at the time of its creation, the painting featured at a centennial exhibition commemorating the conquest of Algeria in 1930. Today the painting is in the collection of the Museum of Art and History, in Narbonne, which acquired it in 2004.

== Bibliography ==
- Bertrand, Christophe Algérie, 1830-1962. Casterman, 2012.
- Lepage, Jean. L'épopée orientale. Somogy, 2005.
- Thoma, Julia. The Final Spectacle: Military Painting under the Second Empire, 1855-1867. Walter de Gruyter, 2019.
