= Musée d'Art et d'Histoire de Narbonne =

Museum in Narbonne, France

Coordinates: 43.1840°N 3.0038°E

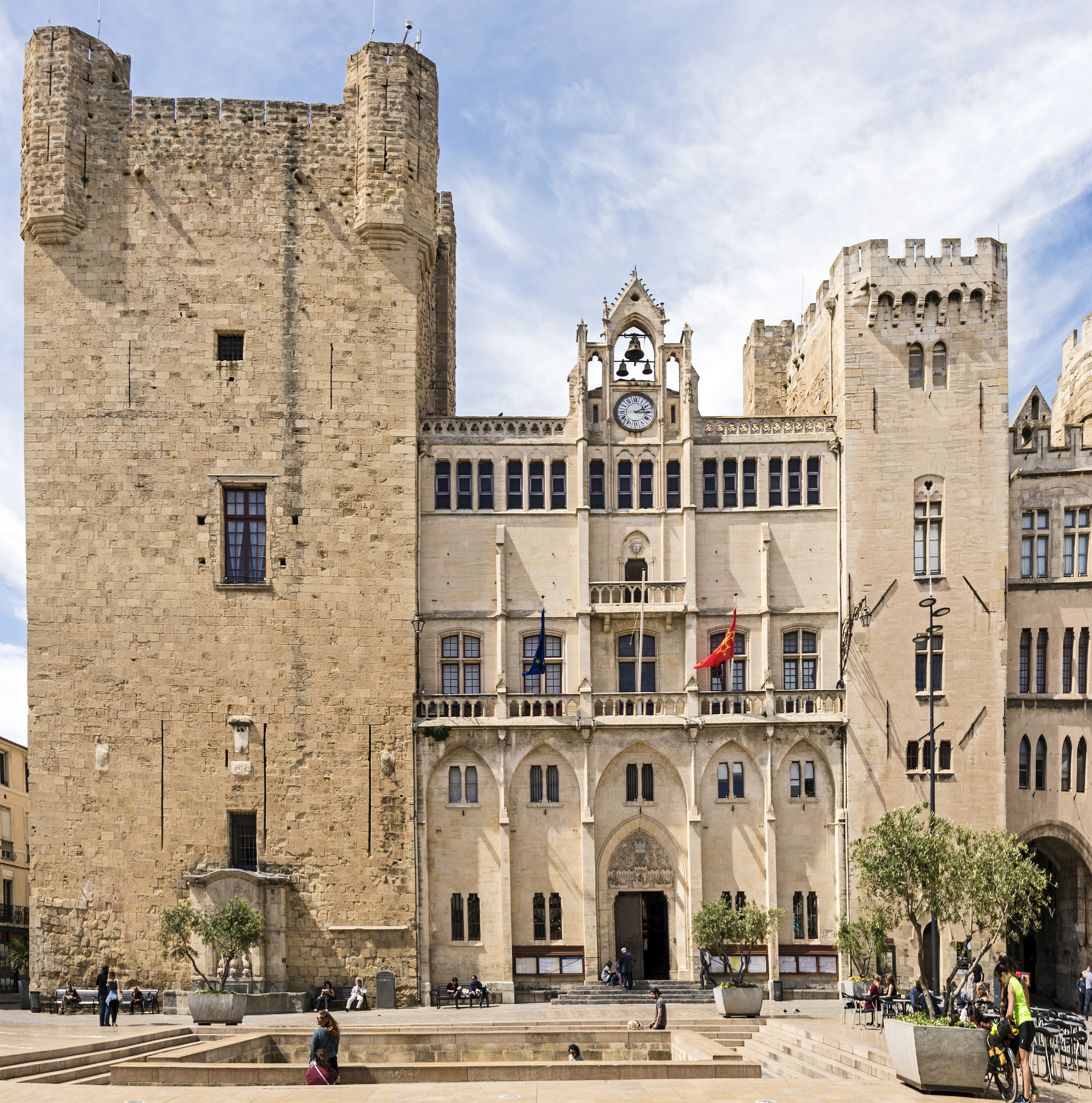
The Palace of the Archbishops which houses the museum

The musée d'art et d'histoire de Narbonne is a museum in Narbonne. It displays the fine and decorative arts. It is particularly known for its ancient faïence collection and its remarkable collection of orientalist paintings. It and the Musée archéologique de Narbonne are the city's two main museums, both housed in the Palace of the Archbishops.

Its collections are not based on a previous collection but began to be formed from 1833 onwards through purchases, gifts, bequests and deposits.

== History ==
The Musée d'Art et d'Histoire was established as an initiative by Paul Tournal in 1833.

== Spaces ==
Housed in the former archbishops' rooms, the museum has important decorative features of its own, showing the building's evolution from the 17th century to the major restorations of the 19th century.

=== Great Staircase ===
- Coat of arms of Pierre de Bonzi
- Buste bust of the Venetian historian Andrea Morosini
- Coat of arms of Claude de Rebé
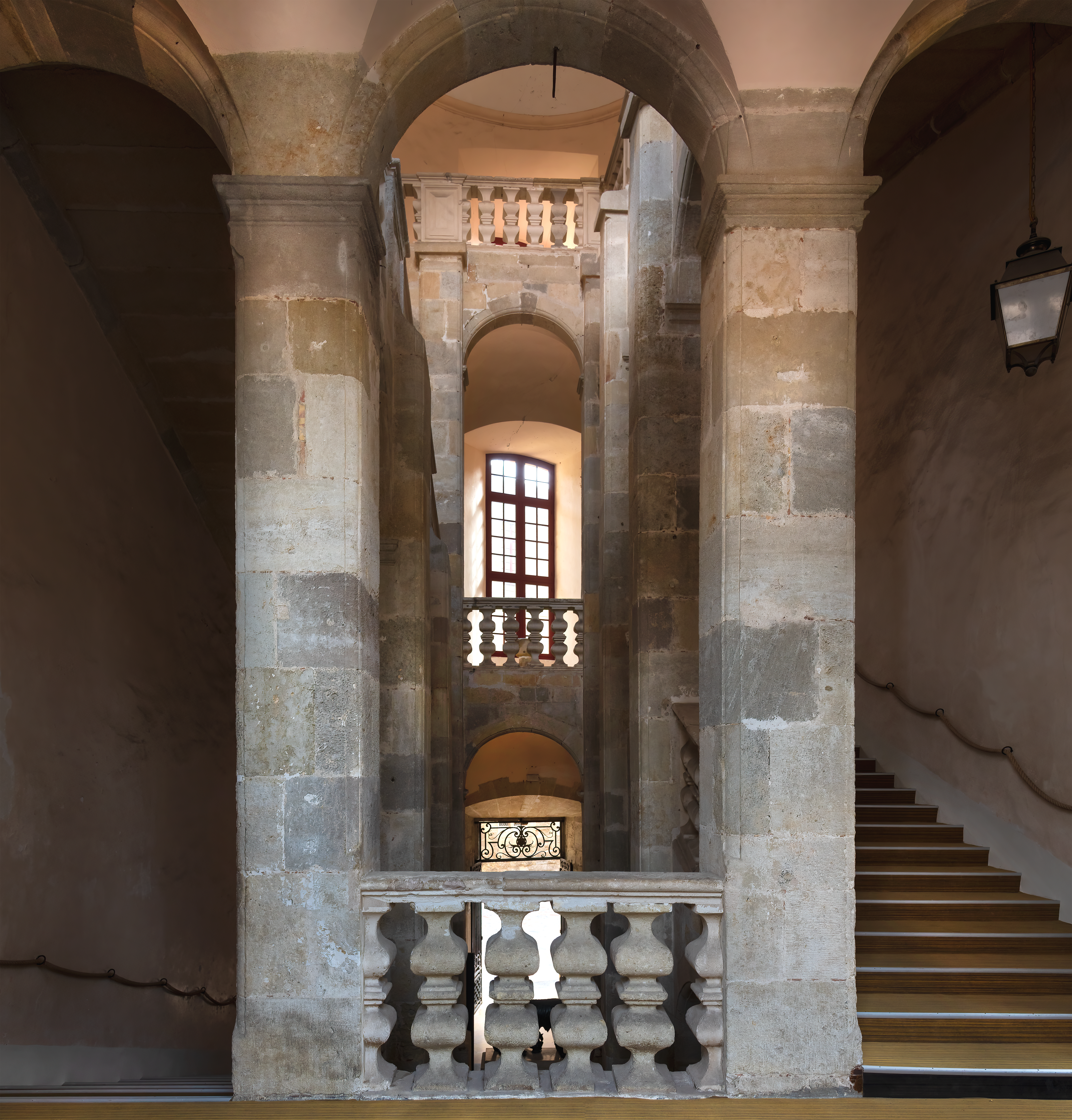

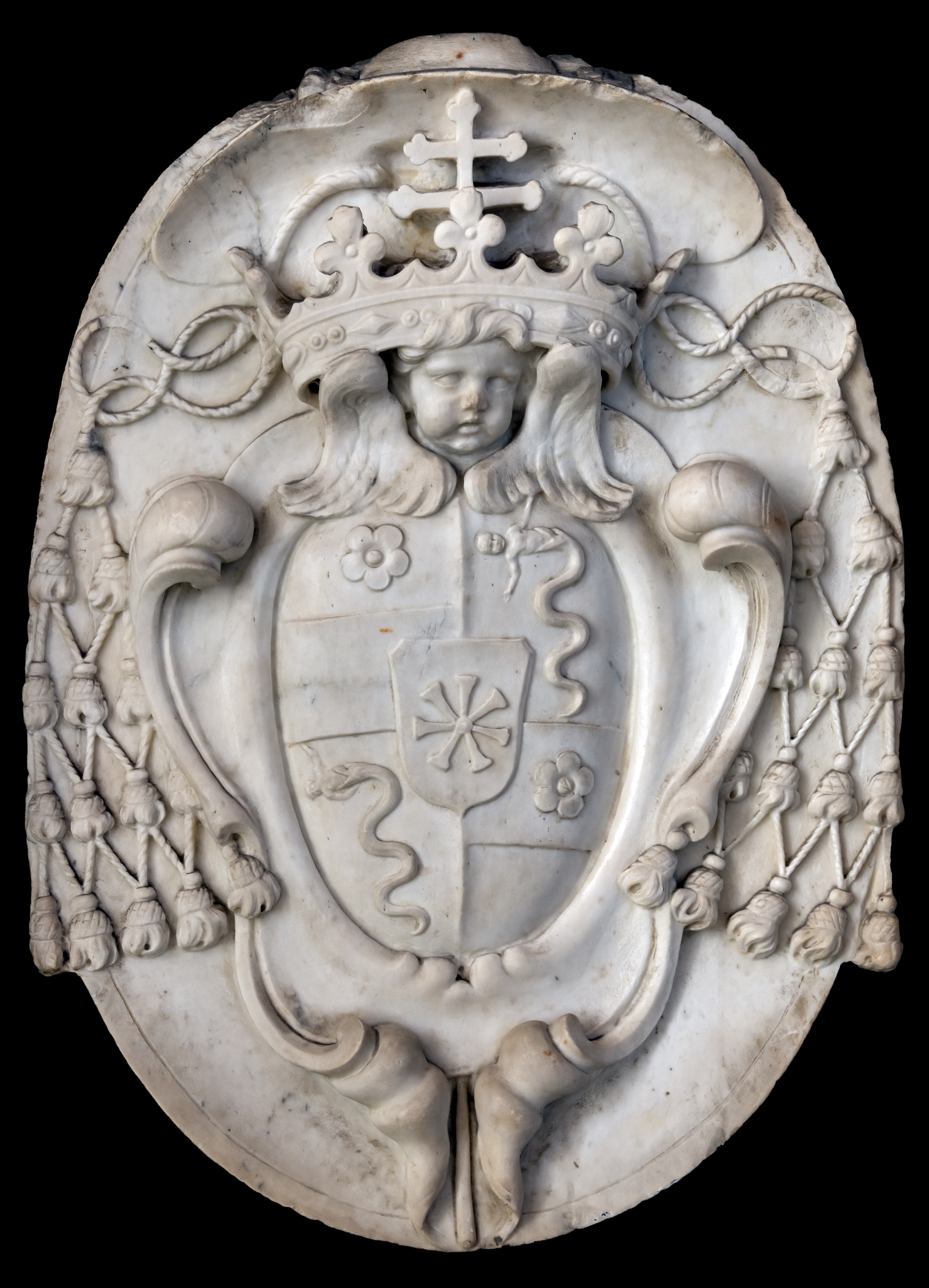
Coat of arms of Pierre de Bonzy

Bust of Morosini

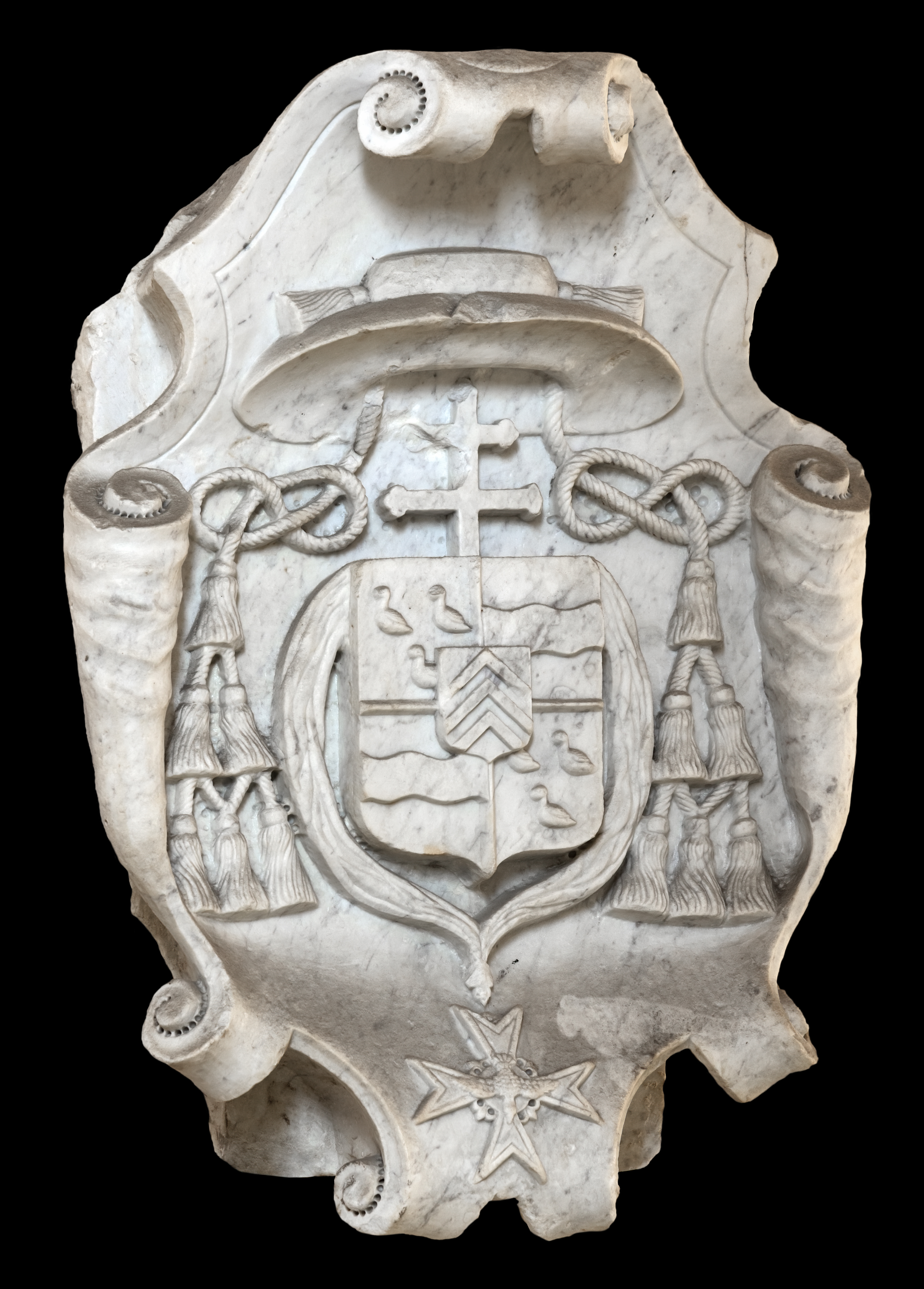
Coat of arms of Claude de Rebé

=== Decorative arts ===
These include ceramics, furniture, miniature paintings and Limoges enamels. The faïence collections are particularly rich, with pieces from the 17th and 18th centuries from Nevers, Moustiers, Marseille and Rouen.

=== Collection ===
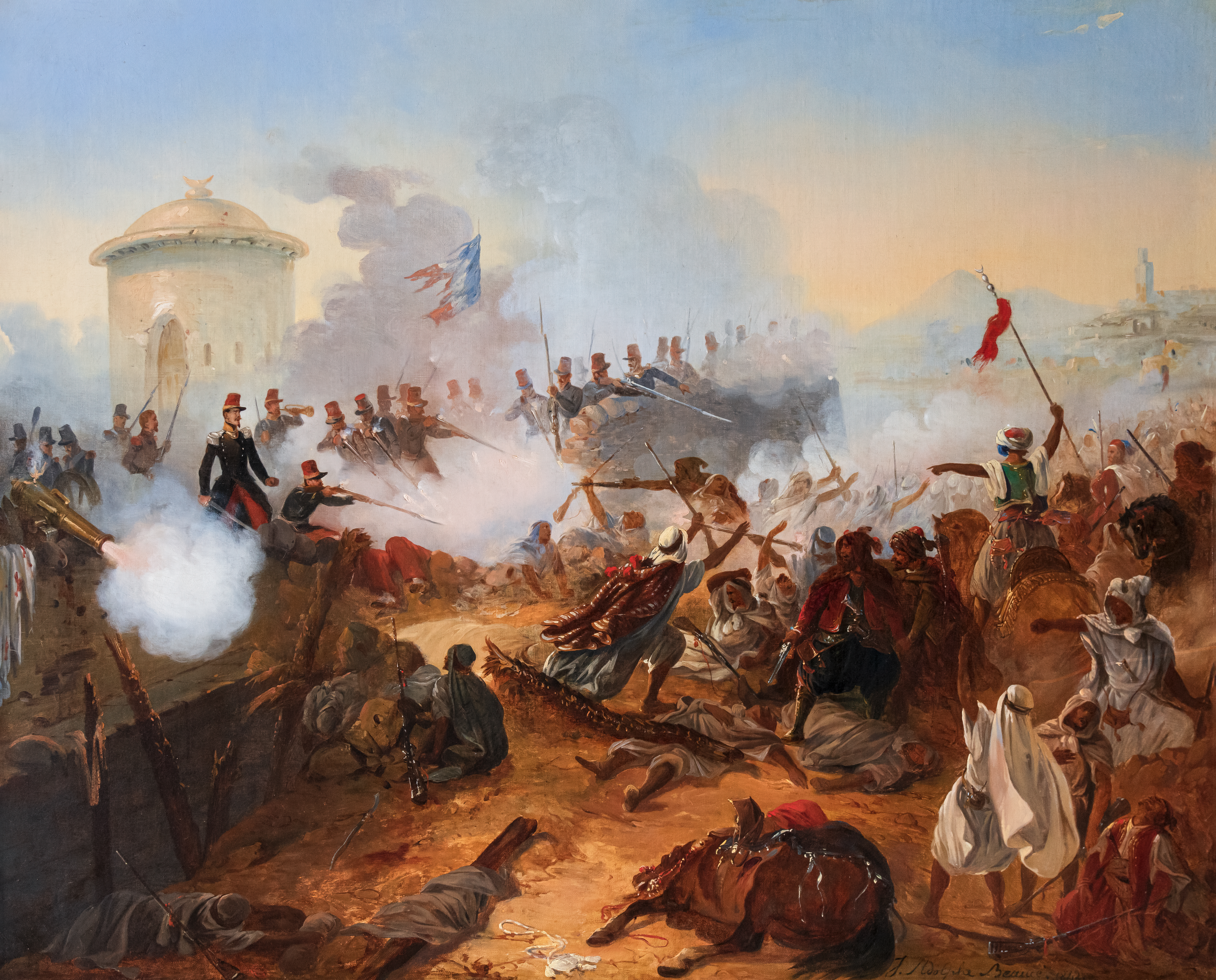
Captain Lelièvre's Heroic Defence at Mazagran by Jean-Adolphe Beaucé, 1842

== Bibliography (in French) ==
- Paul Tournal, Catalogue du Musée de Narbonne et notes historiques sur cette ville, Caillard Imprimeur, Narbonne, 1864.
- Eugène Fil, Catalogue raisonné des objets d’art et de céramique du Musée de Narbonne, Caillard Imprimeur, Narbonne, 1877
- Louis Berthomieu, Catalogue descriptif et annoté des peintures et sculptures, Privat (Toulouse), 1923
- Paul Paloque, Catalogue de la céramique au Musée de Narbonne, Narbonne, Commission archéologique, 1951
- Jean Lepage, Les arts du siècle dernier à travers les réserves du Musée, Ville de Narbonne, 1981

—, Vingt-cinq ans d'acquisitions (1959-1984), Ville de Narbonne, June 1984
—, Lina Bill, Paysagiste méditerranéen 1855-1936, Ville de Narbonne, 1985

- Anne Bousquet and Jean Lepage, Dix ans d’acquisitions, dix ans de restaurations (1985-1994), Ville de Narbonne, 1995.
- Jean Lepage, Le bon vent et le vent mauvais; les souffles d'Éole dans les collections publiques françaises, Ville de Narbonne, July 1999

—, Le Mirage oriental, Ville de Narbonne, November 2000

- Aude Pessey-Lux et Jean Lepage, Georges-Daniel de Monfreid, le confident de Gauguin, Somogy, 2003
- Jean Lepage, L'Épopée orientale, Somogy, April 2005

—, Acquisitions 2005-2006, Ville de Narbonne, December 2006
—, Les peintures du musée d’art et d’histoire de Narbonne, Ville de Narbonne, 2009
—, L'Orient fantasmé, Ville de Narbonne, March 2011

Learned societies

- Bulletin de la Commission archéologique et littéraire de Narbonne

Guidebook

- Narbonne, ville d’art et d’histoire : laissez-vous conter le musée d’art et d’Histoire, Ville de Narbonne, avril 2012
