= Jean-Adolphe Beaucé =

19th-century French painter

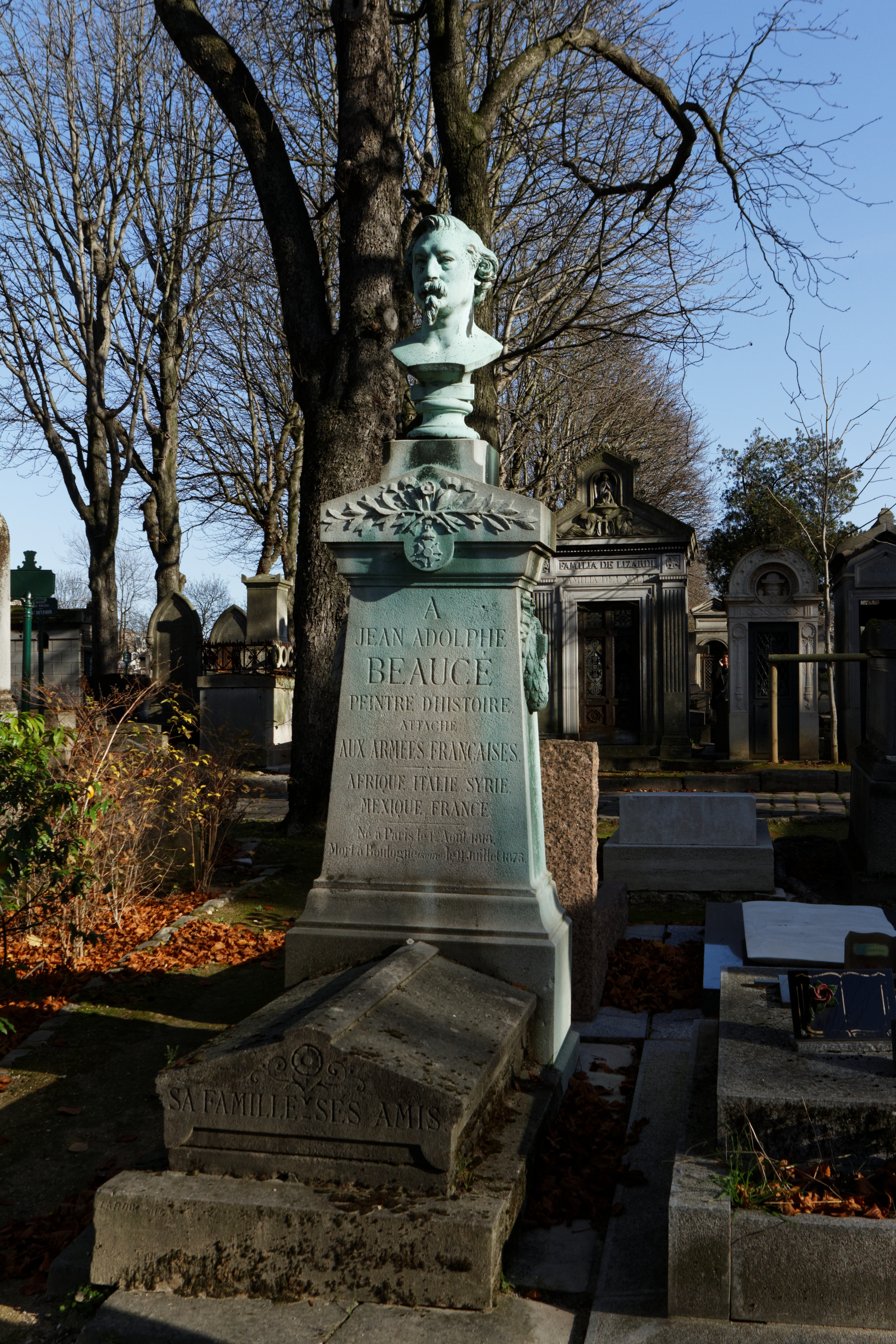
- Beaucé's tomb monument
- Born: 2 August 1818; Paris, France
- Died: 13 July 1875 (aged 56); Paris, France
- Known for: Painter; draughtsman
- Movement: Romanticism

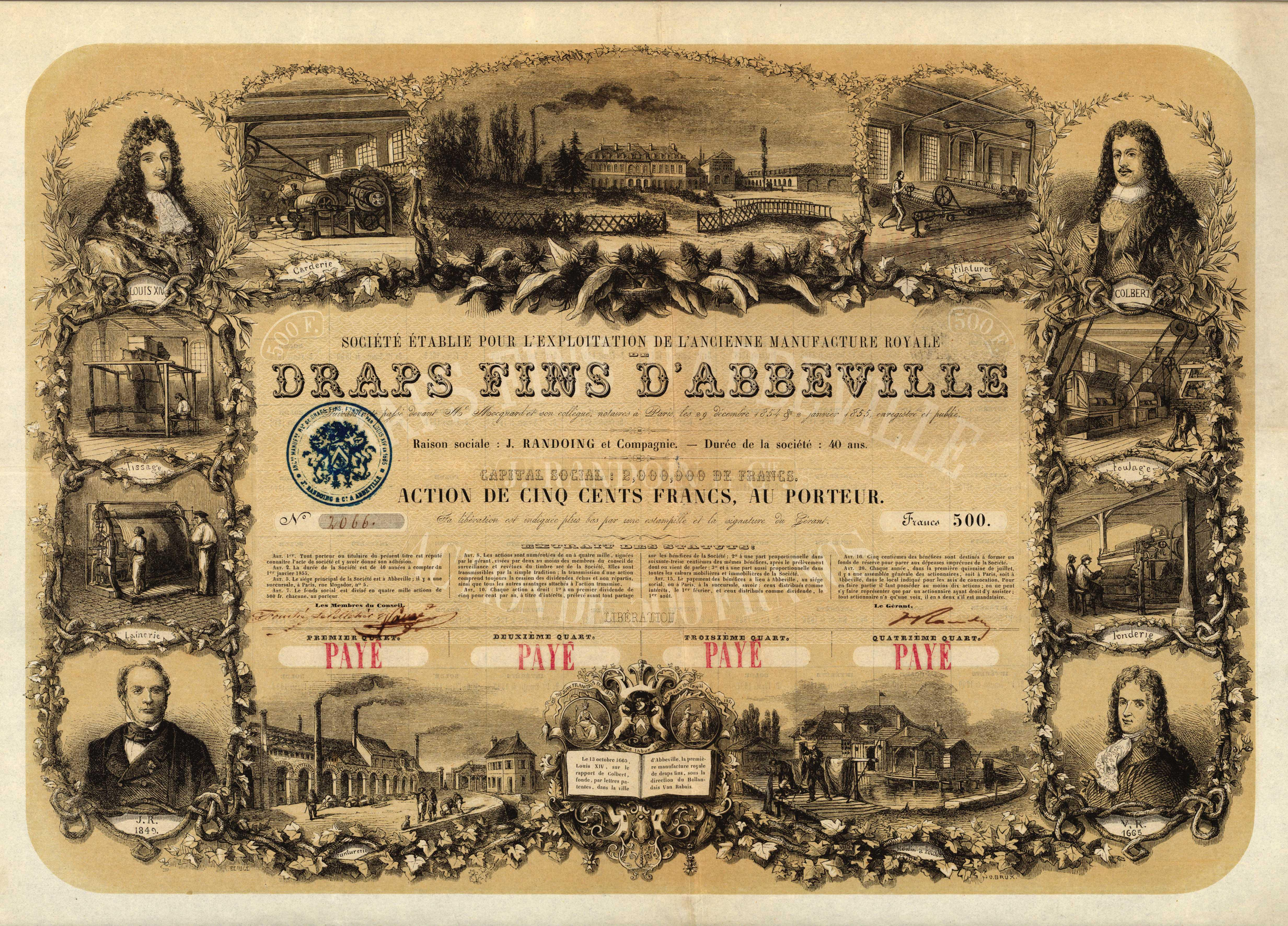
Jean-Adolphe Beaucé designed this certificate of the Soc. Établie pour l'Exploitation de l'Ancienne Manufacture Royale de Draps Fins d'Abbeville from January 2, 1855.

Jean-Adolphe Beaucé (2 August 1818 – 13 July 1875) was a French battle-scene painter. He followed the French army on campaign from 1843 onwards in North Africa, the Middle East and Mexico. He also painted portraits of military figures and created illustrations for works by writers such as Alexandre Dumas.

== Life and work ==
Born in Paris, Beaucé received his artistic training in the studio of the painter Charles-Louis Bazin. He subsequently specialized in military depictions in the style of Horace Vernet. In 1839, he debuted at the Salon de Paris with the battle painting La bataille de Toulouse, 10 avril 1814, where he would exhibited regularly in the following years. He repeatedly accompanied the French army on its campaigns on behalf of the government, creating official depictions of military events.

In Algeria, he drew inspiration for the paintings Prise de la Smala d'Abd-el-Kader par SAR le Mgr le duc d'Aumale, exhibited at the Salon of 1844, and La Charge du colonel Morris à la bataille d'Isly (Salon of 1853). He depicted the Crimean War in the painting Le général Conrobert reconnaissant les travaux des Russes devant Sébastopol (Salon of 1861), and the French intervention in Lebanon found its visual expression in Le Debarquement des troupes français en Syrie, à Beyrouth. Shortly afterward, Beaucé accompanied the troops to Italy, where he chose the Battle of Solferino as his subject, painting La Bataille de Solferino, shown in the Salon of 1861.

Furthermore, Beaucé accompanied the army across the Atlantic to gather further inspiration for his paintings during the French intervention in Mexico. This journey resulted in works such as Le Campement du 3e zouaves à San Jacinto and Entry of the French Expeditionary Force into Mexico City. During the Franco-Prussian War, he was besieged with the French Army of the Rhine during the Siege of Metz.

In addition to his paintings, Beaucé created numerous drawings for woodcuts, primarily for book illustration. These include Jean Bart et Louis XIV, by Eugène Sue, Des Quarante-cinq by Alexandre Dumas, Histoire de Napoléon I, by Paul Mathieu Laurent, and several works by Victor Hugo.

He died on 13 July 1875 in the Parisian suburb of Boulogne-Billancourt and is buried in the 49th division of the cimetière du Père-Lachaise in Paris.

== Works in public collections ==
- Compiègne, château de Compiègne : General Niel at the Battle of Solférino, marouflage on canvas
- L'Isle-Adam, musée Louis Senlecq : François Louis de Bourbon Prince de Conty Looking at a Battle Scene, print
- Narbonne, musée d'art et d'histoire : Captain Lelièvre's Heroic Defence at Mazagran, oil on panel
- Pau, musée des beaux-arts : Portrait of Marshal Bosquet
- Troyes, musée Saint-Loup : Napoléon on the Bridge at Arcis-sur-Aube, oil on canvas
- Versailles, château de Versailles

== Illustrations ==
=== Dumas ===
- Les Trois mousquetaires, Paris, Lecrivain et Toubon, 1875
- Vingt ans après, Paris, Lecrivain et Toubon, 1885
- Les Qurantes-cinq, Paris, Calmann Lévy, 154 p.
- Le Comte de Monte-Christo, Paris, Lecrivain et Toubon, 1860, 159 p.
- Le Vicomte de Bragelonne, Paris, Marescq, 1875, 479 p.
- Le Trou de l'enfer, Paris, Marescq et Cie, 1855, 154 p.
- La Dame de Monsoreau, Paris, Librairie illustrée, 1875, 560 p.
- Le Chevelier d'Harmental, Paris, Marescq, 1854

=== Other ===
- Alain-René Lesage, Le Diable boiteux, Paris, G. Havard, 1849
- Eugène de Mirecourt, Confessions de Marion Delorme, Paris, V. Bunel, 1876, 840 p.
- Ann Radcliffe, Les Mystères d'Udolphe, Paris, Marescq et Cie, 1869, 96 p.
- Eugène Sue, Jean Bart et Louis XIV : drames maritimes du XVIIe siècle, Paris, Marescq et Cie, 1851, 490 p.
- Eugène Sue, Les Mystères de Paris, Paris, [s.n.], 1851, 384 p.
- Victor Hugo, Les Burgraves, Paris, J. Hetzel, 48 p.
- Victor Hugo, Bug-Jargal, Paris, J. Hetzel, 1876
- Victor Hugo, Angelo, tyran de Padoue, 1866

== Gallery ==
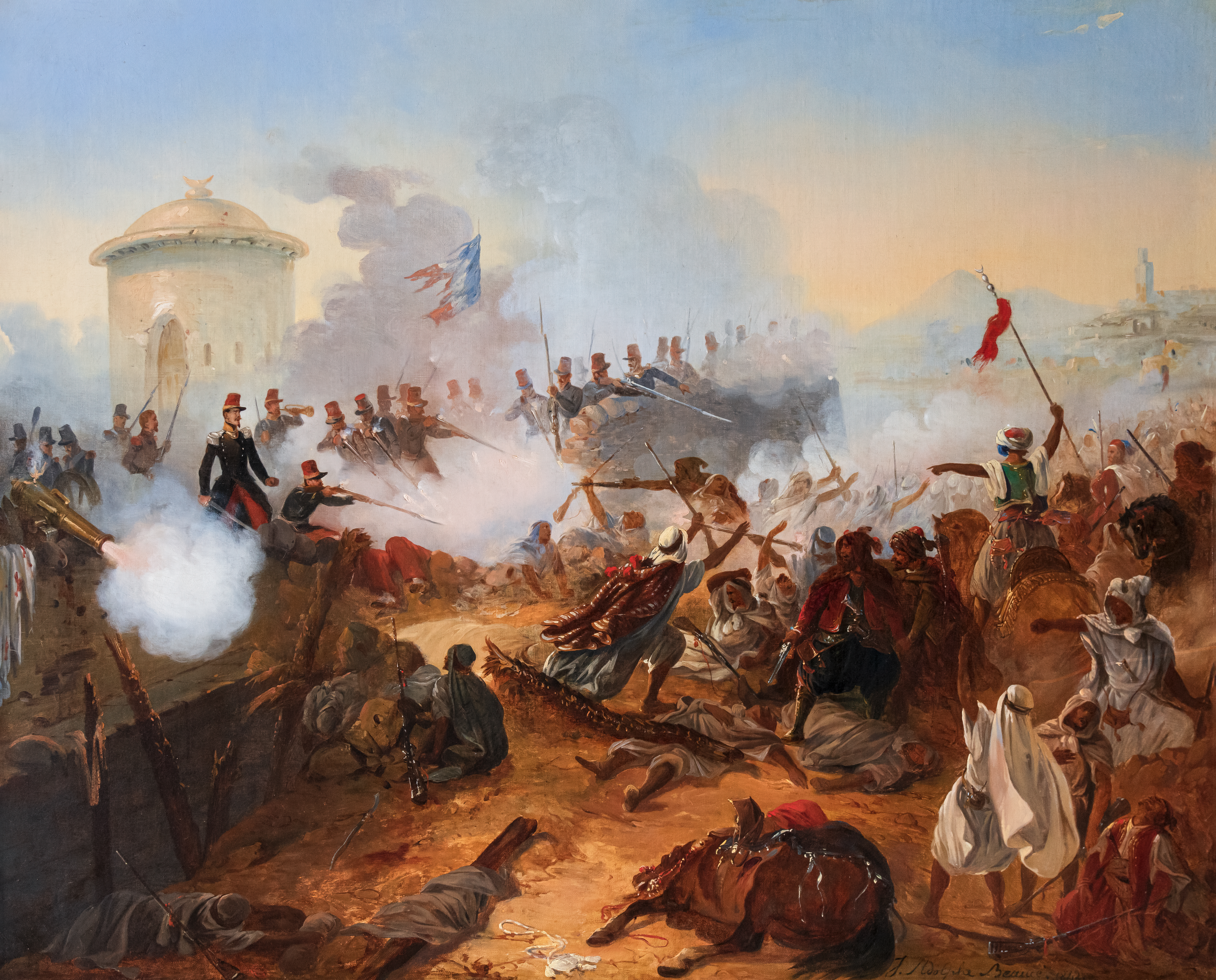
Captain Lelièvre's Heroic Defence at Mazagran, 1842, Narbonne

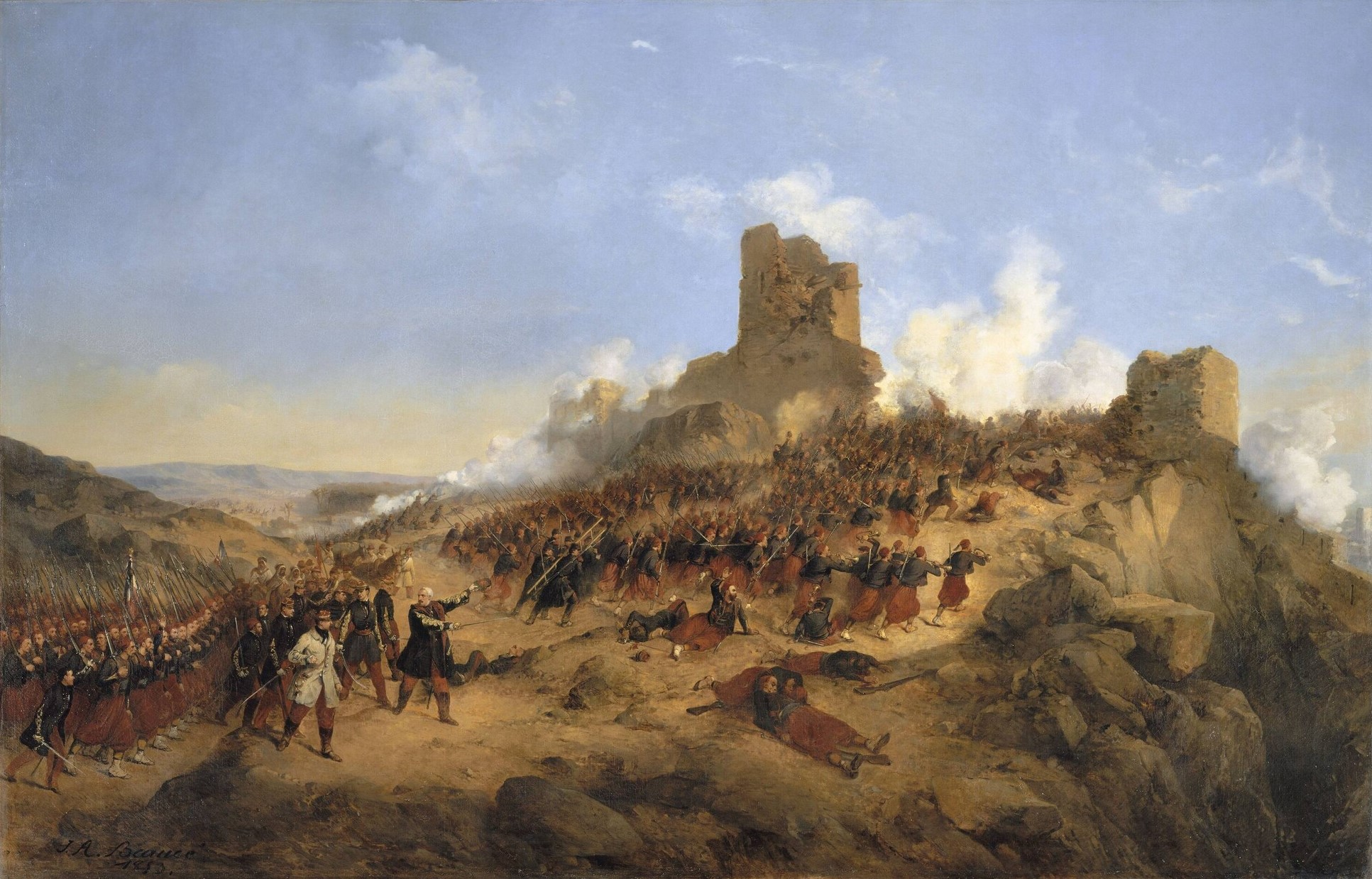
The Assault on Laghouat, 1853, Château de Versailles

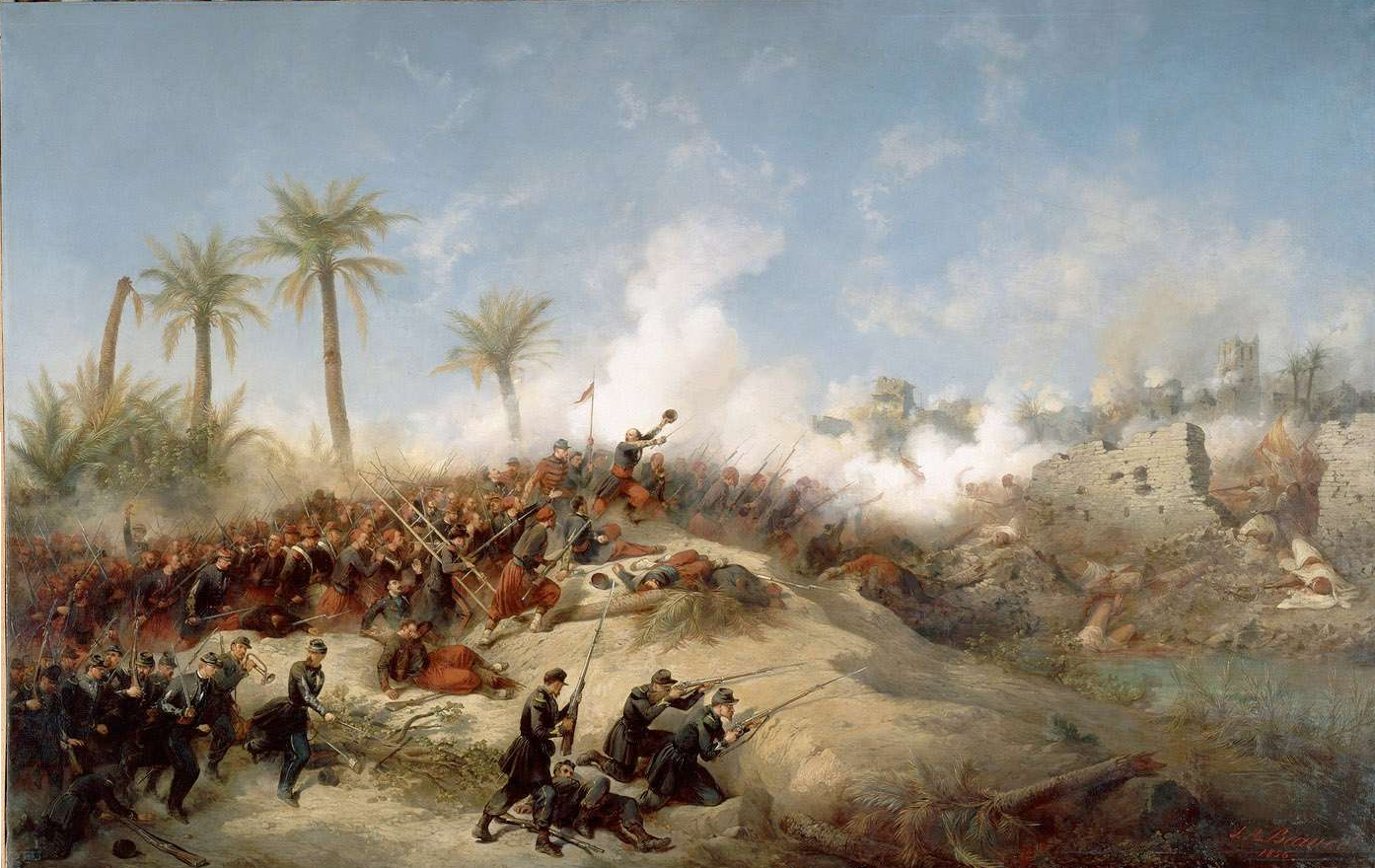
The Assault on Zaatcha, 1855, Château de Versailles

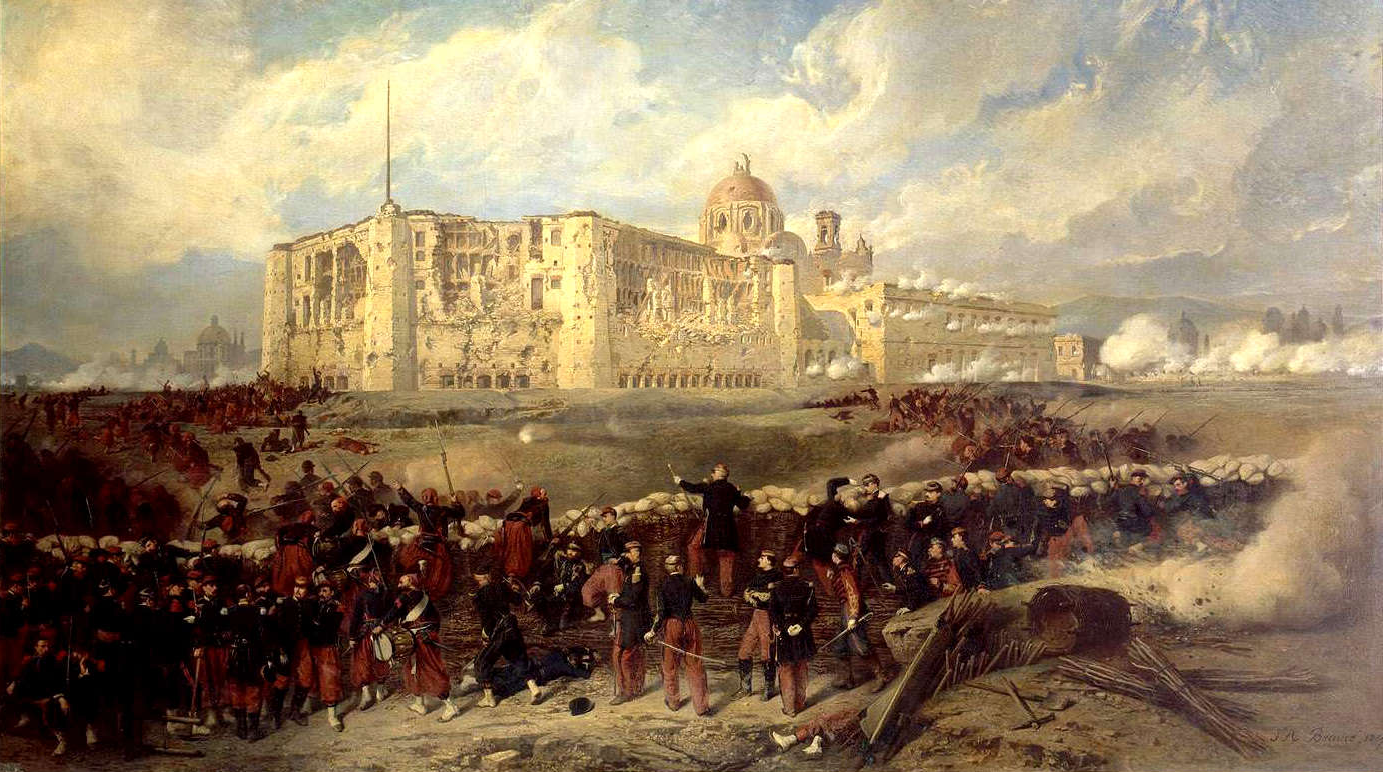
General Bazaine Attacks Fort San Xavier During the Siege of Puebla, 1867, Palace of Versailles

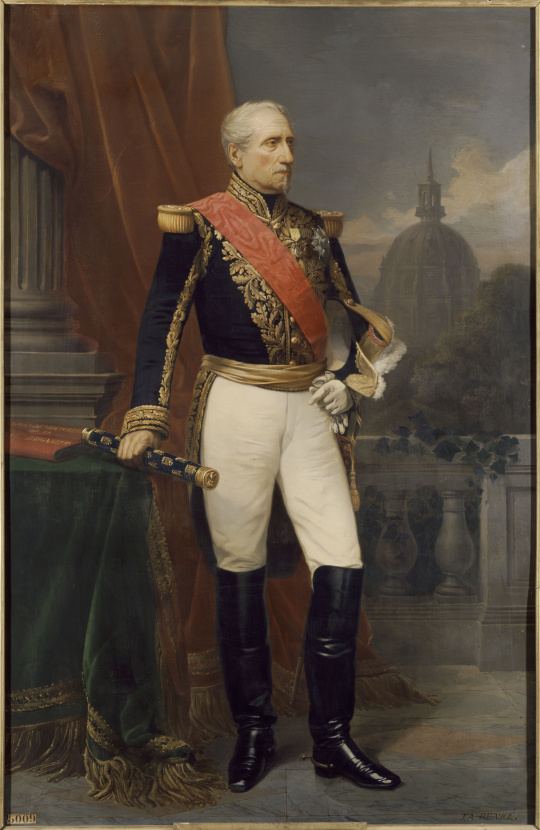
Philippe Antoine, count of Ornano, marshal of France, 1863, Château de Versailles

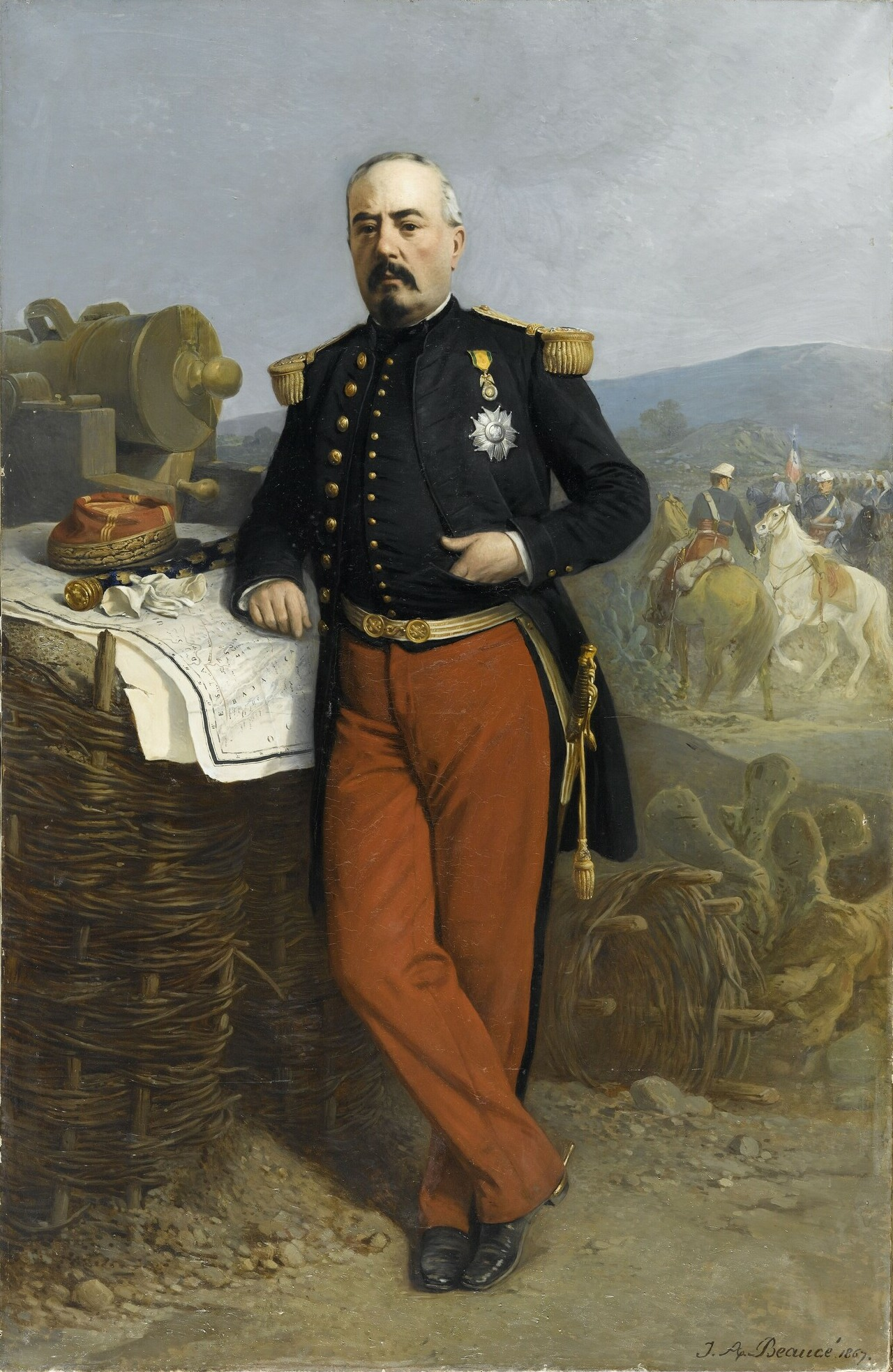
Achille-Francois Bazaine, Marshal of France, 1867, Château de Versailles

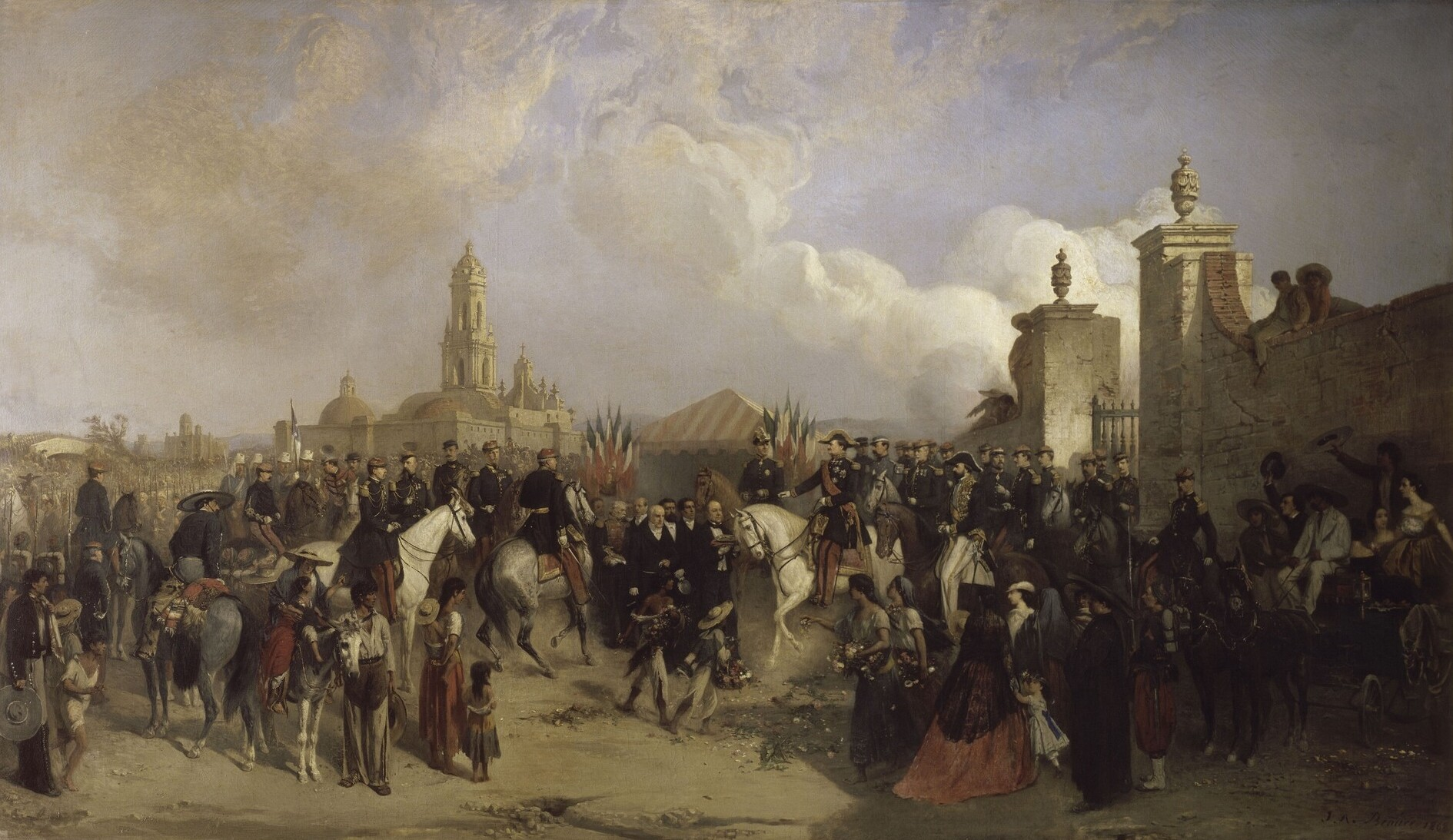
Entry of the French Expeditionary Force into Mexico City, 1868, Château de Versailles

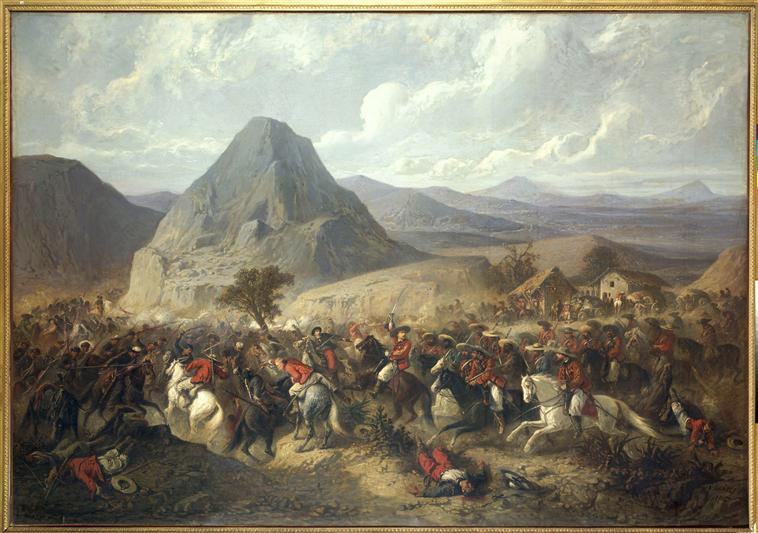
Battle of Hierba-Buena, 1868, Musée de l'Armée, Paris

== Bibliography ==
- (in French) 'Beaucé, Jean-Adolphe' in David Karel, Dictionnaire des artistes de langue française en Amérique du Nord: peintres, sculpteurs, dessinateurs, graveurs, photographes et orfèvres, Presses Université Laval, 1992. (ISBN 9782763772356)
- 'Jean-Adolphe Beaucé', extract from the Dictionnaire Bénézit, on Oxford Index, 2006 (ISBN 9780199773787)
