= Lakhdar =

Lakhdar is an Arabic masculine given name and surname. Notable people with the name include:

== Given name ==
- Lakhdar Adjali (born 1972), Algerian football manager and former player
- Lakhdar Belloumi (born 1958), former Algerian football player and manager
- Lakhdar Ben Tobbal (1923–2010), Algerian resistance fighter
- Lakhdar Bentaleb (born 1988), Algerian football player
- Lakhdar Boumediene (born 1966), citizen of Bosnia and Herzegovina, held in the United States Guantanamo Bay detention camps
- Lakhdar Bouyahi (1946–2025), Algerian footballer
- Lakhdar Brahimi (born 1934), Algerian diplomat, served as the United Nations and Arab League Special Envoy to Syria until 2014
- Mohamed Lakhdar Maougal, Algerian philosopher

== Surname ==
- Lafif Lakhdar (1934–2013), French-Tunisian writer and journalist
- Mohammed Lakhdar-Hamina (1934–2025), Algerian film director and screenwriter
- Ziad Lakhdar, Tunisian politician

== See also ==
- Sidi Lakhdar District, district in Mostaganem Province, Algeria
- Bekkouche Lakhdar, town and commune in Skikda Province in northeastern Algeria
- Jbel Lakhdar, small mountain or hill in Morocco
- Kef Lakhdar, town and commune in Médéa Province, Algeria
- Loued Lakhdar, small town and rural commune in Morocco
- Sidi Lakhdar, town in the Mostaganem Province, Algeria
- Sidi Lakhdar, Mostaganem, town and commune in Mostaganem Province, Algeria
- Oued lakhdar, town and commune in Tlemcen Province in northwestern Algeria
- Lakhdar Brahimi Syrian peace plan, joint UN-Arab League peace mission headed by Lakhdar Brahimi
- Lakhdaria
