= Achacha, Algeria =

Achacha
- Commune and town
- Location of Achacha within Mostaganem Province

- Location of Achacha within Algeria
- Coordinates: 36°14′46″N 0°38′6″E
- Country: Algeria
- Province: Mostaganem Province
- District: Achacha District

Population (1998)
  - Total: 31,360
- Time zone: UTC+1 (CET)

Achacha is a town and commune in Mostaganem Province, northwestern Algeria. It is the capital of Achacha District. According to the 1998 census it has a population of 31,360. The town is one of four other known towns within Achacha District, Khadra, Nekmaria and Ouled Boughalem.
