= Sidi El Houari =

Algerian Imam

Sidi El Houari سيدي الهواري
- Mausoleum of Sidi El Houari in Oran

Personal life
- Born: Mohamed ben Omar el-Houari; 1350 Sour, Ain Tedles, Wilaya of Mostaganem
- Died: 12 September 1439 (aged 88–89) Oran

Religious life
- Religion: Islam
- Denomination: Sunni
- Jurisprudence: Maliki
- Tariqa: Shadhili
- Creed: Ash'ari

Muslim leader
- Influenced: Ibrahim Tazi

Sidi El Houari (1350 – 12 September 1439) was an Algerian imam whose real name was Ben-Amar El Houari. He is the patron saint of the city of Oran in Algeria. The old quarter of Sidi El Houari in Oran is named after him.

== Biography ==
Sidi El Houari was born in 1350 in the village of Sour, 20 kilometres east of Mostaganem and near Ain Tedles, then under Marinid rule.

Out of Tlemcen, Fes, Tunis, Mecca, Jerusalem, Damascus and many other cities which he visited, he chose to settle in Oran and honour its inhabitants. He was well received by Oranians, and although he was buried far away from the city, visiting of his mausoleum, which shelters his supposed tomb, resembles an irremovable daily pilgrimage.

At the age of ten years, he had already memorized the whole Qur'an by heart and had acquired the title of Hafiz, educated in the doctrine of Sufism.

He went to Kel Mitou in the meadows of Chlef to visit a Saint and acquire his favour. Then he came to Oran seeking to study Islamic theology at the zawiya or "assembly" of Derkaouia Mahajia led by Sidi Maymun Mahaji and Ayoub, known for its traditions in the field of religious studies. He studied in Béjaïa and then Fes, where he taught before travelling to Egypt.

He went to Mecca for the Hajj (pilgrimage). Once he returned he finally settled in Oran where he opened a madrasah. Among the known adherents and companions of the imam Sidi El Houari El Maghraoui were Sidi Ibrahim Tazi and Sidi Said (marabout of Hassi El Ghella).

Sidi El Houari died on September 12, 1439. He is buried in Aghlad near Timimoun.

== Gallery ==
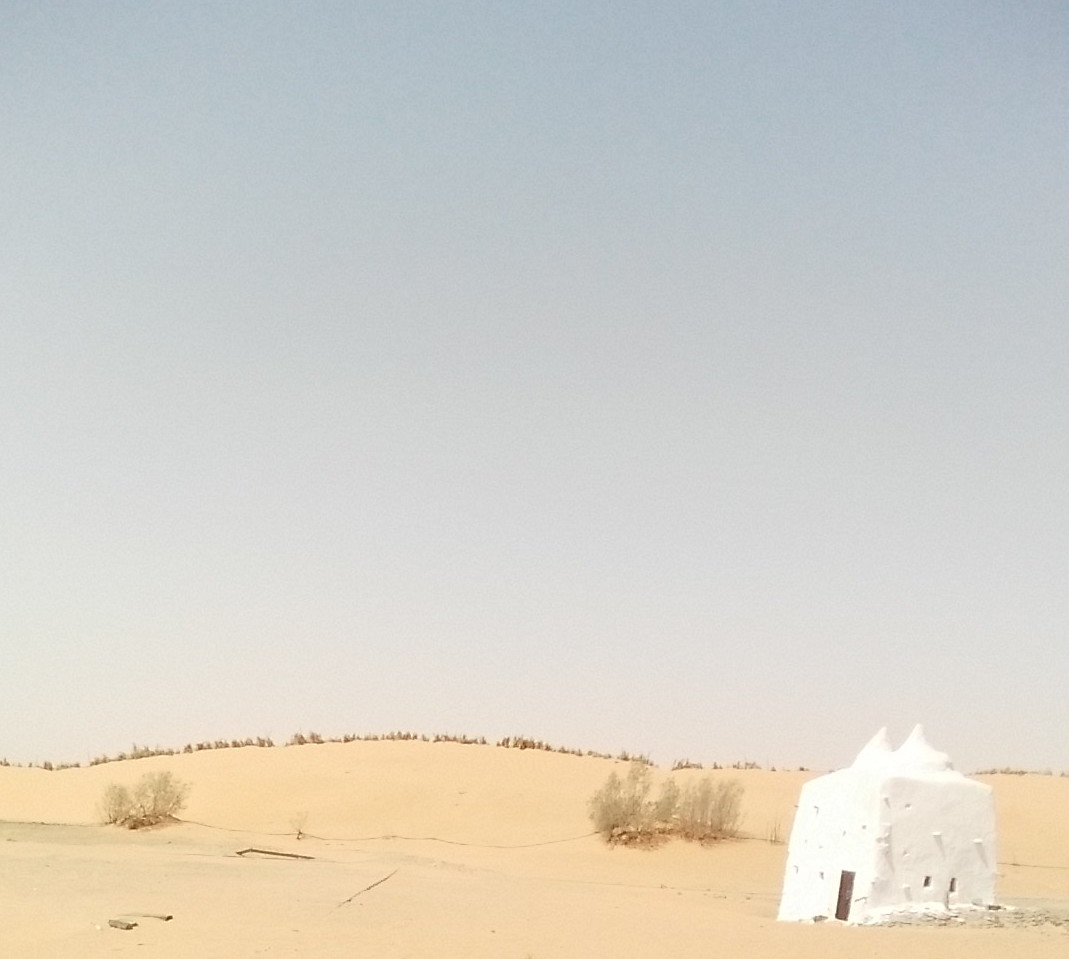
People of the Sahara believe that Sidi Houari is buried in this Tomb in the whereabouts of Timimoun
