= 2025–26 ES Mostaganem season =

ES Mostaganem
2025–26 season
- President: Taqi Al-Din Bibi
- Head coach: Nadhir Leknaoui (until 12 November 2025); Hatem Missaoui (from 15 November 2025) (until 5 February 2026); Nadhir Leknaoui (from 18 February 2026)
- Stadium: Mohamed Bensaïd Stadium; Larbi Belhamiti Stadium
- Ligue 1: 15th (relegated)
- Algerian Cup: Round of 16
- Top goalscorer: League: Zoubir Motrani (5 goals); All: Zoubir Motrani (6 goals)
- Biggest win: ES Mostaganem 2–0 CS Constantine
- Biggest defeat: CR Belouizdad 7–0 ES Mostaganem
Home colours	Away colours	Third colours

The 2025–26 season, was ES Mostaganem's 10th season and the club's 2nd consecutive season in the top flight of Algerian football. In addition to the domestic league, ES Mostaganem are participated in this season's editions of the Algerian Cup. The Algerian Professional Football League (LFP) officially released the calendar for the 2025–26 Ligue 1 Mobilis season on July 10, 2025.

== Squad list ==
Players and squad numbers last updated on 31 January 2026.
Note: Flags indicate national team as has been defined under FIFA eligibility rules. Players may hold more than one non-FIFA nationality.

No.	Nat.	Name	Position	Date of birth (age)	Signed from
Goalkeepers
1	(Algeria)	Abdesslam Hannane	GK	23 September 1995 (aged 29)	(Algeria) ASM Oran
40	(Algeria)	Mounir Aziria	GK	8 June 2006 (aged 19)	(Algeria) Reserve team
Defenders
2	(Algeria)	Aymene Boualleg	CB	8 May 2001 (aged 24)	(Algeria) USM El Harrach
3	(Algeria)	Boualem Mesmoudi	CB	15 April 1994 (aged 31)	(Algeria) ES Ben Aknoun
4	(Algeria)	Benali Benamar	CB	12 January 1995 (aged 30)	(Algeria) JS Saoura
12	(Algeria)	Mohamed Ezzemani	LB	27 November 1994 (aged 30)	(Algeria) USM Khenchela
27	(Algeria)	Abdeldjalil Bahoussi	CB	5 August 1993 (aged 32)	(Algeria) Olympique Akbou
33	(Algeria)	Abdelillah Slimane	RB	28 March 2006 (aged 19)	(Algeria) Reserve team
Midfielders
6	(Algeria)	Abdelhafid Benamara	DM	October 1, 1995 (aged 29)	(Algeria) MC Oran
8	(Algeria)	Taher Benkhelifa	DM	10 June 1994 (aged 31)	(Algeria) ES Sétif
10	(Algeria)	Abdellah El Moudene	CM	11 February 1994 (aged 31)	(Algeria) MC El Bayadh
13	(Algeria)	Sid Ali Lamri	CM	3 February 1991 (aged 34)	(Algeria) Olympique Akbou
14	(Algeria)	Mohamed Bengrina	AM	24 March 1996 (aged 29)	(Algeria) ES Ben Aknoun
21	(Algeria)	Ahmed Gagaâ	DM	15 January 1994 (aged 31)	(Libya) Al Sadaqa SC
24	(Algeria)	El Kacem Khodja	AM	8 February 2005 (aged 20)	(Algeria) MC Oran
28	(Algeria)	Abdelkrim Namani	CM	13 May 2003 (aged 22)	(Algeria) Paradou AC
Forwards
7	(Algeria)	Zoubir Motrani	ST	24 July 1995 (aged 30)	(Algeria) MC Oran
9	(Algeria)	Ali Haroun	ST	1 February 1997 (aged 28)	(Algeria) Olympique Akbou
11	(Algeria)	Abderraouf Othmani	LW	14 June 2001 (aged 24)	(Algeria) MB Rouissat
19	(Algeria)	Akram Bibi	RW	11 April 2003 (aged 22)	(Algeria) Reserve team
20	(Algeria)	Mohamed Toumi Sief	ST	7 September 1994 (aged 30)	(Algeria) MC El Bayadh
22	(Algeria)	Ameur Bouguettaya	LW	21 July 1995 (aged 30)	(Algeria) MC Oran
26	(Algeria)	Boualem Sryer	RW	8 June 2001 (aged 24)	(United Arab Emirates) Al Dhaid SC
29	(Algeria)	Ilyes Hamdi	ST	6 July 2005 (aged 20)	(Algeria) MC Oran
31	(Algeria)	Hamza Laireche	RW	5 September 2006 (aged 18)	(Algeria) Reserve team

== Transfers ==
=== In ===
==== Summer ====
Date	Pos	Player	Moving from	Fee	Source
22 July 2025	DM	(Algeria) Abdelhafid Benamara	MC Oran	Free transfer	
22 July 2025	LW	(Algeria) Zoubir Motrani	MC Oran	Free transfer	
23 July 2025	DM	(Algeria) Taher Benkhelifa	ES Sétif	Free transfer	
24 July 2025	CM	(Algeria) Sid Ali Lamri	Olympique Akbou	Free transfer	
24 July 2025	RW	(Algeria) Boualem Sryer	(United Arab Emirates) Al Dhaid SC	Free transfer	
25 July 2025	ST	(Algeria) Mohamed Toumi Sief	MC El Bayadh	Free transfer	
25 July 2025	AM	(Algeria) Houssam Eddine Bayoud	RC Arbaâ	Free transfer	
27 July 2025	CM	(Algeria) Adem Aichouche	NC Magra	Free transfer	
28 July 2025	LB	(Algeria) Chouaib Boulkaboul	Paradou AC	Free transfer	
28 July 2025	DM	(Algeria) Ahmed Gagaâ	(Libya) Al Sadaqa SC	Free transfer	
28 July 2025	CM	(Algeria) Abdellah El Moudene	MC El Bayadh	Free transfer	
29 July 2025	ST	(Algeria) Karim Bouhmidi	ES Sétif	Free transfer	
2 August 2025	CB	(Algeria) Aymene Boualleg	USM El Harrach	Free transfer	
4 August 2025	ST	(Algeria) Ali Haroun	Olympique Akbou	Free transfer	
9 August 2025	LW	(Algeria) Abdelhak Askar	Olympique Akbou	Free transfer	
10 August 2025	GK	(Algeria) Raïs M'Bohli	Unattached	Free transfer	
28 August 2025	DF	(Algeria) Mehdi Zeffane	Unattached	Free transfer	

==== Winter ====
Date	Pos	Player	Moving from	Fee	Source
22 January 2026	CB	(Algeria) Abdeldjalil Bahoussi	Unattached	Free transfer	
26 January 2026	LB	(Algeria) Mohamed Ezzemani	Unattached	Free transfer	
30 January 2026	LW	(Algeria) Abderraouf Othmani	MB Rouissat	Free transfer	
31 January 2026	CM	(Algeria) Abdelkrim Namani	Paradou AC	Free transfer	
31 January 2026	ST	(Algeria) Ilyes Hamdi	MC Oran	Free transfer	

=== Out ===
==== Summer ====
Date	Pos	Player	Moving to	Fee	Source
15 July 2025	DF	(Algeria) Chakib Aoudjane	MC Oran	Free transfer	
4 August 2025	FW	(Algeria) Ramdane Hitala	Olympique Akbou	Free transfer	
6 August 2025	LB	(Algeria) Mohamed Ezzemani	USM Khenchela	Free transfer	

==== Winter ====
Date	Pos	Player	Moving to	Fee	Source
12 December 2025	RB	(Algeria) Mehdi Zeffane	Unattached	Free transfer	
22 January 2026	LB	(Algeria) Chouaib Boulkaboul	JS Kabylie	Undisclosed	
25 January 2026	LW	(Algeria) Abdelhak Askar	USM Khenchela	Free transfer	
31 January 2026	ST	(Algeria) Adem Aichouche	USM Khenchela	Free transfer	
31 January 2026	AM	(Algeria) Houssem Bayoud	Unattached	Free transfer (Released)	
31 January 2026	GK	(Algeria) Raïs M'Bolhi	Unattached	Free transfer (Released)	
31 January 2026	CB	(Algeria) Djamel Benlamri	Unattached	Free transfer (Released)	

=== New contracts ===
No.	Pos	Player	Contract length	Contract end	Date	Source
5	CB	Djamel Benlamri	1 year	2026	24 July 2025	

== Competitions ==
=== Overview ===
Competition	Record								Started round	Final position / round	First match	Last match
Competition	G	W	D	L	GF	GA	GD	Win %	Started round	Final position / round	First match	Last match
Ligue 1	30	4	7	19	18	52	−34	13.33	—N/a	15th	22 August 2025	5 June 2026
Algerian Cup	3	2	0	1	3	3	+0	66.67	Round of 64	Round of 16	5 December 2025	15 January 2026
Total	33	6	7	20	21	55	−34	18.18				

Updated to match played 5 June 2026
Source: Competitions

=== Ligue 1 ===
==== League table ====
Pos	Team	Pld	W	D	L	GF	GA	GD	Pts	Qualification or relegation
12	MB Rouissat	30	9	9	12	30	35	−5	36	
13	ASO Chlef	30	9	7	14	26	31	−5	34	
14	Paradou AC (R)	30	7	3	20	35	54	−19	24	Relegation to Algerian League 2
15	ES Mostaganem (R)	30	4	7	19	18	52	−34	19	Relegation to Algerian League 2
16	MC El Bayadh (R)	30	2	11	17	17	40	−23	17	Relegation to Algerian League 2

Source: lfp.dz
Rules for classification: 1) Points; 2) Head-to-head points; 3) Head-to-head goal difference; 4) First half goal difference; 5) First half total goals; 6) Fairplay ranking; 7) Playoff.
(R) Relegated

==== Results summary ====
Overall								Home						Away					
Pld	W	D	L	GF	GA	GD	Pts	W	D	L	GF	GA	GD	W	D	L	GF	GA	GD
30	4	7	19	18	52	−34	19	4	5	6	14	25	−11	0	2	13	4	27	−23

Last updated: 5 June 2026.
Source: Competitive matches

==== Results by round ====
Round	1	2	3	4	5	6	7	8	9	10	11	12	13	14	15	16	17	18	19	20	21	22	23	24	25	26	27	28	29	30
Ground	A	H	A	H	A	H	A	H	A	H	A	H	A	H	A	H	A	H	A	H	A	H	A	H	A	H	A	H	A	H
Result	L	W	D	D	L	W	L	L	L	L	L	D	L	L	L	W	L	D	L	D	L	L	L	W	L	L	D	L	L	D
Position	15	6	7	10	11	9	11	13	13	14	15	15	15	15	15	15	15	15	15	15	15	15	16	15	15	15	15	15	15	15

Updated to match(es) played on 5 June 2026. Source: Competitive matches
A = Away; H = Home; W = Win; D = Draw; L = Loss

==== Matches ====
The league fixtures were announced on 31 July 2025.

All times are local, WAT (UTC+1).

Win Draw Loss Postponed

22 August 2025 Round 1	Olympique Akbou	1–0	ES Mostaganem	Béjaïa
17:00	Addadi 90+13' (pen.)	Soccerway; LFP		Stadium: Maghrebi Unity Stadium; Referee: Youcef Gamouh; VAR: Haitham Ghouti

30 August 2025 Round 2	ES Mostaganem	2–0	CS Constantine	Mostaganem
19:00	Benkhelifa 22'; Askar 70'	Soccerway; LFP		Stadium: Mohamed Bensaïd Stadium; Referee: Anes Azrine

5 September 2025 Round 3	MC Oran	0–0	ES Mostaganem	Bir El Djir
19:00		Soccerway; LFP		Stadium: Miloud Hadefi Stadium; Referee: Akram Mechairia; VAR: Rafik Aouina

11 September 2025 Round 4	ES Mostaganem	1–1	MB Rouissat	Mostaganem
19:00	Benkhelifa 8'	Soccerway; LFP	Mesmoudi 44' (o.g.)	Stadium: Mohamed Bensaïd Stadium; Referee: Abderahmane Sahraoui; VAR: Redouane Allou

24 September 2025 Round 5	JS Kabylie	1–0	ES Mostaganem	Tizi Ouzou
19:00	Mahious 20'	Soccerway; LFP		Stadium: Hocine Aït Ahmed Stadium; Referee: Houssam Benyahia; VAR: Yahia Dehar

29 September 2025 Round 6	ES Mostaganem	1–0	ES Sétif	Mostaganem
18:00	Toumi 17'	Soccerway; LFP		Stadium: Mohamed Bensaïd Stadium; Referee: Smail Hamlat; VAR: Alaa Bouab

4 October 2025 Round 7	MC Alger	1–0	ES Mostaganem	Douéra
18:00	Naidji 51'	Soccerway; LFP		Stadium: Ali La Pointe Stadium; Referee: Tahar Boudjemaa; VAR: Lahlou Benbraham

17 October 2025 Round 8	ES Mostaganem	0–1	ASO Chlef	Mostaganem
18:00		Soccerway; LFP	Bekkouche 65'	Stadium: Mohamed Bensaïd Stadium; Referee: Fateh Harkat

26 October 2025 Round 9	Paradou AC	1–0	ES Mostaganem	Belouizdad
15:00	Abdelkader 75'	Soccerway; LFP		Stadium: 20 August 1955 Stadium; Referee: Abdelali Ibrir

2 November 2025 Round 10	ES Mostaganem	0–2	CR Belouizdad	Mostaganem
17:00		Soccerway; LFP	Laouafi 23'; Benguit 84'	Stadium: Mohamed Bensaïd Stadium; Referee: Haithem Ghouti

8 November 2025 Round 11	USM Khenchela	1–0	ES Mostaganem	Khenchela
14:30	Etouga 15'	Soccerway; LFP		Stadium: Amar Hamam Stadium; Referee: Lotfi Bekouassa

17 November 2025 Round 12	ES Mostaganem	2–2	USM Alger	Chlef
16:00	Haroun 30'; El Moudene 48'	Soccerway; LFP	Khaldi 9'; Ghacha 75' (pen.)	Stadium: Mohamed Boumezrag Stadium; Referee: Alaa Bouab

20 December 2025 Round 13	JS Saoura	3–2	ES Mostaganem	Béchar
15:00	Bentaleb 5'; Boualleg 31' (o.g.); Boutiche 45+1' (pen.)	Soccerway; LFP	Motrani 58'; Boulkaboul 85'	Stadium: 20 August 1955 Stadium; Referee: Haitham Ghouti

29 December 2025 Round 14	ES Mostaganem	0–1	ES Ben Aknoun	Sidi Ali
14:00		Soccerway; LFP	Djabout 87'	Stadium: Larbi Belhamiti Stadium; Referee: Nabil Boukhalfa

8 January 2026 Round 15	MC El Bayadh	1–0	ES Mostaganem	El Bayadh
14:00	Belmiloud 80' (pen.)	Soccerway; LFP		Stadium: Zakaria Medjdoub Stadium; Referee: Ayoub Belhachemi

23 January 2026 Round 16	ES Mostaganem	1–0	Olympique Akbou	Sidi Ali
15:00	Motrani 82'	Soccerway; LFP		Stadium: Larbi Belhamiti Stadium; Referee: Youcef Tayeb Bouderbal

3 February 2026 Round 17	CS Constantine	2–1	ES Mostaganem	Constantine
17:00	Benchaira 24'; Derradji 89'	Soccerway; LFP	Benamar 55'	Stadium: Chahid Hamlaoui Stadium; Referee: Anes Azrine

7 February 2026 Round 18	ES Mostaganem	0–0	MC Oran	Sidi Ali
15:00		Soccerway; LFP		Stadium: Larbi Belhamiti Stadium; Referee: Lotfi Bekouassa

14 February 2026 Round 19	MB Rouissat	1–0	ES Mostaganem	Ouargla
15:00	Bandessi 27'	Soccerway; LFP		Stadium: 18 February Stadium; Referee: Tahar Boudjemaa

21 February 2026 Round 20	ES Mostaganem	2–2	JS Kabylie	Sidi Ali
14:30	Motrani 51', 90+5'	Soccerway; LFP	Belaïd 68'; Sarr 81'	Stadium: Larbi Belhamiti Stadium; Referee: Abdelali Ibrir

28 February 2026 Round 21	ES Sétif	3–0	ES Mostaganem	Sétif
22:00	Boukerma 62' (pen.); Zerrouki 69'; Hamidi 90+4'	Soccerway; LFP		Stadium: 8 May 1945 Stadium; Referee: Haitham Ghouti

7 March 2026 Round 22	ES Mostaganem	0–5	MC Alger	Sidi Ali
15:00		Soccerway; LFP	Bangoura 47', 56', 73', 88'; Menezla 70'	Stadium: Larbi Belhamiti Stadium; Referee: Rafik Aouina

13 March 2026 Round 23	ASO Chlef	1–0	ES Mostaganem	Chlef
22:00	Farhi 81'	Soccerway; LFP		Stadium: Mohamed Boumezrag Stadium; Referee: Mustapha Ghorbal

17 March 2026 Round 24	ES Mostaganem	3–2	Paradou AC	Sidi Ali
15:00	Toumi 30'; Motrani 45'; El Moudene 90+4'	Soccerway; LFP	Bendouma 8'; Kohili 72'	Stadium: Larbi Belhamiti Stadium; Referee: Fateh Harkat

5 April 2026 Round 25	CR Belouizdad	7–0	ES Mostaganem	Baraki
17:45	Benguit 11', 33', 63'; Khacef 24'; Boussouar 36', 61'; Ahoua 79'	Soccerway; LFP		Stadium: Nelson Mandela Stadium; Referee: Mehdi Oukil

10 April 2026 Round 26	ES Mostaganem	0–3	USM Khenchela	Sidi Ali
16:00		Soccerway; LFP	Askar 22'; Matouti 39'; Boumechra 51'	Stadium: Larbi Belhamiti Stadium; Referee: Youcef Abane

7 May 2026 Round 28	ES Mostaganem	0–4	JS Saoura	Sidi Ali
16:00		Soccerway; LFP	Saadi 22'; Sikiru 27', 51'; Fettouhi 28'	Stadium: Larbi Belhamiti Stadium; Referee: Sid Ahmed Lellouchi

12 May 2026 Round 27	USM Alger	1–1	ES Mostaganem	Algiers
19:00	Benayad 10' (pen.)	Soccerway; LFP	Laireche 22'	Stadium: Stade du 5 Juillet; Referee: Haitham Ghouti

19 May 2026 Round 29	ES Ben Aknoun	3–0	ES Mostaganem	Belouizdad
16:00	Brahimi 4'; Souibaâh 32'; Zaouache 46'	Soccerway; LFP		Stadium: 20 August 1955 Stadium; Referee: Ghada Mehat

5 June 2026 Round 30	ES Mostaganem	2–2	MC El Bayadh	Sidi Ali
17:00	Namani 6'; Benzina 45+1'	Soccerway; LFP	Chelali 7'; Yaiche 73'	Stadium: Larbi Belhamiti Stadium; Referee: Abdennour Khalfallah

=== Algerian Cup ===
5 December 2025 Round of 64	MC Oran	1–2	ES Mostaganem	Bir El Djir
17:00	Kerroum 45+7' (pen.)	Report	Motrani 69'; Askar 74'	Stadium: Miloud Hadefi Stadium; Referee: Anes Azrine

13 December 2025 Round of 32	RC Arbaâ	0–1	ES Mostaganem	Blida
14:00		Report	Mesmoudi 90'	Stadium: Brakni Brothers Stadium; Referee: Zouhir Mansari

15 January 2026 Round of 16	ES Mostaganem	0–2	JS Saoura	Chlef
16:00		Report	Akacem 37'; Allaoui 30'	Stadium: Mohamed Boumezrag Stadium; Referee: Mohamed Chaoubi

== Squad information ==
=== Appearances and goals ===
As of 5 June 2026

No.	Pos	Player	Nat	Ligue 1			Algerian Cup			Total		
No.	Pos	Player	Nat	App	St	G	App	St	G	App	St	G
Goalkeepers
1	GK	Abdesslam Hannane	(Algeria)	14	14	0	2	2	0	16	16	0
30	GK	Abdelkader Fredj	(Algeria)	1	1	0	0	0	0	1	1	0
40	GK	Mounir Aziria	(Algeria)	10	9	0	1	1	0	11	10	0
Defenders
2	CB	Aymene Boualleg	(Algeria)	15	11	0	3	3	0	18	14	0
3	CB	Boualem Mesmoudi	(Algeria)	16	13	0	2	1	1	18	14	1
4	CB	Benali Benamar	(Algeria)	27	27	1	3	3	0	30	30	1
12	LB	Mohamed Ezzemani	(Algeria)	13	12	0	0	0	0	13	12	0
27	CB	Abdeldjalil Bahoussi	(Algeria)	8	8	0	0	0	0	8	8	0
33	RB	Abdelillah Slimane	(Algeria)	9	6	0	2	2	0	11	8	0
42	CB	Rayane Ramdane	(Algeria)	7	1	0	1	0	0	8	1	0
43	CB	Abdellah Benmehdi	(Algeria)	5	4	0	0	0	0	5	4	0
Midfielders
6	DM	Abdelhafid Benamara	(Algeria)	23	21	0	3	2	0	26	23	0
8	DM	Taher Benkhelifa	(Algeria)	16	14	2	3	2	0	19	16	2
10	CM	Abdellah El Moudene	(Algeria)	19	9	2	1	1	0	20	10	2
13	CM	Sid Ali Lamri	(Algeria)	20	16	0	2	1	0	22	17	0
14	AM	Mohamed Bengrina	(Algeria)	5	2	0	2	2	0	7	4	0
21	DM	Ahmed Gagaâ	(Algeria)	26	16	0	2	2	0	28	18	0
24	AM	El Kacem Khodja	(Algeria)	8	5	0	0	0	0	8	5	0
28	CM	Abdelkrim Namani	(Algeria)	11	9	1	0	0	0	11	9	1
Forwards
7	ST	Zoubir Motrani	(Algeria)	23	19	5	3	2	1	26	21	6
9	ST	Ali Haroun	(Algeria)	17	9	1	2	1	0	19	10	1
11	LW	Abderraouf Othmani	(Algeria)	11	6	0	0	0	0	11	6	0
19	RW	Akram Bibi	(Algeria)	13	11	0	3	2	0	16	13	0
20	ST	Mohamed Toumi Sief	(Algeria)	21	14	2	1	1	0	22	15	2
22	LW	Ameur Bouguettaya	(Algeria)	13	4	0	2	1	0	15	5	0
26	RW	Boualem Sryer	(Algeria)	22	13	0	2	0	0	24	13	0
29	ST	Ilyes Hamdi	(Algeria)	4	2	0	2	1	0	6	3	0
31	RW	Hamza Laireche	(Algeria)	14	6	1	1	1	0	15	7	1
45	ST	Abdelilah Benzina	(Algeria)	4	0	1	1	0	0	5	0	1
Players transferred out during the season
~~12~~	RB	Mehdi Zeffane	(Algeria)	5	4	0	0	0	0	5	4	0
~~15~~	LB	Chouaib Boulkaboul	(Algeria)	15	14	1	2	2	0	0	0	1
~~11~~	LW	Abdelhak Askar	(Algeria)	15	13	1	2	1	1	17	14	2
~~18~~	ST	Adem Aichouche	(Algeria)	3	0	0	0	0	0	3	0	0
~~17~~	AM	Houssem Bayoud	(Algeria)	5	3	0	0	0	0	5	3	0
~~23~~	GK	Raïs M'Bolhi	(Algeria)	6	0	0	0	0	0	6	0	0
~~5~~	CB	Djamel Benlamri	(Algeria)	7	6	0	0	0	0	7	6	0
Total				30		18	3		3	33		21

Last updated: 5 June 2026
Source: soccerway.com

=== Goalscorers ===
As of 5 June 2026

Includes all competitive matches.

No.	Nat.	Player	Pos.	L1	AC	TOTAL
7	(Algeria)	Zoubir Motrani	ST	5	1	6
8	(Algeria)	Taher Benkhelifa	DM	2	0	2
20	(Algeria)	Mohamed Toumi Sief	ST	2	0	2
10	(Algeria)	Abdellah El Moudene	CM	2	0	2
9	(Algeria)	Ali Haroun	ST	1	0	1
3	(Algeria)	Boualem Mesmoudi	CB	0	1	1
4	(Algeria)	Benali Benamar	CB	1	0	1
31	(Algeria)	Hamza Laireche	RW	1	0	1
28	(Algeria)	Abdelkrim Namani	CM	1	0	1
45	(Algeria)	Abdelillah Benzina	RW	1	0	1
Players transferred out during the season
~~11~~	(Algeria)	Abdelhak Askar	LW	1	1	2
~~15~~	(Algeria)	Chouaib Boulkaboul	LB	1	0	1
Own Goals				0	0	0
Totals				18	3	21

=== Clean sheets ===
As of 5 June 2026

Includes all competitive matches.

					Clean sheets		
No.	Nat	Name	GP	GA	L 1	AC	Total
1	(Algeria)	Abdesslam Hannane	16	27	3	0	3
30	(Algeria)	Abdelkader Fredj	1	2	0	0	0
40	(Algeria)	Mounir Aziria	10	22	0	1	1
Players transferred out during the season
~~23~~	(Algeria)	Raïs M'Bolhi	6	4	2	0	2
		TOTALS		55	5	1	6
