= Hadjadj (disambiguation) =

Hadjadj is a town and commune in Mila Province, Algeria.

Hadjadj may also refer to:

- El Hadjadj, a town in Chlef Province, Algeria
- Fabrice Hadjadj (born 1971), French writer and philosopher
- Fodil Hadjadj (born 1983), Algerian football player
