= Fornaka =

Fornaka فرناكة
- Commune and town
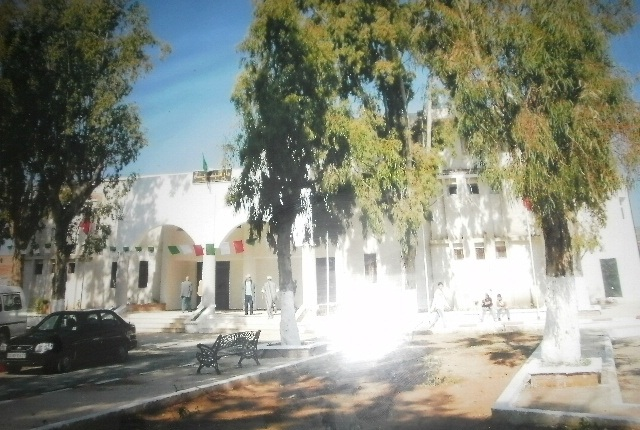

- Location within Algeria
- Coordinates: 35°45′6″N 0°0′58″W
- Country: Algeria
- Province: Mostaganem Province
- District: Aïn Nouïssy District

Population (2008)
  - Total: 17,647
- Time zone: UTC+1 (CET)

Fornaka is a location in Algeria. Fornaka is located 27 km (17miles) from Mostaganem, the wilaya (province) capital, and 60 km (37 mi) from Oran, the country's second largest city. The city is located slightly west on the Greenwich meridian. As of 1998, the commune had a total population of 14,371.

== History ==
In 1870, Fornaka became the settlement for the German-speaking refugees from Alsace and Lorraine. They were not the first who tried to start a new life in this fertile land.

At the end of the 15th century, the Christian Spain expelled millions of its non-Christian citizens. Hundreds of the Moors came to Stidia and Fornaka and implemented a new life at the image of their former life in the lost for ever Andalus.

During the two last decades, Fornaka is facing the problem of the immigration of the youth to Spain, France, Germany and North America.

== Name ==
According to Salim Ammar who was born in Fornaka and lived till the age of 33 years in Fornaka, this town was named according to the Amazigh (Berber legend) of the king Arzew and his two sons Fornak and Aghbal. The reference is the oral myths collected from the inhabitants of bethioua and published in the "Revue africaine" in 1911 by the " Societe Geographique Algerienne".

Through the description of the 300 years fighting against the Spanish military presence in the "Presidio " of Oran, the Arab Geographers named the actual Fornaka as'Fom Al Bah'r", literally the mouth of the sea.
