= Sayada =

Sayada is the name of:

- Sayada, Algeria, a town in Algeria.
- Sayada, Tunisia, a town in Tunisia.
