= Benabdelmalek Ramdane =

- Commune and town
- Location within Algeria
- Coordinates: 36°6′9″N 0°16′27″E
- Country: Algeria
- Province: Mostaganem Province
- District: Sidi Lakhdar District

Population (1998)
  - Total: 12,577
- Time zone: UTC+1 (CET)

Benabdelmalek Ramdane (also Ben Abdelmalek Ramdan) is a town and commune in Mostaganem Province, Algeria. It is located in Sidi Lakhdar District. According to the 1998 census it has a population of 12,577.
