= Sidi Ali =

- Commune and town
- Location within Algeria
- Coordinates: 36°6′17″N 0°25′24″E
- Country: Algeria
- Province: Mostaganem Province
- District: Sidi Ali District

Area
  - Total: 84 sq mi (217 km^{2})

Population (2008)
  - Total: 37,230
- Time zone: UTC+1 (CET)
- Algérie Poste: 27002

Sidi Ali, formally known as Cassaigne during the French colonization, is a town and commune in the Mostaganem Province, Algeria. It is the capital of Sidi Ali District. According to the 2008 census it has a population of 37,230.

== Toponymy ==
The city of Sidi Ali owes its name to a holy Muslim character: Sidi Ali El-Ketroussi, son-in-law of Sidi Afif El-Maghraoui, who would lived in the ^{15th} century, fleeing Andalusia and finally settling within the Berber tribe Maghraoua of the Dahra who welcomed them. Today, two mausoleums are erected in the region in their memory

== History ==
=== French colonial era ===
The city was named Cassaigne during the period of French Algeria in honor of Colonel Cassaigne. Since the independence of Algeria, the city has been named after the city's saint^{.}

==== Algerian War ====
"THE 31 OCTOBER TO SIDI ALI This Sunday, 31 October 1954, at nightfall, a group of revolutionaries under the orders of Sahraoui and Belhamiti met at the place called "Oued Abid". Sahrawi has weapons of war (3 Italian rifles, a mause rifles and ammunition) that were provided to him by Bordji Amar. The purpose of this meeting is to organize an attack that must be triggered at one time in the morning. All of them met in the centre of Cassaigne (Sidi Ali); and Belhamiti headed for half a group consisting of Mehantal, Belkuniene, Chouarfia, who were to position themselves slightly to the south and east of the gendarmerie buildings. The other half-group under the leadership of Sahraoui Abdelkader and consisting of Belkonyne Taieb, Tehar Ahmed and Beldjilali Youssef was approaching the outer court of the gendarmerie from the West. It was at this point that a car stopped in front of the outer court, on the east side of the gendarmerie, came. Belhamiti's half-support group hid in a ditch along the road. Belkonyne and Tehar, for fear of being surprised too, sought to hide behind the gendarmerie buildings; they found Saharaoui Abdelkader, who ordered them to stand ahead and to shoot the arrivals. Laurent François, driver of the vehicle, and Mendez Jean-François, his travelling companion, were returning from a ball from Mostaganem and returning to Picard; on their way they were arrested by Mr. Mira - manager of the Monsonégo farm - who asked them to alert the gendarmerie because he was attacked. Shots then slammed but did not reach them. Laurent François and Mendez Jean-François therefore rushed to Cassaigne and came to alert the gendarmerie. Laurent François was ringing at the entrance gate and both were waiting for them to be opened; they were illuminated by the light bulb lit above the gate which made them an excellent target for the snipers. Belkonyène and Tehar, in the position of shooters immediately behind the gendarmerie wire fence, about twenty meters from Laurent François and Mendez Jean-François, each fired a shot. Laurent François collapsed, mortally shot in the back of the neck; Mendez Jean-François sank but was not hit by the bullet that would crash near a murderer in the gendarmerie wall. A third shot was fired without reaching its target. The revolutionaries fled and retreated to the place called "The Stone". Verdict of the Mostaganem Assize Court of 24 July 1955: Sentenced: Belkonyène Taieb, Tahar Ahmed and Saharoui Albdelkader. Forced labour for life: Belhamiti. Twenty years of hard labour: Shuarfia, Belkonie Mohamed.

=== After Independence ===
During the Algerian Civil War, the city of Sidi Ali was hit twice on 1 and 3 November 1994 respectively. On 1^{st} November, a bomb exploded at the Sidi Ali cemetery, where a ceremony was held on the occasion of the outbreak of the war of national liberation, 5 children were killed and 17 were injured, two days later 36 people were arrested and then executed or burned by military security.

== Demographic ==
Sidi Ali is the third most populous municipality in the Mostaganem region after Mostaganem (City) and Ain Tedles, according to the general population and housing census of 2008, the population of Sidi Ali commune is estimated at 37,230 inhabitants, compared to 7,198 in 1977.

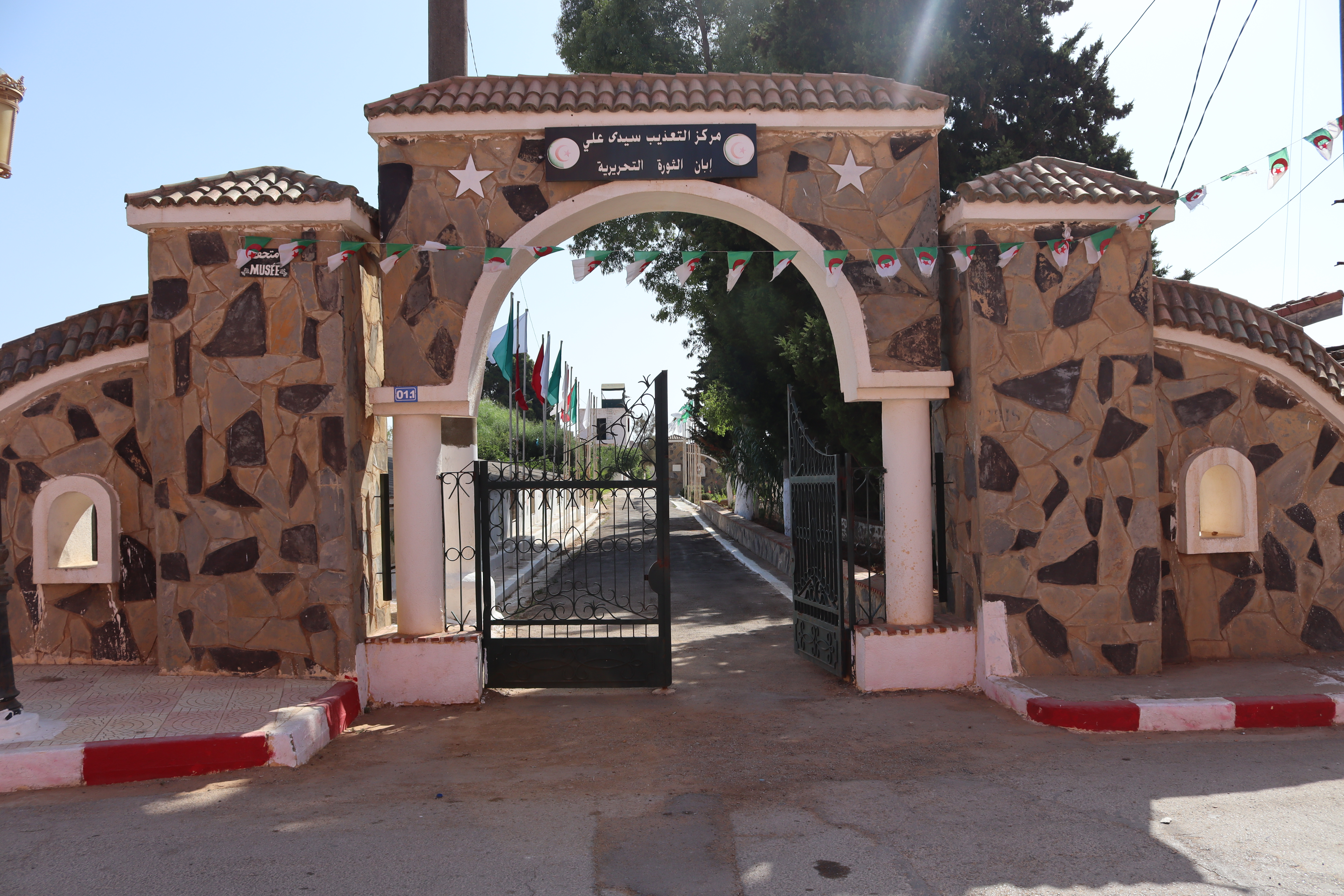
Former torture center of Sidi Ali (Mostaganem)
