= Touahria =

Coordinates: 35°48′38″N 0°12′34″E

- Commune and town
- Country: Algeria
- Province: Mostaganem Province
- District: Mesra District

Population (1998)
  - Total: 6,674
- Time zone: UTC+1 (CET)

Touahria is a town and commune in Mostaganem Province, Algeria. It is located in Mesra District. According to the 1998 census it has a population of 6,674.
