= Aïn Sidi Chérif =

Coordinates: 35°49′59″N 0°07′31″E

- Commune and town
- Interactive map of Aïn Sidi Chérif
- Country: Algeria
- Province: Mostaganem Province
- District: Mesra District

Population (1998)
  - Total: 7,819
- Time zone: UTC+1 (CET)

Aïn Sidi Chérif is a town and commune in Mostaganem Province, Algeria. It is located in Mesra District. According to the 1998 census it has a population of 7,819.
