= Achacha District =

Coordinates: 36.2463°N 0.6343°E

Achacha District دائرة عشعاشة
- District
- Location of Achacha District within Mostaganem Province
- Country: Algeria
- Province: Mostaganem
- District seat: Achacha

Population (1998)
  - Total: 63,644
- Time zone: UTC+01 (CET)
- Municipalities: 4

Achacha is a district situated within Mostaganem Province, lying on the Mediterranean Sea, northern Algeria. The district was named after its capital, Achacha.

== Municipalities ==
The district is further divided into four municipalities, these include the following:

- Achacha (population: 31,360)
- Khadra (population: 12,294
- Nekmaria (population: 9,104)
- Ouled Boughalem (population: 11,886)
