= Bouguirat District =

Coordinates: 35.7515°N 0.2532°E

Bouguirat District دائرة بوقيراط
- District
- Map of Algeria highlighting Mostaganem Province

- Map of Mostaganem Province highlighting Bouguirat District
- Country: Algeria
- Province: Mostaganem
- District seat: Bouguirat

Population (1998)
  - Total: 71,781
- Time zone: UTC+01 (CET)
- Municipalities: 4

Bouguirat is a district in Mostaganem Province, Algeria. It was named after its capital, Bouguirat.

== Municipalities ==
The district is further divided into 4 municipalities:

- Bouguirat
- Safsaf
- Souaflia
- Sirat
