= Bouguirat =

- Commune and town
- Location within Algeria
- Coordinates: 35°45′3″N 0°15′20″E
- Country: Algeria
- Province: Mostaganem Province
- District: Bouguirat District

Population (1998)
  - Total: 26,954
- Time zone: UTC+1 (CET)

Bouguirat is a town and commune in Mostaganem Province, Algeria. It is the capital of Bouguirat District. According to the 1998 census it has a population of 26,954. It contains the municipal stadium.
