= Ouled Malah =

Coordinates: 36°00′25″N 0°35′31″E

- Commune and town
- Interactive map of Ouled Malah
- Country: Algeria
- Province: Mostaganem Province
- District: Sidi Ali District

Population (1998)
  - Total: 8,948
- Time zone: UTC+1 (CET)

Ouled Malah is a town and commune in Mostaganem Province, Algeria. It is located in Sidi Ali District. According to the 1998 census it has a population of 8,948.
