= Kheïr Eddine =

- Commune and town
- Location within Algeria
- Coordinates: 35°58′50″N 0°10′5″E
- Country: Algeria
- Province: Mostaganem Province
- District: Kheïr Eddine District

Population (1998)
  - Total: 22,241
- Time zone: UTC+1 (CET)

Kheïr Eddine (also Hayreddin) is a town and commune in Mostaganem Province, Algeria. It is the capital of Kheïr Eddine District. According to the 1998 census it has a population of 22,241.
