= Aïn Tedles District =

Coordinates: 35.9947°N 0.2956°E

Aïn Tédelès District دائرة عين تدلس
- District
- Map of Algeria highlighting Mostaganem Province

- Map of Mostaganem Province highlighting Aïn Tédelès District
- Country: Algeria
- Province: Mostaganem
- District seat: Aïn Tédelès

Population (1998)
  - Total: 73,680
- Time zone: UTC+01 (CET)
- Municipalities: 4

Aïn Tédelès is a district in Mostaganem Province, Algeria. It was named after its capital, Aïn Tédelès.

== Municipalities ==
The district is further divided into 4 municipalities:

- Aïn Tedles
- Sour
- Sidi Bellater
- Oued El Kheïr
