= Aïn Nouïssy District =

Coordinates: 35.8000°N 0.0500°E

Aïn Nouïssy District دائرة النويصي
- District
- Map of Algeria highlighting Mostaganem Province
- Country: Algeria
- Province: Mostaganem
- District seat: Aïn Nouïssy

Population (1998)
  - Total: 34,595
- Time zone: UTC+01 (CET)
- Municipalities: 3

Aïn Nouïssy is a district in Mostaganem Province, Algeria. It was named after its capital, Aïn Nouïssy.

== Municipalities ==
The district is further divided into 3 municipalities:

- Aïn Nouïssy
- Fornaka
- El Hassaine-Béni Yahi
