= Sirat, Algeria =

Sirat سيرات
- Commune and town
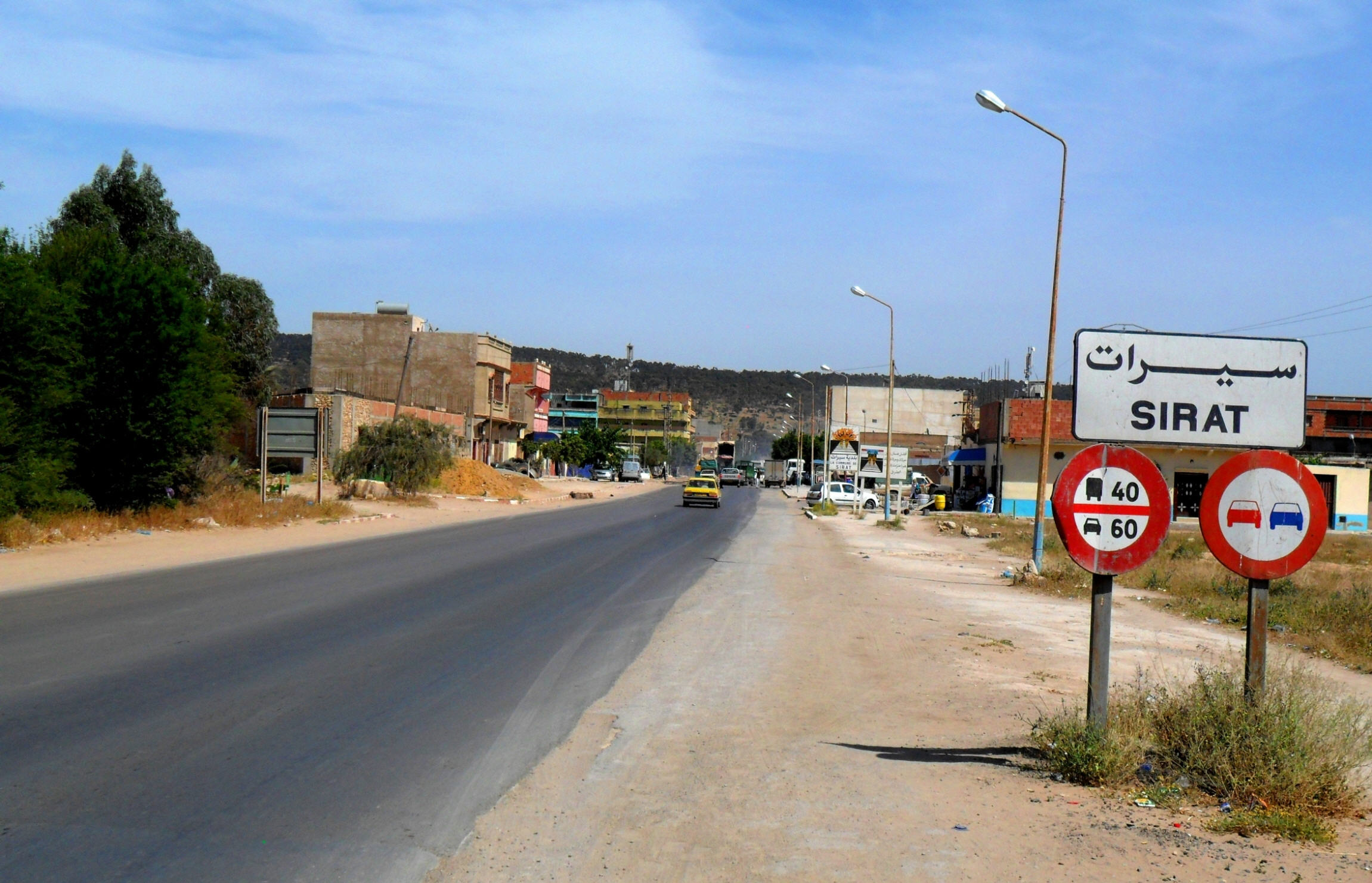

- Location within Algeria
- Coordinates: 35°46′48″N 0°11′31″E
- Country: Algeria
- Province: Mostaganem Province
- District: Bouguirat District

Area
  - Total: 27 sq mi (71 km^{2})

Population (2008)
  - Total: 21,677
- Time zone: UTC+1 (CET)

Sirat is a town and commune in Mostaganem Province, Algeria. It is located in Bouguirat District. According to the 1998 census it has a population of 17,979. It lies on the N23 road.
