= Mansourah, Mostaganem =

Coordinates: 35°50′37″N 0°13′54″E

Mansourah
- Commune and town
- Interactive map of Mansourah
- Country: Algeria
- Province: Mostaganem Province
- District: Mesra District

Population (1998)
  - Total: 15,641
- Time zone: UTC+1 (CET)

Mansourah is a town and commune in Mostaganem Province, Algeria. It is located in Mesra District. According to the 1998 census it has a population of 15,641.
