= El Hassaine =

El Hassaine الحسيان El Hassaine-Béni Yahi
- Commune and town

- Location within Algeria
- Coordinates: 35.7667°N 0.0333333°W
- Country: Algeria
- Province: Mostaganem Province
- District: Aïn Nouïssy District

Area
  - Total: 27 sq mi (70 km^{2})

Population (2008)
  - Total: 9,680
- Time zone: UTC+1 (CET)

El Hassaine-Béni Yahi is a town and commune in Mostaganem Province, Algeria. It is located in Aïn Nouïssy District.
