= Sidi Lakhdar District =

Coordinates: 36.3000°N 2.2000°E

Sidi Lakhdar District دائرة سيدي الأخضر
- District
- Map of Algeria highlighting Mostaganem Province
- Country: Algeria
- Province: Mostaganem
- District seat: Sidi Lakhdar

Population (1998)
  - Total: 59,362
- Time zone: UTC+01 (CET)
- Municipalities: 3

Sidi Lakhdar is a district in Mostaganem Province, Algeria. It was named after its capital, Sidi Lakhdar.

== Municipalities ==
The district is further divided into 3 municipalities:

- Sidi Lakhdar
- Hadjadj
- Benabdelmalek Ramdane
