= Tazgait =

- Commune and town
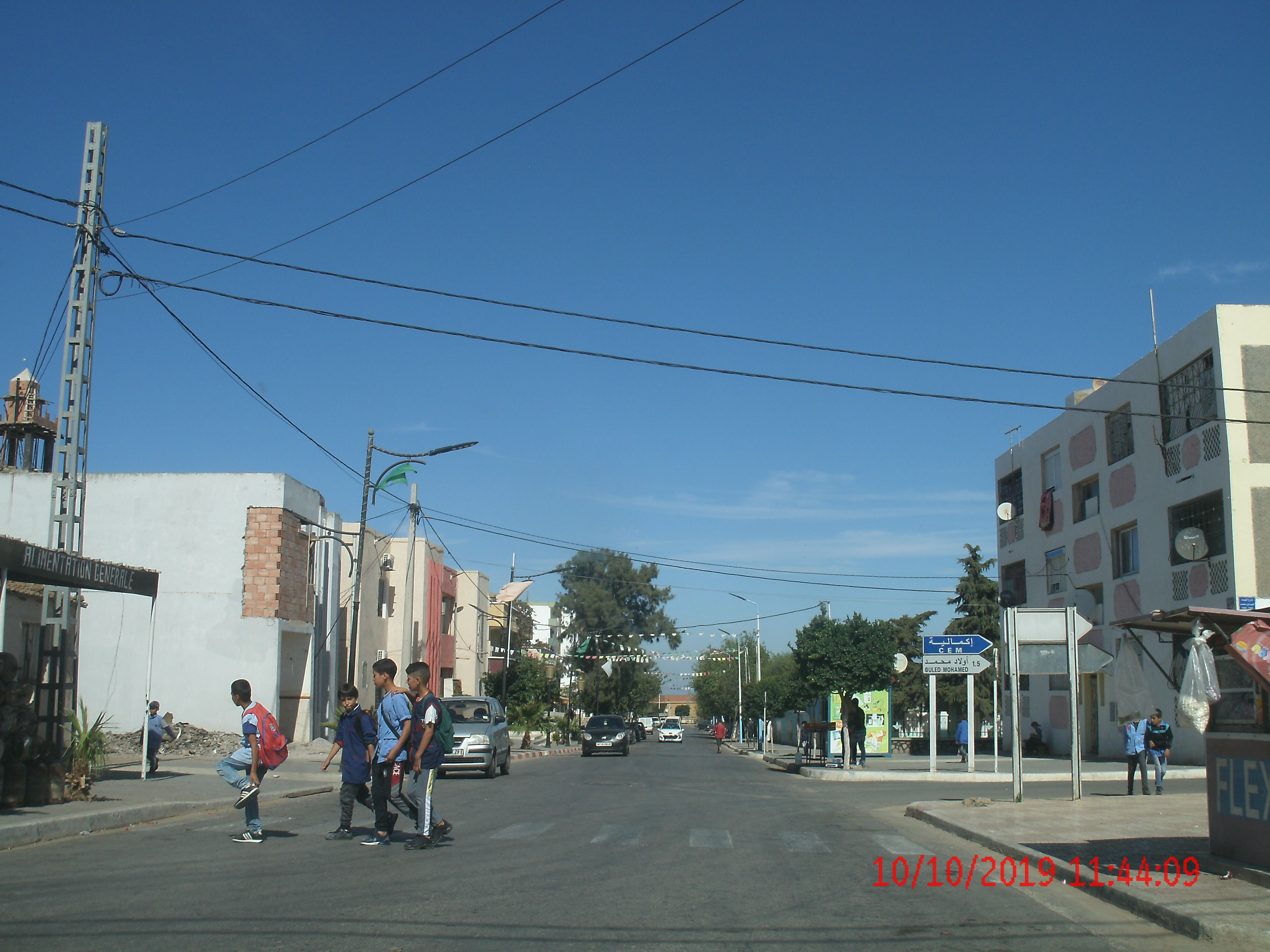

- Location within Algeria
- Country: Algeria
- Province: Mostaganem Province
- District: Sidi Ali District

Population (1998)
  - Total: 8,763
- Time zone: UTC+1 (CET)

Tazgait is a town and commune in Mostaganem Province, Algeria. It is located in Sidi Ali District. According to the 1998 census it has a population of 8,763.
