= Hassi Mamèche District =

Coordinates: 35.8611°N 0.7250°E

Hassi Mamèche District دائرة حاسي ماماش
- District
- Map of Algeria highlighting Mostaganem Province
- Country: Algeria
- Province: Mostaganem
- District seat: Hassi Mamèche

Population (1998)
  - Total: 47,586
- Time zone: UTC+01 (CET)
- Municipalities: 3

Hassi Mamèche is a district in Mostaganem Province, Algeria. It was named after its capital, Hassi Mamèche.

== Municipalities ==
The district is further divided into 3 municipalities:

- Hassi Mamèche
- Stidia
- Mazagran
