= Hassi Mamèche =

- Commune and town
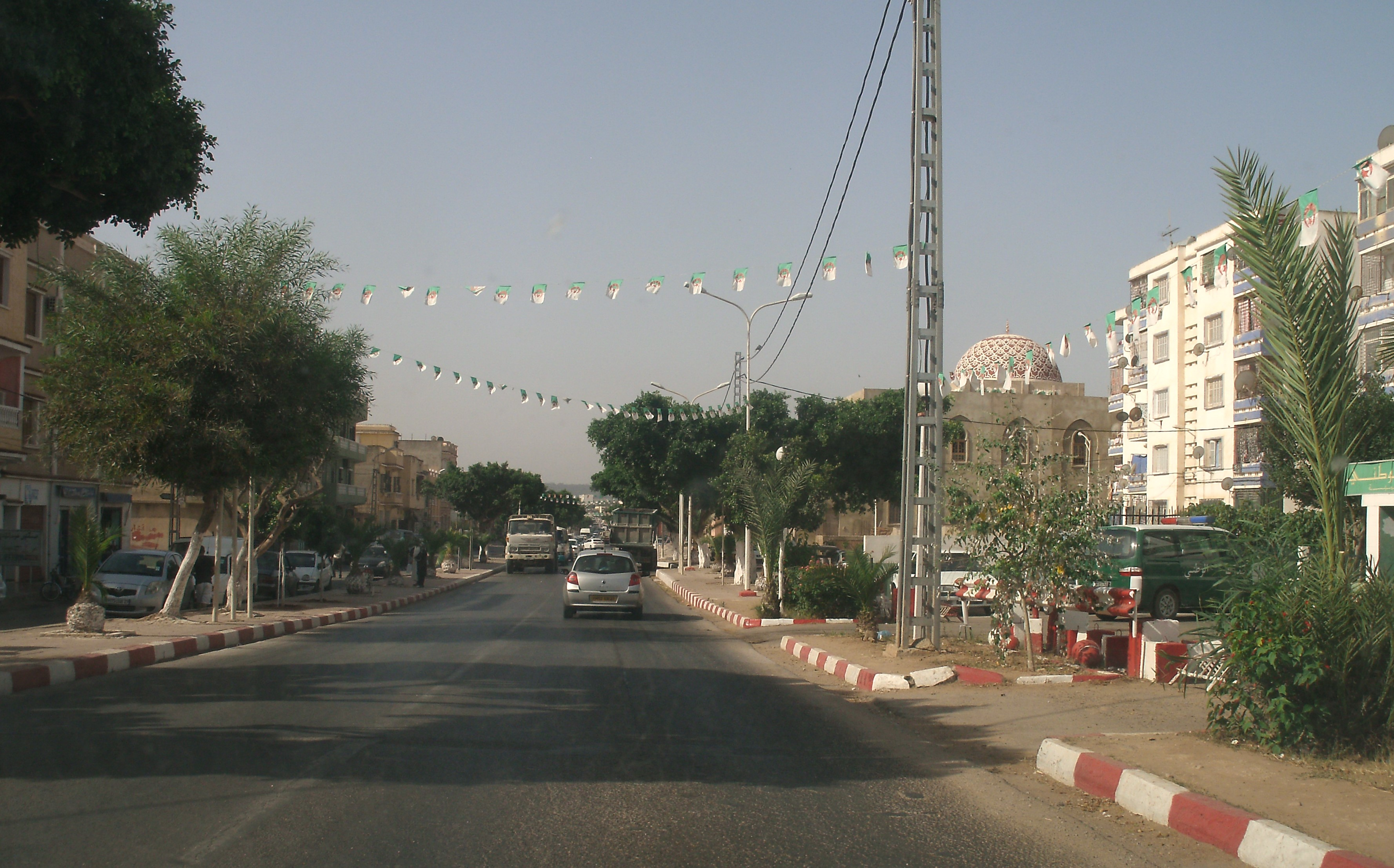

- Location within Algeria
- Coordinates: 35°51′40″N 0°43′30″E
- Country: Algeria
- Province: Mostaganem Province
- District: Hassi Mamèche District

Population (1998)
  - Total: 21,778
- Time zone: UTC+1 (CET)

Hassi Mamèche is a town and commune in Mostaganem Province, Algeria. It is the capital of Hassi Mamèche District. According to the 1998 census it has a population of 21,778.
