= Aïn Nouïssy =

Aïn Nouïssy عين النويصي
- Commune and town
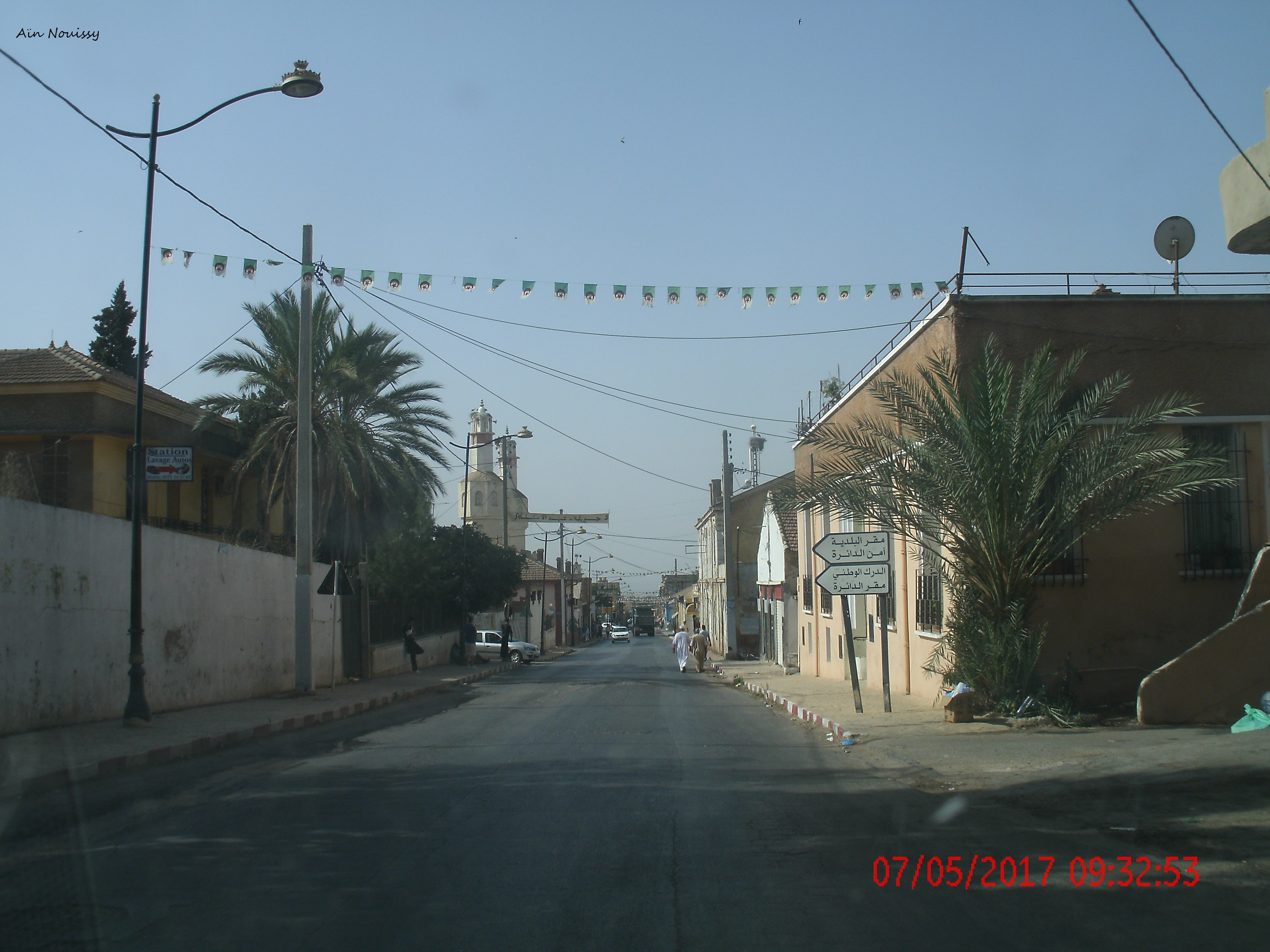

- Location within Algeria
- Coordinates: 35.8°N 0.05°E
- Country: Algeria
- Province: Mostaganem Province
- District: Aïn Nouïssy District

Area
  - Total: 20 sq mi (53 km^{2})

Population (2008)
  - Total: 14,530
- Time zone: UTC+1 (CET)

Aïn Nouïssy is a town and commune in Mostaganem Province, Algeria. It is the capital of Aïn Nouïssy District. According to the 1998 census it has a population of 11,389.
