= Sidi Ali District =

Coordinates: 36.1047°N 0.4233°E

Sidi Ali District دائرة سيدي علي
- District
- Map of Algeria highlighting Mostaganem Province

- Map of Mostaganem Province highlighting Sidi Ali District
- Country: Algeria
- Province: Mostaganem
- District seat: Sidi Ali

Population (1998)
  - Total: 49,551
- Time zone: UTC+01 (CET)
- Municipalities: 3

Sidi Ali is a district in Mostaganem Province, Algeria. It was named after its capital, Sidi Ali.

== Municipalities ==
The district is further divided into 4 municipalities:

- Sidi Ali
- Tazgait
- Ouled Malah
