= Kheïr Eddine District =

Coordinates: 35.9812°N 0.1688°E

Kheïr Eddine District دائرة خير الدين
- District
- Map of Algeria highlighting Mostaganem Province
- Country: Algeria
- Province: Mostaganem
- District seat: Kheïr Eddine

Population (1998)
  - Total: 49,382
- Time zone: UTC+01 (CET)
- Municipalities: 3

Kheïr Eddine is a district in Mostaganem Province, Algeria. It was named after its capital, Kheïr Eddine.

== Municipalities ==
The district is further divided into 3 municipalities:

- Kheïr Eddine
- Aïn Boudinar
- Sayada
