= Mesra =

Coordinates: 35°50′N 0°10′E

- Commune and town
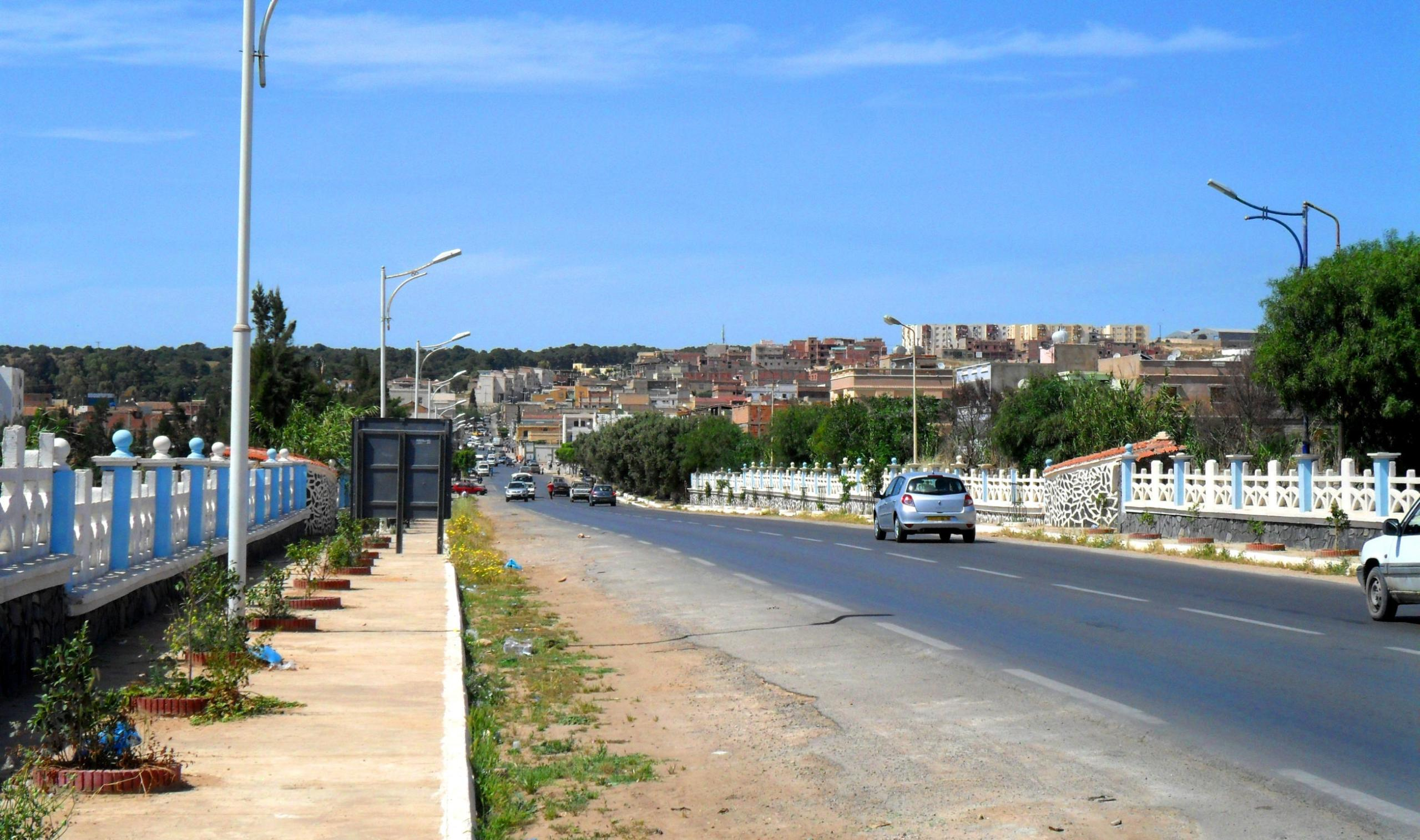
- Interactive map of Mesra
- Country: Algeria
- Province: Mostaganem Province
- District: Mesra District

Population (1998)
  - Total: 20,053
- Time zone: UTC+1 (CET)

Mesra is a town and commune in Mostaganem Province, Algeria. It is the capital of Mesra District. According to the 1998 census it has a population of 20,053.
