= Oued El Kheïr =

Oued El Kheïr واد الخير
- Commune and town
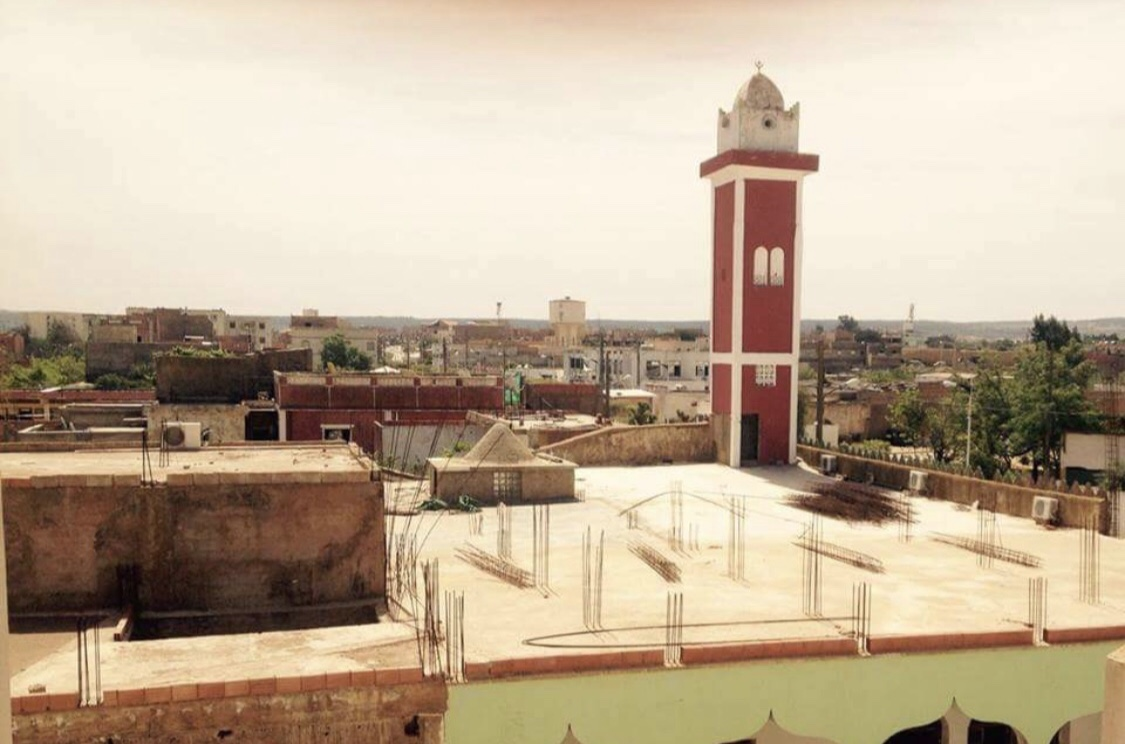

- Location within Algeria
- Coordinates: 35°57′1″N 0°22′51″E
- Country: Algeria
- Province: Mostaganem Province
- District: Aïn Tédelès District

Area
  - Total: 27 sq mi (70 km^{2})

Population (2008)
  - Total: 17,359
- Time zone: UTC+1 (CET)

Oued El Kheïr is a town and commune in Mostaganem Province, Algeria. It is located in Aïn Tédelès District. According to the 1998 census it has a population of 14,700.
