= Safsaf, Algeria =

Safsaf
- Commune and town
- Location within Algeria
- Coordinates: 36°4′31″N 0°25′42″E
- Country: Algeria
- Province: Mostaganem Province
- District: Bouguirat District

Population (1998)
  - Total: 12,492
- Time zone: UTC+1 (CET)

Safsaf is a town and commune in Mostaganem Province, Algeria. It is located in Bouguirat District. According to the 1998 census, it had a population of 12,492.
