= Souaflia =

- Commune and town

- Location within Algeria
- Coordinates: 35.85°N 0.333333°E
- Country: Algeria
- Province: Mostaganem Province
- District: Bouguirat District

Area
  - Total: 30 sq mi (78 km^{2})

Population (2008)
  - Total: 17,223
- Time zone: UTC+1 (CET)

Souaflia is a town and commune in Mostaganem Province, Algeria. It is located in Bouguirat District. According to the 1998 census it has a population of 14,356.
