= Mesra District =

Coordinates: 35.8373°N 0.1698°E

Mesra District دائرة ماسرة
- District
- Map of Algeria highlighting Mostaganem Province
- Country: Algeria
- Province: Mostaganem
- District seat: Mesra

Population (1998)
  - Total: 50,187
- Time zone: UTC+01 (CET)
- Municipalities: 4

Mesra is a district in Mostaganem Province, Algeria. It was named after its capital, Mesra.

== Municipalities ==
The district is further divided into 4 municipalities:

- Mesra
- Aïn Sidi Chérif
- Touahria
- Mansourah
