= Aïn Boudinar =

- Commune and town

- Aïn Boudinar within Algeria
- Coordinates: 36°1′0″N 0°11′0″E
- Country: Algeria
- Province: Mostaganem Province
- District: Kheïr Eddine District

Population (1998)
  - Total: 5,241
- Time zone: UTC+1 (CET)

Aïn Boudinar is a town and commune in Mostaganem Province, Algeria. It is located in Kheïr Eddine District. According to the 1998 census it has a population of 5,241.
