= Sidi Bellater =

- Commune and town
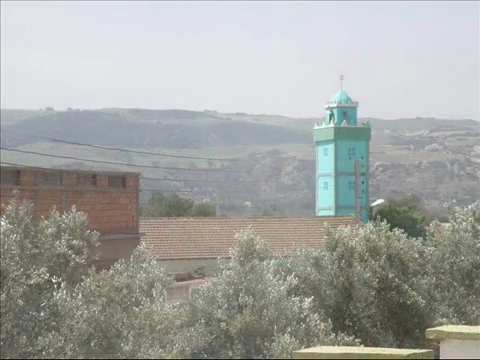

- Location within Algeria
- Coordinates: 36.026698°N 0.26931°E
- Country: Algeria
- Province: Mostaganem Province
- District: Aïn Tédelès District

Area
  - Total: 34 sq mi (88 km^{2})

Population (2008)
  - Total: 6,794
- Time zone: UTC+1 (CET)
- CP: 27015

Sidi Bellater or Sidi Belattar is a town and commune in Mostaganem Province, Algeria. It is located in Aïn Tédelès District. According to the 1998 census it has a population of 6,670.

== History ==
The town was a colony of the Roman empire, called Quiza Xenitana.
