= Nékmaria =

Nekmaria نقمارية
- Commune and town

- Location within Algeria
- Coordinates: 36.1667°N 0.616667°E
- Country: Algeria
- Province: Mostaganem Province
- District: Achacha District

Area
  - Total: 18 sq mi (47 km^{2})

Population (2008)
  - Total: 10,446
- Time zone: UTC+1 (CET)

Nékmaria is a town and commune in Mostaganem Province, Algeria. It is located in Achacha District. According to the 1998 census it has a population of 9,104.
