= Sidi Lakhdar, Mostaganem =

Sidi Lakhdar سيدي لخضر
- Commune and town
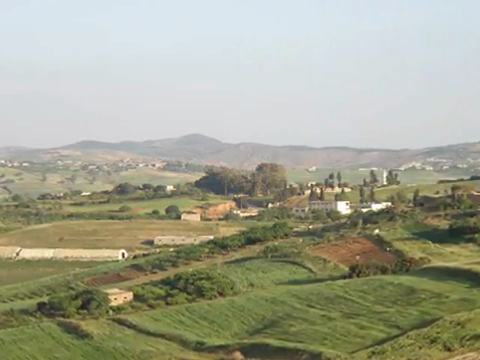
- Sidi Lakhdar

- Location within Algeria
- Coordinates: 36.1428°N 0.460556°E
- Country: Algeria
- Province: Mostaganem Province
- District: Sidi Lakhdar District

Area
  - Total: 54 sq mi (140 km^{2})

Population (2008)
  - Total: 34,612
- Time zone: UTC+1 (CET)
- CP: 27007

Sidi Lakhdar (Arabic: سيدي لخضر) is a town and commune in Mostaganem Province, Algeria, about 300 km west of the capital, Algiers. It is the capital of Sidi Lakhdar District. According to the 1998 census, it has a population of 30,950. Under French colonial rule, the town was known as Lapasset. It changed its name in 1962.
