= Sour, Algeria =

Sour الصور
- Commune and town
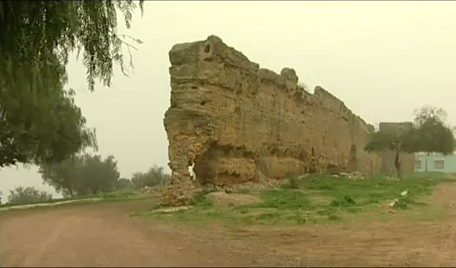

- Location within Algeria
- Coordinates: 36°0′2″N 0°20′29″E
- Country: Algeria
- Province: Mostaganem Province
- District: Aïn Tédelès District

Population (1998)
  - Total: 20,625
- Time zone: UTC+1 (CET)

Sour is a town and commune in Mostaganem Province, Algeria. It is located in Aïn Tédelès District. According to the 1998 census, it has a population of 20,625.
