= Mohamed Lakhdar Maougal =

Algerian writer

Mohamed Lakhdar Maougal is an Algerian philosopher. A specialist in the philosophy of language and sociolinguistics, he is the author of several books, including studies of Kateb Yacine and Albert Camus.
