= Ouled Boughalem =

Ouled Boughalem ⴰⵝ ⵓⵖⴰⵍⴻⵎ
- Commune and town
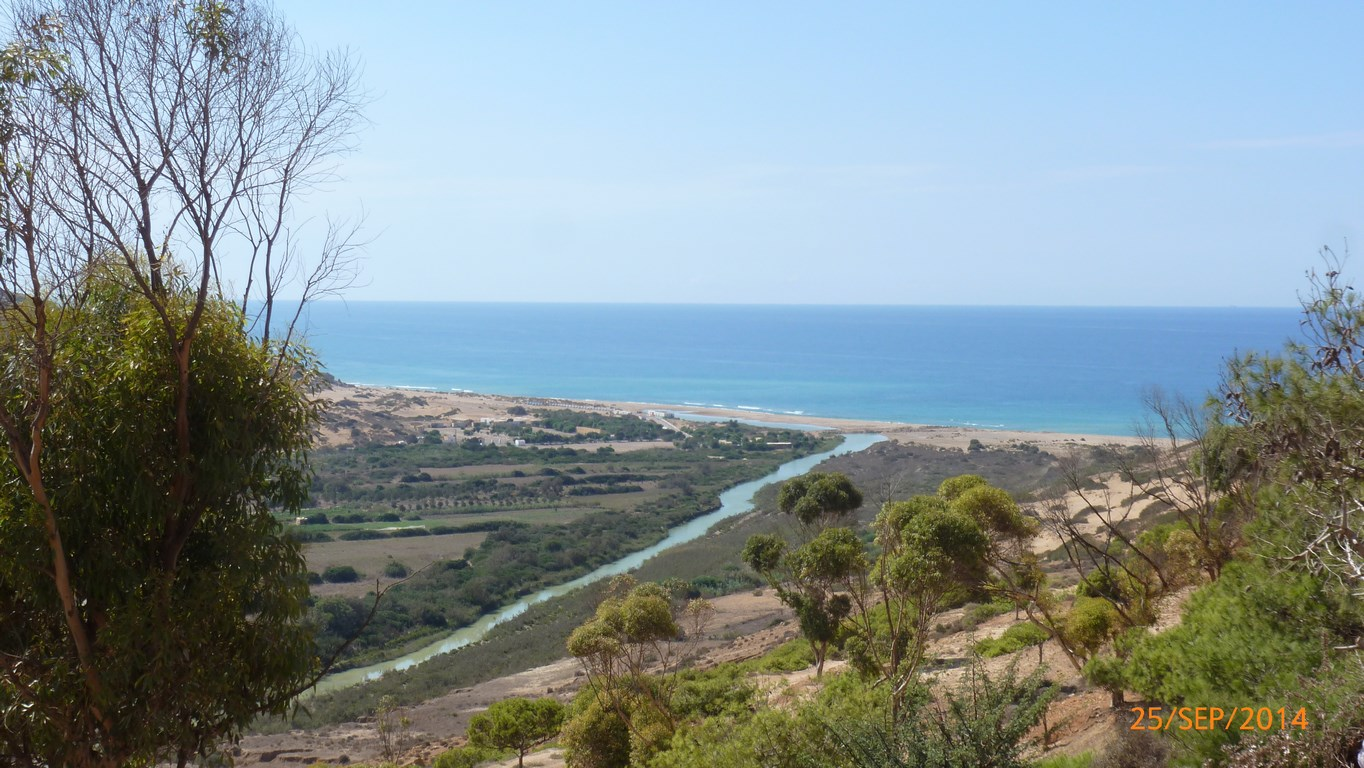

- Location within Algeria
- Country: Algeria
- Province: Mostaganem Province
- District: Achacha District

Population (1998)
  - Total: 11,886
- Time zone: UTC+1 (CET)

Ouled Boughalem is a town and commune in Mostaganem Province, Algeria. It is located in Achacha District. According to the 1998 census it has a population of 11,886.
