= Stidia =

- Commune and town
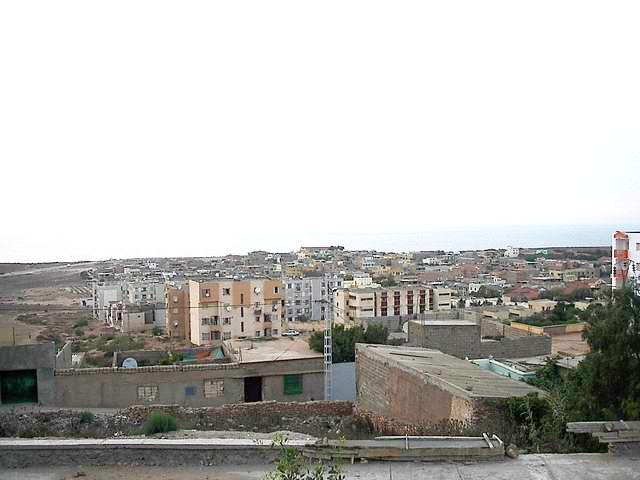

- Location within Algeria
- Coordinates: 35°50′N 0°18′W
- Country: Algeria
- Province: Mostaganem Province
- District: Hassi Mamèche District
- Established: 2012-2017

Government
  - Maire: Si-Djillali Hamou

Area
  - Total: 21 sq mi (55 km^{2})

Population (2008)
  - Total: 11,965
- Time zone: UTC+1 (CET)
- Postal code: 27150

Stidia is a small town and commune in Hassi Mamèche District, Mostaganem Province, Algeria. In 1998 the commune had a total population of 10,688.

== Situation ==
Stidia is located 15 km (9.3 mi) from Mostaganem, the wilaya (province) capital, and 65 km (40 mi) from Oran, the country's second largest city. A four-lane highway links both cities, via Stidia. The city is located on the Greenwich meridian.

== Name ==
The name of Stidia derives from an old fountain named Aïn Stidia. The town was first named La Stidia, before being renamed Georges Clémenceau by the French, after World War I.

According to Salim Ammar who was born in the territory of Stidia, this town was named in the 15th century by the Moors Istija (إستجة) in honor of their lost city in Andalucia, the current Écija. The German settlers later in the 19th century mispronounced the Arabic name and it became Stidia or Stidya.

== History ==
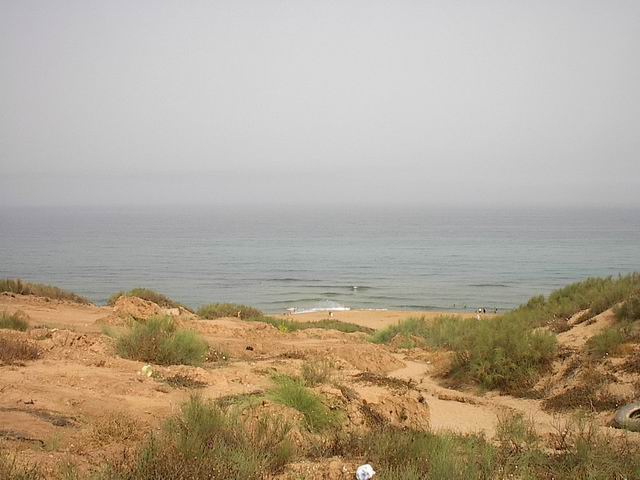
A beach in Stidia

Before the foundation of the European settlement down the hill, the Moors who were expelled from Spain after 1492, founded the original Stidia on the hill and it is called now "Douar" Stidia to differentiate it from " Village" Stidia which is the part built during the French occupation. The moorish influence is obvious in the territory of Stidia and Fornaka. The ethnic groups living in the territory keep the remembrance of the epic History of the fighting against the Spanish crusades.

Although the fountain Aïn Stidia existed for some time, the town was founded in 1846, by German settlers who tried to emigrate to South America, but were directed to Algeria, after being abandoned in Dunkerque, France by a dishonest conveyor. The settlement was first helped by French soldiers who left in 1948. Although Algeria was a French colony at the time, the inhabitants continued to speak German until about the first World War. At the independence of Algeria (1962), the town was renamed Stidia (from Georges Clémenceau).

== Demographics ==
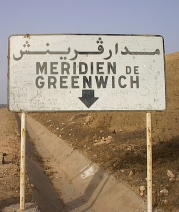
Greenwich meridian in Stidia

- 1866 : 486
- 1958 : 1.301
- 2002 : 11.500

== Attractions ==
=== Beaches ===
The beaches in the Stidia region attract many tourists (mainly Algerians from Mostaganem and surroundings) during the summer. Although not the best ones of the western Algerian coast, they still offer good recreation opportunities. There is often a guarded parking (for a small fee) in front of the beach. The nearest accommodation is in Mostaganem (15 km), or, to a greater extent, in Oran (65 km). There are no hotels in Stidia.

=== Greenwich meridian ===
A plate indicates the crossing of the Greenwich meridian, on the Mostaganem-Oran highway.
