= Mostaganem Province =

Province of Algeria

Mostaganem Province ولاية مستغانم
- Province
- Map of Algeria highlighting Mostaganem
- Coordinates: 35°56′N 0°05′E
- Country: Algeria
- Capital: Mostaganem

Area
  - Total: 2,269 km^{2} (876 sq mi)

Population (2008)
  - Total: 746,947
  - Density: 329.2/km^{2} (852.6/sq mi)
- Time zone: UTC+01 (CET)
- Area Code: +213 (0) 45
- ISO 3166 code: DZ-27
- Districts: 10
- Municipalities: 32

Mostaganem (Arabic: ولاية مستغانم) is a province (wilaya) of Algeria, with a population of 892165 inhabitants in 2019, with a density of 393/square kilometers. Its capital is Mostaganem.

== Geography ==
The land relief in Mostaganem Province can be divided into four regions: the Dahra Range to the east, the Mostaganem Plateau to the south, the Chelif River valley which separates the two highland regions, and the plains on the province's southern border which lie next to the marshes of the Macta.

The Mostaganem Plateau covers eleven municipalities in the southern part of the province: Mostaganem, Ain Tedles, Sour, Bouguirat, Sirat, Souaflia, Mesra, Ain Sidi Cherif, Mansourah, Touahria and Sayada. It is a semi-arid and sandy plateau, in the shape of a triangle and bounded to the north by the Chelif River. It receives 350 mm of rainfall per year.

During French colonization, viticulture was introduced on the plateau. After the country's independence, it was replaced by irrigated market gardening and the culture of citrus fruits and cereals. However, in certain sectors east of Mostaganem, the replacement of the vineyards caused the appearance of small dunes as a consequence of the resumption of soil movement.

== History ==
In 1984 Relizane Province was carved out of its territory.

== Administrative divisions ==
The province is divided into 10 districts (daïras), which are further divided into 32 communes or municipalities.

=== Districts ===
1. Achacha
2. Aïn Nouïssy
3. Aïn Tédelès
4. Bouguirat
5. Hassi Mamèche
6. Kheïr Eddine
7. Mesra
8. Mostaganem
9. Sidi Ali
10. Sidi Lakhdar

=== Communes ===
1. Achacha (Achaacha)
2. Aïn Boudinar
3. Aïn Nouïssy
4. Aïn Sidi Chérif
5. Aïn Tédelès (Ain Tedles)
6. Benabdelmalek Ramdane (Abdelmalek Ramdane)
7. Bouguirat
8. El Hassaine
9. Fornaka
10. Hadjadj
11. Hassi Mamèche (Hasi Mameche)
12. Khadra
13. Kheïr Eddine (Kheiredine)
14. Mansourah
15. Mazagran (Mazagrain, Mezghrane)
16. Mesra
17. Mostaganem
18. Nékmaria
19. Oued El Kheïr
20. Ouled Boughalem
21. Ouled Malah (Ouled Maalef)
22. Safsaf (Saf Saf)
23. Sayada
24. Sidi Ali
25. Sidi Bellater (Sidi Belatar)
26. Sidi Lakhdar (Sidi Lakhdaara)
27. Sirat
28. Souaflia
29. Sour
30. Stidia
31. Tazgait
32. Touahria
