= Sayada, Algeria =

Town in Mostaganem Province, Algeria

Sayada
- Commune and town
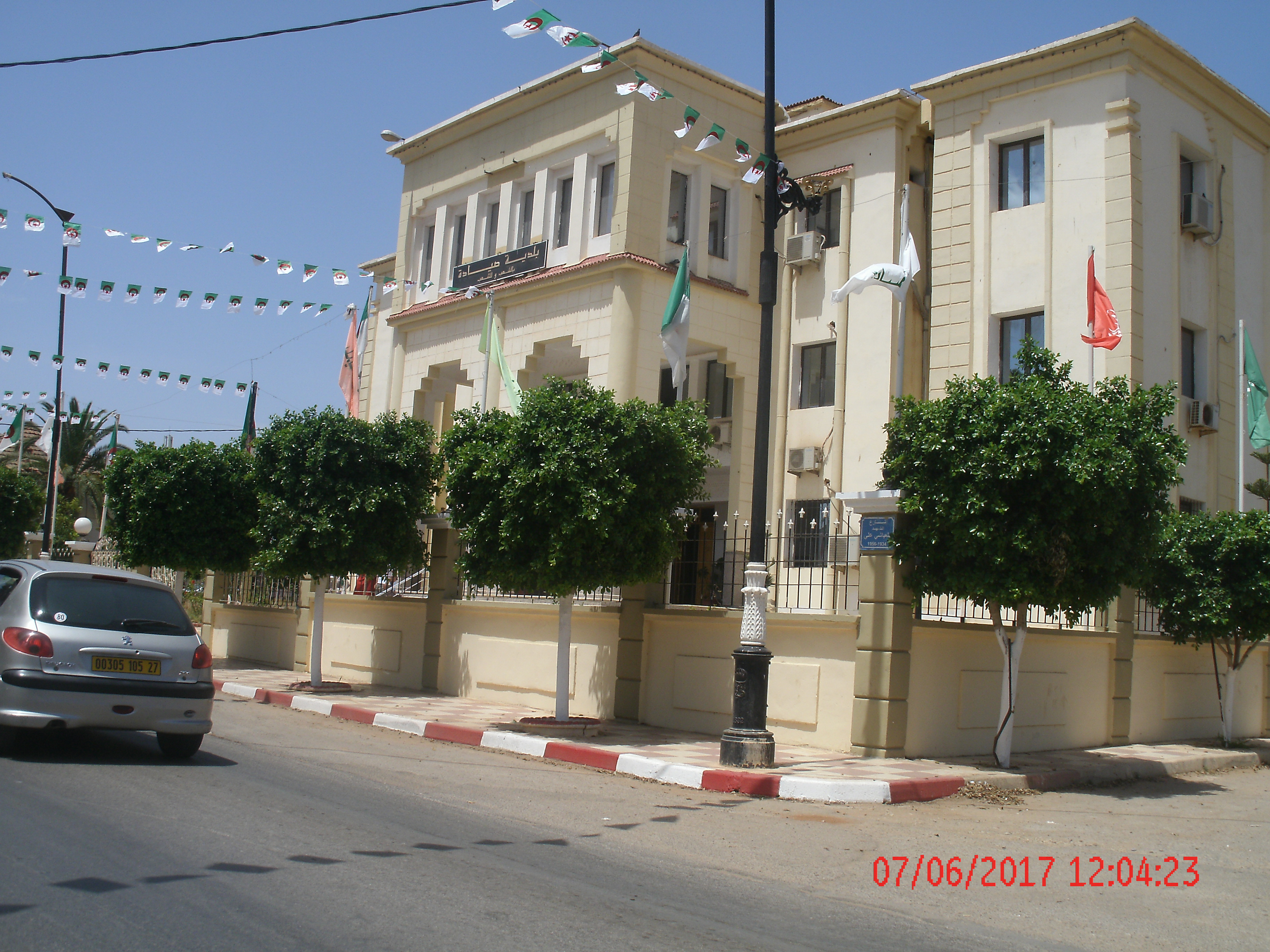

- Location within Algeria
- Country: Algeria
- Province: Mostaganem Province
- District: Kheïr Eddine District

Population (1998)
  - Total: 21,900
- Time zone: UTC+1 (CET)

Sayada is a town and commune in Mostaganem Province, Algeria. It is located in Kheïr Eddine District. According to the 1998 census it has a population of 21,900.
