= Khadra =

Khadra خضرة
- Commune and town
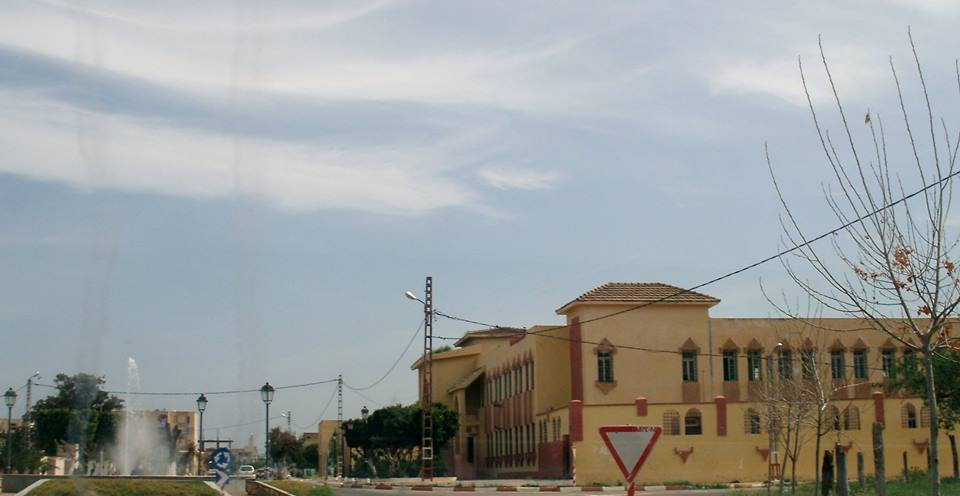

- Location within Algeria
- Coordinates: 36.25°N 0.5833°E
- Country: Algeria
- Province: Mostaganem Province
- District: Achacha District

Area
  - Total: 31 sq mi (80 km^{2})

Population (2008)
  - Total: 14,045
- Time zone: UTC+1 (CET)

Khadra is a town and commune in Mostaganem Province, Algeria. It is located in Achacha District. According to the 1998 census it has a population of 12,294.
