= Aïn Tedles =

Aïn Tedles عين تادلس Aïn Tédelès
- Commune and town
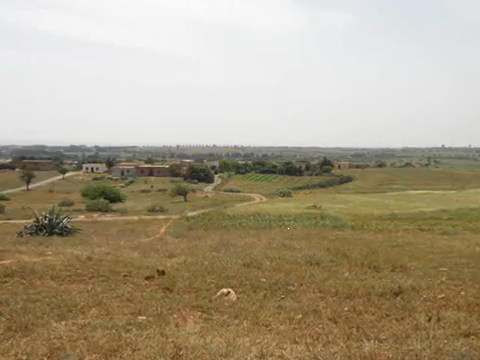

- Location within Algeria
- Coordinates: 35°59′41″N 0°17′44″E
- Country: Algeria
- Province: Mostaganem Province
- District: Aïn Tedles District

Area
  - Total: 33 sq mi (86 km^{2})

Population (2008)
  - Total: 38,823
- Time zone: UTC+1 (CET)

Aïn Tédelès is a town and commune in Mostaganem Province, Algeria. It is the capital of Aïn Tédelès District. According to the 1998 census it has a population of 31,685.
