= Hadjadj =

- Commune and town
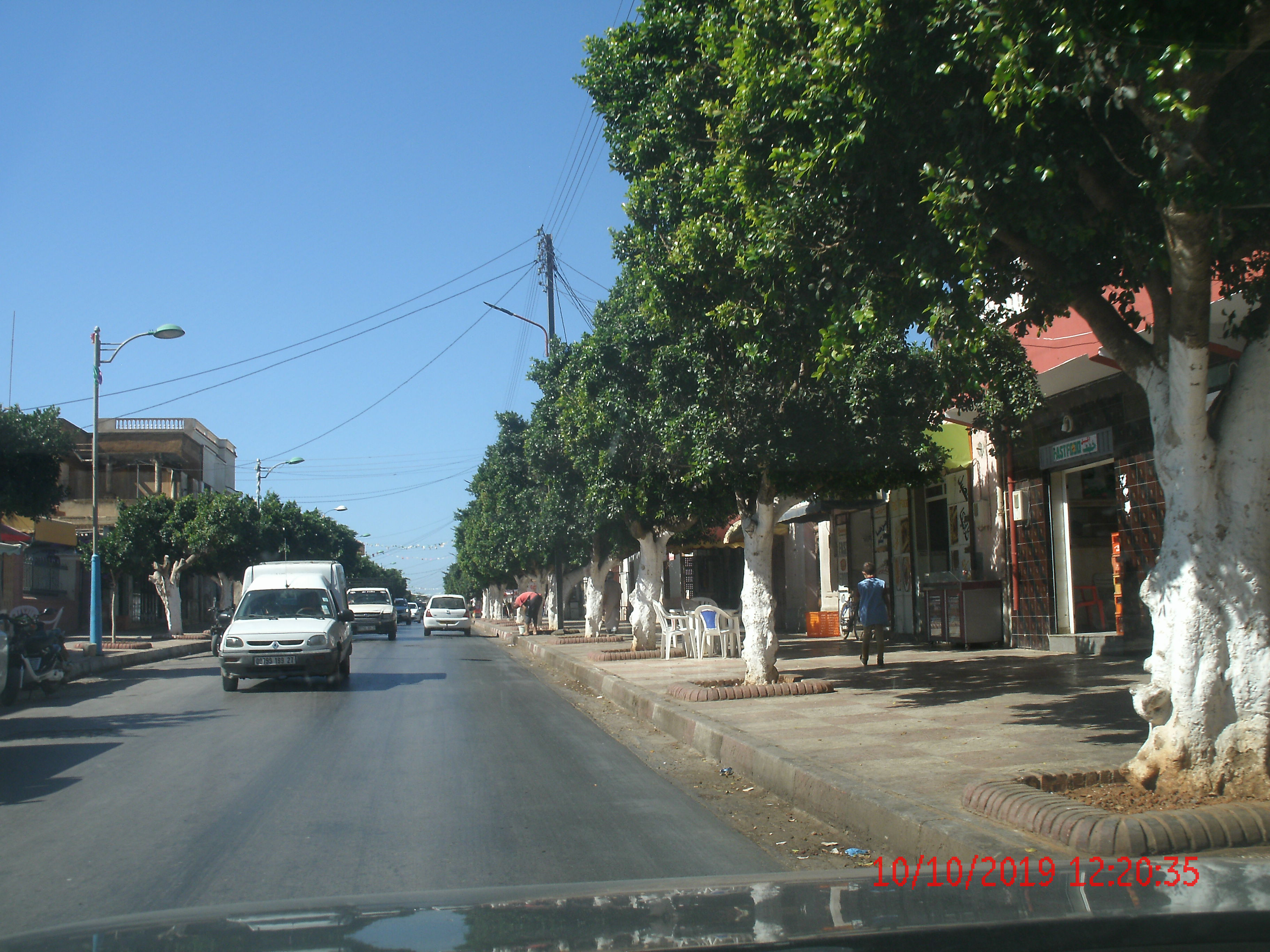

- Location within Algeria
- Country: Algeria
- Province: Mostaganem Province

Population (1998)
  - Total: 15,835
- Time zone: UTC+1 (CET)

Hadjadj is a town and commune in Mostaganem Province, Algeria. According to the 1998 census it has a population of 15,835.
