= Aernoult–Rousset affair =

French social and political conflict over a death at a French Algerian military prison

Aernoult funerals in 1912

In the Aernoult–Rousset affair, the French Left organized to protest France's North African military prisons and expatriate the body of a conscript who died there in 1909. While the military classified Albert Aernoult's death as a stroke, the witness Émile Rousset claimed that the conscript had been assault by their commanding officers. After the Chamber of Deputies backed the military's account and a war council sentenced Rousset to prison for insubordination, French socialists began to organize to repatriate Aernoult's corpse, free Rousset, and close the Algerian military prisons. The affair demonstrated how the French antimilitarist Left, normally prone to infighting, could unify.

== Death of Aernoult ==
Albert Aernoult was a poor laborer from Romainville, east of Paris. After participating in a local road workers strike, he spent ten months in jail. Councillor of State Pierre Gilbert de Voisins convinced him to join the French army, but Aernoult did not know this meant the African battalion. Aernoult, unhappy and rebellious, was transferred to a disciplinary unit.

He died in Algeria on July 2, 1909, two years after his arrest. Though his parents had recently received a letter from Aernoult that mentioned his fine health, the official military letter following his death claimed that Aernoult had gone into a rage that day and had a stroke. Émile Rousset, who served in Aernoult's military unit, claimed otherwise. He said he saw Aernoult's commanding officers beat him to death. Rousset spoke out and was imprisoned for his disobedience. He wrote letters to Aernoult's parents and Parisian journals. Le Matin covered the story and by mid-November, so had L'Humanité and La Guerre Sociale.

In mid-November, socialist deputy Jean Allemane interpellated France's war minister on Aernoult's cause of death. The minister's subsequent inquiry, a formality, maintained the cause as stroke. Deputy Adrien Veber read the chamber a letter on from 15 members of Aernoult's unit attributing the cause of death to their commanding officers. This did not sway the Chamber of Deputies, who voted overwhelmingly to close the interpellation.

== Escalation ==
Rousset continued to speak out about Aernoult's death with the backing of antimilitarists. He was invited to speak with the Oran war council on the pretense of sharing his account of Aernoult's death, but ultimately to be tried for insubordination and sentenced to five years in prison, on February 2, 1910. Socialists at the Nîmes Congress swiftly responded with a motion denouncing the sentence and plans for a new probe. The cause ignited the French Left—socialists, anarchists, and syndicalists alike—who held meetings, postered, and protested. Their threefold aims were to repatriate Aernoult's corpse, free Rousset, and close the Algerian military prisons. L'Humanité began a fund to exhume and return Aernoult's body to France, as his parents wanted.

The next month, a "down with Biribi" poster campaign, using the pejorative term for the North African military and its prisons, proved successful. The Comité de Défense Sociale (CDS) created the poster, having been formed from anarchist groups in 1905. Its 16 signers contended that Rousset's sentence was a crime to cover up the crime of Aernoult's death, and encouraged soldiers to desert and kill their officers. They were acquitted in their subsequent trial, arguing that revolutionary action was ethical when legal action did not solve the issue of military prisons. Their trial was aided by an autopsy of Aernoult, which found external physical violence to Aernoult's corpse, corroborating Rousset's story. The French Left was morally embolded by the trial to act against the military prisons. La Voix du Peuple and La Guerre Sociale each published on the affair in July, and a group organized by Émile Aubin stirred popular opinion again with their "decorated murderers" poster in September.

== Legacy ==
The affair demonstrated how the French antimilitarist Left, normally prone to infighting, could unify for a cause, namely the repatriation of Aernoult's corpse and a protest against military prisons.

== Bibliography ==
- Cerullo, John J. (1996). "The Aernoult-Rousset Agitation, 1909-1912: A Proletarian Dreyfus Affair?". Proceedings of the Western Society for French History. 24. hdl:2027/spo.0642292.0024.016. ISSN 2573-5012.
- Cerullo, John (July 31, 2008). "The Aernoult-Rousset Affair: Military Justice on Trial in Belle Époque France". Historical Reflections / Réflexions Historiques. 34: 4–24. doi:10.3167/hrrh2008.340202.
- Cerullo, John (2011). Minotaur: French Military Justice and the Aernoult-Rousset Affair. Cornell University Press. ISBN 978-1-60909-051-7. JSTOR 10.7591/j.ctv177tfdc.
- Miller-Melamed, Paul (2001). From Revolutionaries to Citizens: Antimilitarism in France, 1870-1914. Durham: Duke University Press. ISBN 978-0-8223-2757-8. OCLC 659894924.
