= Belle (gambling game) =

Belle is a lottery-like gambling game, similar to Biribi and Cavagnole, that was brought from Italy to Paris in the 17th century.

It needs a board with 104 numbers in 13 rows of 8 numbers, on which - similar to roulette - the bets are placed, and a bag containing 104 numbers from which the winning number is drawn.

Depending on the agreement, 100 times or 96 times the bet will be refunded in the event of a win, i.e. the odds are 99:1 or 95:1, respectively, the bank advantage is 4/104 = 3.85% or 8/104 = 7.69%.

In addition to betting on a single number, punters may also bet on a row of 13 numbers or a column of 8.

"Belle (with boards and numbers)" was included in the list of games prohibited in Austria-Hungary by the Imperial and Royal Ministry of Justice.

== Sources ==
- Von Alvensleben, Ludwig (1853). Encyclopädie der Spiele, 1st edn. Leipzig: Otto Weigand.
- Brockhaus Konversationslexikon von 1894/96
- Meyers Konversationslexikon von 1888
