= Bataillon d'Infanterie légère d'Outre-Mer =

1948 French formation of German prisoners

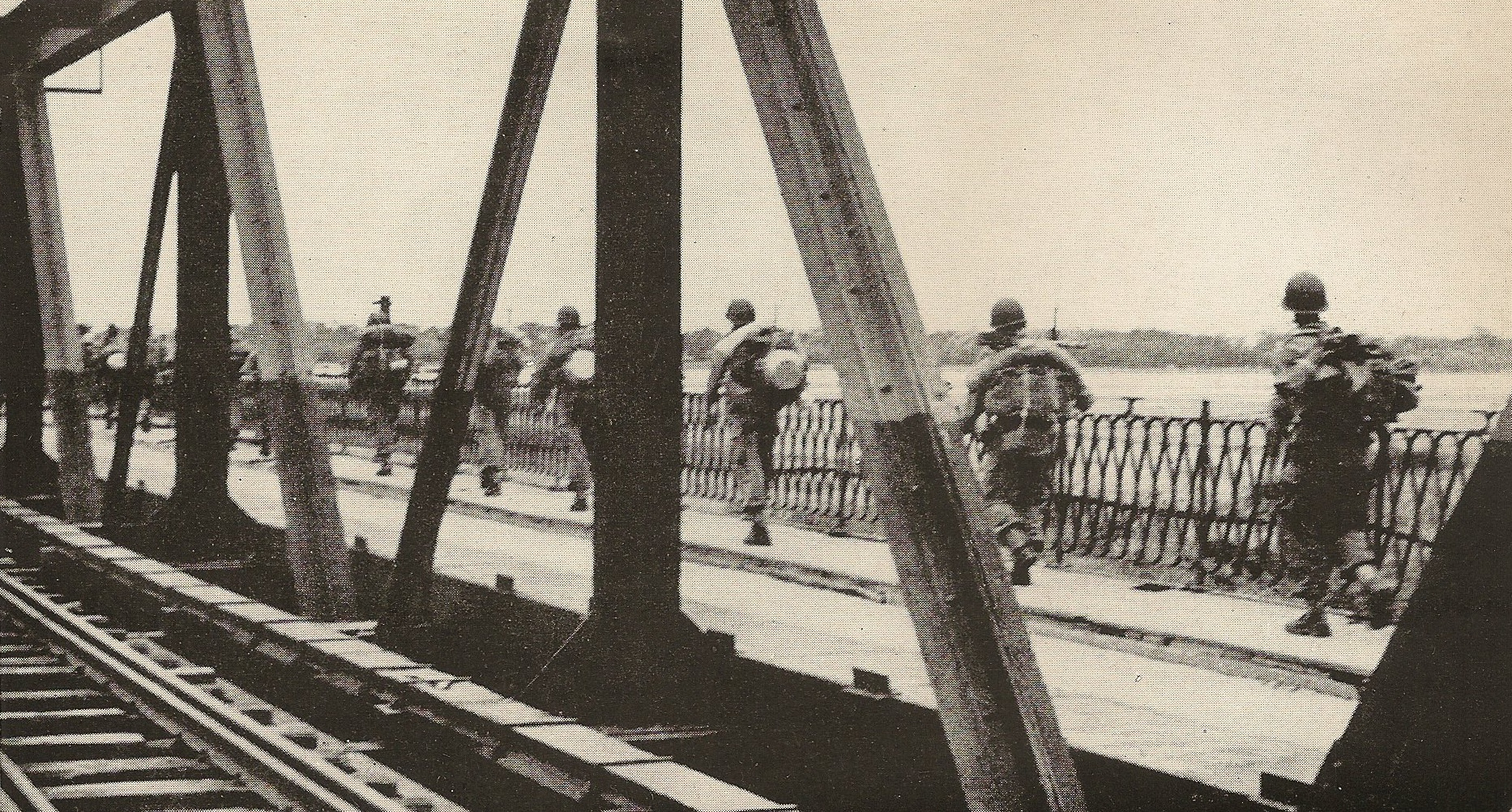
French troops in Indochina

The Overseas Light Infantry Battalion (French: Bataillon d'Infanterie légère d'Outre-Mer, BILOM) was an obscure and little known French formation of German prisoners of war and French collaborationists drawn from the French penal system and prisoner-of-war camps after World War II for colonial service. BILOM comprised a demi-brigade of three battalions, the first of which entered service on July 6, 1948 as the "1re Bataillon d'Infanterie légère d'Outre-Mer".

== History ==
Envisaged as an occupation and policing force for France's overseas colonial possessions like French Guiana and French Polynesia, BILOM was conceived on May 27, 1948, when Minister of Justice André Marie sent a memorandum to the French prison system's regional directors enquiring as to the number of political prisoners who might be interested in serving overseas to "make amends vis-à-vis the nation".

BILOM units were not originally intended for the front line counter-insurgency campaigns they later fought, but rather, were viewed as replacements for the French Foreign Legion (FFL) troops deployed throughout the French colonial empire who were desperately needed in the First Indochina War.

The ranks of BILOM included former members of the German Wehrmacht, Waffen-SS, Kriegsmarine, and French collaborationist organizations like the Milice and the Legion of French Volunteers Against Bolshevism (LVF), and Frenchmen who served voluntarily in the German armed forces, including in the SS Charlemagne Division.

Enlistments in BILOM would be for a period of three, four or five years, depending on the duration of the sentence remaining to be served. Prisoners with outstanding sentences longer than 15 years were ineligible, as were men over 40.

BILOM units were not part of the FFL, and they were structured as light infantry with no heavy weapons. And although the men would be released from prison, they were not offered legal amnesty—only a suspensive pardon. Furthermore, the former prisoners would not provide officers for BILOM units, who would instead be transferred from the French colonial troops. They were not eligible for promotion, wore no insignia and carried no pennant or unit flag. Nevertheless, according to Dr. Krisztian Bene of the University of Pécs, successful completion of one's enlistment in BILOM offered national outcasts the chance for "reintegration into French society".

By late August 1948, less than 500 volunteers had joined BILOM, after the French Communist Party (PCF) orchestrated a propaganda campaign against the brigade. The PCF sought to incite public hostility towards the government's effort, and demanded "vengeance, justice and punishment" of collaborators.

== Disbandment ==
The BILOM was formally disbanded on 29 July 1949, although most of its personnel continued to serve in smaller detachments attached to locally recruited units in Southern Annam. They were eventually dispersed, some remaining with the French Army in Indochina and Algeria and other returning to civilian life.

== See also ==
- Battalions of Light Infantry of Africa
