= Battalions of Light Infantry of Africa =

Bataillons d'Infanterie Légère d'Afrique
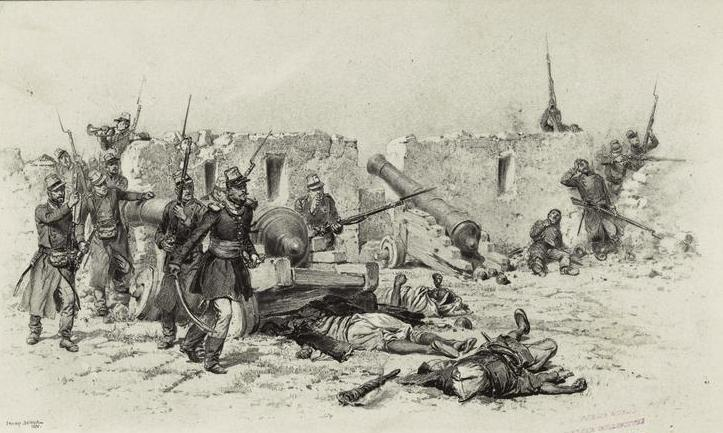
- Light Infantry of Africa in 1833, during the conquest of Algeria
- Active: 13 June 1832—31 March 1972
- Country: France
- Branch: French Army
- Type: Light infantry Penal military unit
- Role: Desert warfare Raiding; Trench warfare
- Garrison/HQ: Tataouine (French Tunisia)
- Nicknames: Bat' d'Af'; L'Enfer; Biribi
- March: "Les Bataillonnaires"
- Anniversaries: Battle of Mazagran (6 February)
- Engagements: French colonial Wars; French Intervention in Mexico; Crimean War; World War I World War II

The Battalions of Light Infantry of Africa (French: Bataillons d'Infanterie Légère d'Afrique or BILA), better known under the abbreviation Bat' d'Af', were French infantry and construction units, serving in Northern Africa, made up of men with prison records who still had to do their military service, or soldiers with serious disciplinary records.

== History ==
=== Creation ===
Created by King Louis Philippe I on 13 June 1832, shortly after the French Foreign Legion, the Bat' d'Af' were part of the Army of Africa and were stationed in Tataouine, Tunisia, in one of the most arid and hostile regions of the French colonial empire. The original Ordonnance royale (Royal order) creating this corps provided for 2 battalions, each of 8 companies. A third battalion was created in September 1833. According to the order the rank and file of these units were to be drawn from: (i) serving soldiers who had been sentenced to existing disciplinary companies and who had not completed their period of army service upon release; and (ii) civilian convicts who upon completing terms of imprisonment had still to meet their obligations for compulsory military service.

=== Initial service and major battles ===
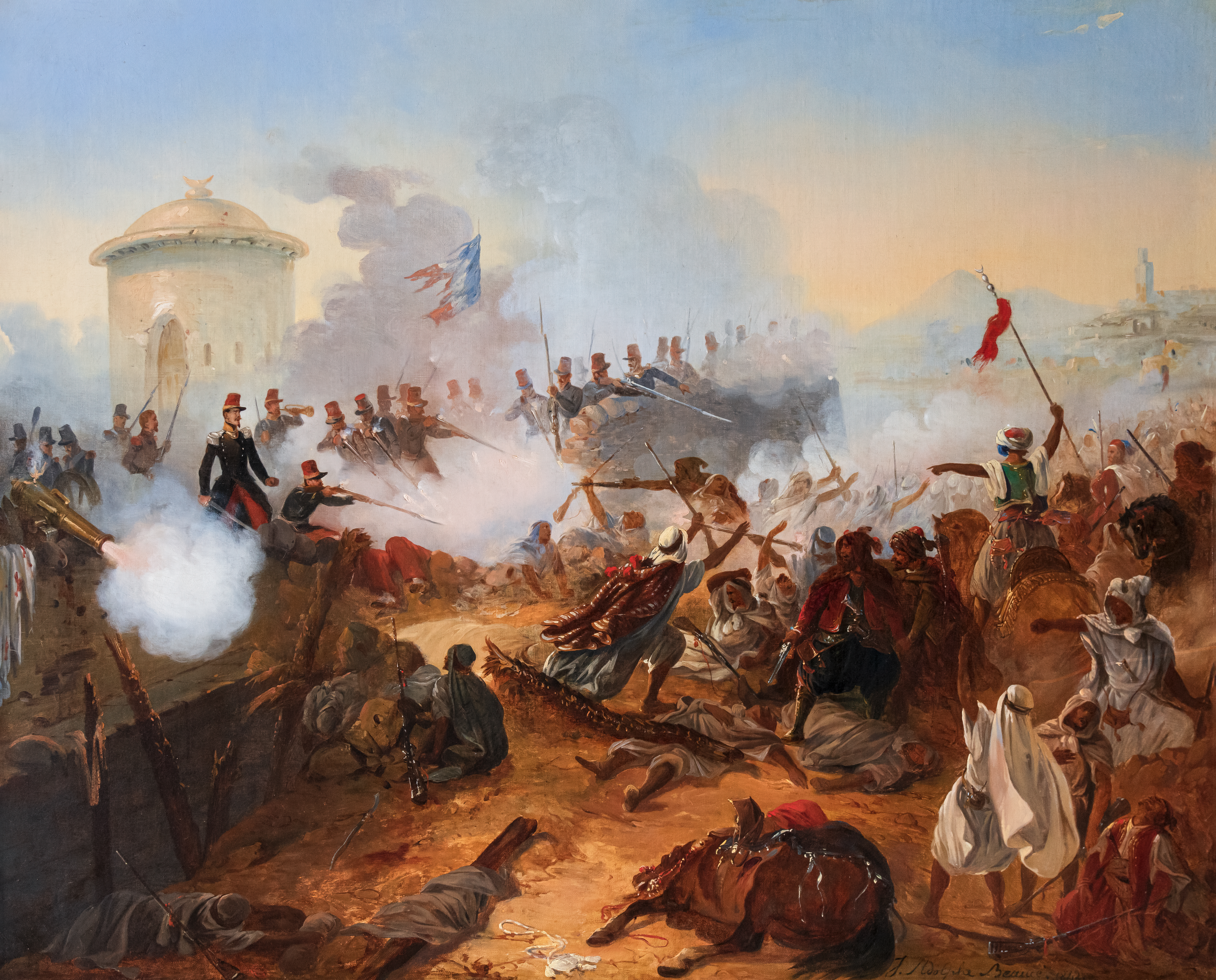
Captain Lelièvre's Heroic Defence at Mazagran by Jean-Adolphe Beaucé. The defence of Mazagran by the Light Infantry of Africa in 1840.

The newly raised Bat' d'Af' saw active service for the first time during the conquest of Algeria. They participated in operations at Bougie in 1835 and took part in the siege of Constantine the following year.

Between 3 and 6 February 1840 at the Battle of Mazagran in Algeria, a detachment of 123 chasseurs of the 1st BILA, under Captain Lelievre, held off repeated assaults by several thousand Arabs. This action won the first battle honour for the corps and was subsequently commemorated in all battalions by memorial ceremonies on 6 February each year.

In 1870 the BILA provided a temporary régiment de marche to serve in France during the Franco-Prussian War. On two occasions detached companies suffered heavy casualties during this campaign.

A platoon of the Bat' d'Af' served at the Battle of Taghit in 1903, when the French fort of Taghit was besieged by 4,000 Moroccan tribesmen, who were eventually repelled. All three battalions in existence in 1907 were assigned to active service in Morocco during the French occupation of that country. By 1914 the corps had been expanded to five battalions with depots in Oran, Morocco and Tunisia.

=== Subsequent history until 1920 ===
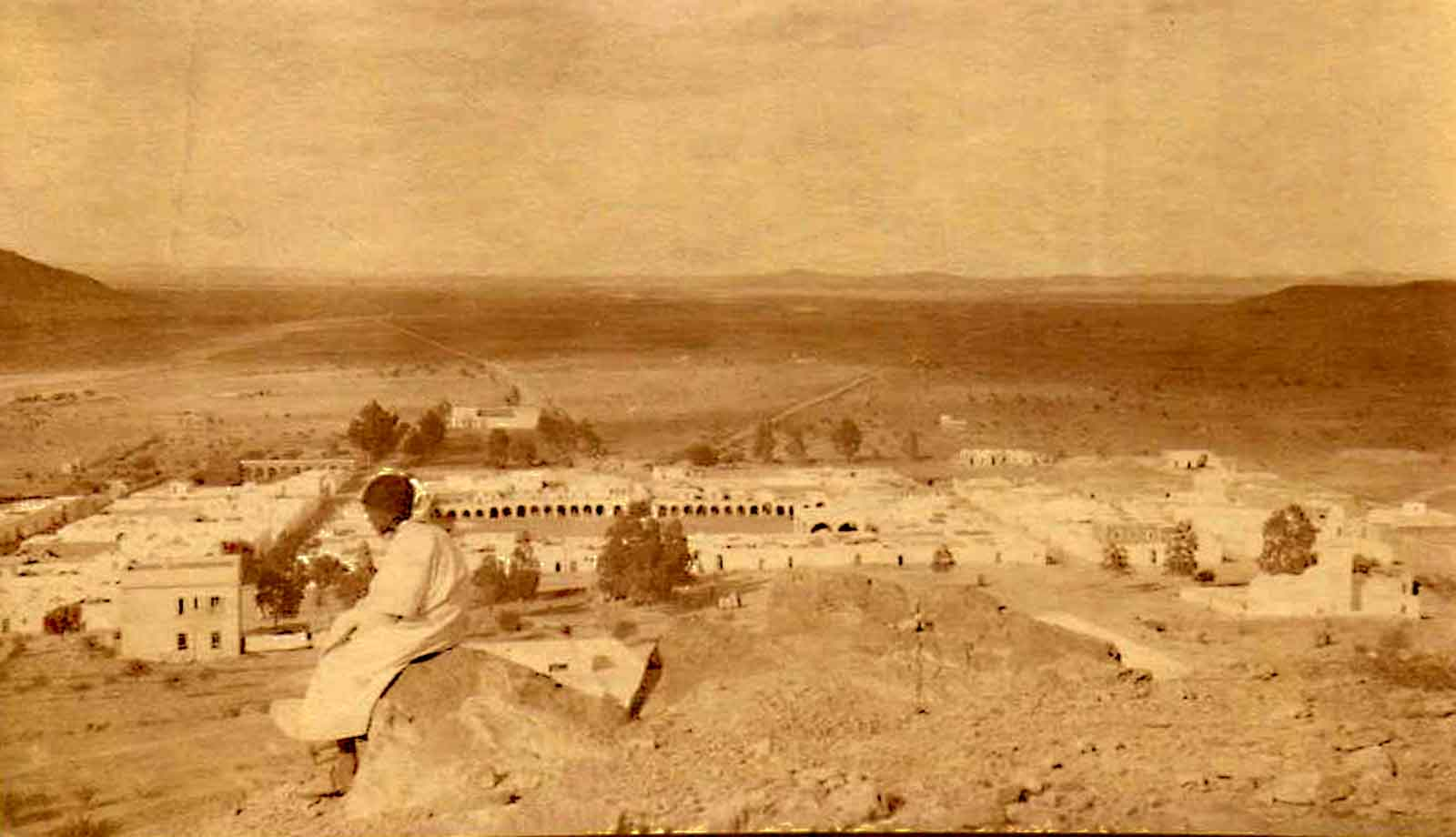
Tataouine circa 1925.

As discipline and living conditions in the Bat' d'Af' were harsh, Bataillonnaires, colloquially named Zéphyrs or Joyeux ("Joyous ones"), usually nicknamed their unit l'Enfer ("the Hell") or, ironically, Biribi (a game of chance of that period). However, they fought creditably in the Crimean War and the Mexican Intervention, and won honours during the First World War and in the various colonial wars. They also assumed the role of construction troops, building not only desert forts but also roads and bridges.

Biribi reached a peak in the 1880s and '90s, when it played its most conspicuous role. In May 1888 the corps was enlarged to 5 battalions, each made up of 6 companies. Three battalions (the 3rd, 4th and 5th) were based in Tunisia while the remaining units served in the southern districts of Algeria. A detachment of the 4th Battalion was posted to Indochina before 1914. Two battalions were on active service in Morocco on the eve of the First World War. During the war, three bataillons de marche (temporary "marching battalions" formed for particular purposes) served on the Western Front with distinction (see Battle Honours and Fourragères below). The permanent units remained in French North Africa, providing garrisons and mobile columns.

=== Character ===
One of the considerations behind the creation and expansion of the French army's disciplinary battalions was the need to resolve a seeming contradiction: men whose crimes in civilian life had resulted in the loss of civil rights gained an undeserved privilege in being exempted from military service. As their enlistment in regular units could have spread indiscipline among young serving soldiers, the solution was to draft them into separate disciplinary battalions.

The distinctive nature of these units meant that the average age of bataillonnaires was often older than that of the conscripts of metropolitan units called to do service at 20 years old. Where possible the Bats d'Af were garrisoned separately from regular French and colonial troops to prevent brawling.

Although the Bats d'Af are commonly described as penal units, their purpose was not punishment but segregation in what were officially described as "redemptive combat units" (corps d'epreuve). In addition to petty criminals and military offenders, the rank and file also included a number of soldiers suspected of Communard sympathies during the 1870s and the ringleaders of several mutinies in metropolitan regiments in the early 1900s. Finally, there were also some volunteers who chose for reasons of promotion or other motives to serve in the Bats d'Af.

In opposition to prevailing assumptions about criminality at the time, influenced by Cesare Lombroso's eugenistic theories, the disciplinary battalions of the French Republic were supposed to show that criminals could be redeemed through hard work and combat.

Legislation dated 21 March 1905 specified that individuals sentenced to prison terms of six months or more, or who had been convicted of any offence twice or more, should be drafted into the Bats d'Af when called up for military service. However those who distinguished themselves "in the face of the enemy", or who had concluded more than eight months of service with good behaviour in the Light Infantry of Africa, had the option of transferring to regular units of the army to complete their term of enlistment.

"Yesterday, they were "Apaches" (gangsters), anarchists, professional antimilitarists and thieves, delinquents filled with hatred of bourgeois society, men contemptuous of all morality, shirkers, pimps, knife-handlers, pickpockets... Today, they are soldiers."

— Louis Combe, military doctor

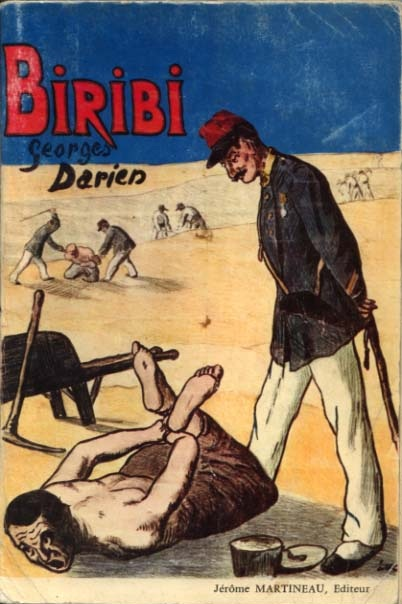
Biribi depicted by Maximilien Luce.

Georges Darien, a volunteer who enlisted in the Train (Army Transport Corps) during the 1880s where he was condemned for insubordination, was sent for 33 months in the Bat' d'Af'. In 1890, he published a novel named Biribi where he described, in possibly exaggerated terms, the harsh treatment and corporal punishments which he endured in the Bat' d'Af'.

Many Bataillonnaires displayed tattoos covering much of the body, as was customary in the French criminal underworld of the early 20th century (see examples here).

=== Interwar period and World War II ===
Their bad reputation and doubts about their efficiency as a mean of rehabilitation led to the dissolution of most Battalions of Light Infantry of Africa during the interwar period. Following the disbandment of the 1st and 2nd Battalions, serving personnel were transferred to the 3rd Battalion in 1927. In the course of France's general mobilisation in 1939, 12 additional Battalions of Light Infantry (BIL) were created but the historic title of Battalions of Light Infantry of Africa (BILA) was retained only by those units continuing to serve in French North Africa. During 1939-40 both the BIL and the BILA served primarily as construction units, working on fortifications, railways and roads in France, Algeria, Tunisia and Morocco. All were disbanded between July and October 1940 following the battle of France.

=== Final years and disbandment ===
A single company of the BILA was re-established in April 1944, becoming a full battalion in September 1948. It was based at Tataouine, the original garrison of the Bat' d'Af'. This formation provided a marching battalion, renamed the Bataillon d'Infanterie légère d'Outre-Mer (BILOM) which participated in the First Indochina War by manning a number of posts in the Bencat sector. Upon returning to Tunisia in November 1952 it was merged with the depot detachments of the BILA. Now designated as the 3rd BILA, the unit was transferred to Algeria following Tunisian independence in November 1956. The battalion was reduced to one company in October 1962, which was stationed near the French nuclear testing facilities in the Sahara from 1963 to 1966. This last remaining component of the Bat' d'Af' was then transferred to French Somaliland where it was disbanded on 31 March 1972.

Between 600,000 and 800,000 men served in the Bat' d'Af' from 1832 to 1970, mostly from the working class of Paris and Marseille.

== Uniforms and insignia ==
Throughout most of their history the Bat' d'Af' wore the uniform of the French line infantry, modified according to the overseas conditions under which they had to serve and with some regimental distinctions. The latter included yellow piping on the blue and red kepi, yellow collar numbers, and for full dress, red epaulettes with green woollen fringes. As light infantry the Bat' d'Af' wore silver buttons and rank braiding rather than the bronze or gold of the line regiments. A bugle horn appeared on buttons and other insignia.

Prior to 1914, the most commonly worn uniform of these units was white fatigue dress with white covered kepi and blue waist sash. In colder weather a short dark blue jacket (veste) was authorised with the battalion number in yellow on the collar. The medium blue greatcoat of the French infantry was worn on the march. A full dress uniform of dark blue tunic and red trousers (white trousers in hot weather) could be worn on parade or for off-duty wear. From World War I onwards the Bat' d'Af' were distinguished by "violet" (light purple/red) collar patch braiding and numbers on their khaki drill uniforms.

From 1915, in common with other units of the Armée d'Afrique, a more practical khaki uniform was adopted for service on the Western Front. Khaki pith helmets appeared during the 1920s and 30s as an alternative to the kepi, which itself could be worn with khaki or white covers according to the occasion. White dress uniforms were reserved for cadres.

== Absence of flags ==
A peculiarity of the BILA was that until 1952 the various battalions did not have the right to carry standards, although this was a universal privilege accorded to other French army regiments. Entitlement to this and other distinctions was persistently argued by the "Association of Former Officers of the Joyeux" chaired by General Alfred Maurice Cazaud.

== March ==
The march of the Bat d'Af is Les Bataillonnaires:

French	English
1er couplet: Il est sur la terre africaine Un bataillon dont les soldats, dont les soldats Sont tous des gars qu'ont pas eu d'veine C'est les Bat' d'Af', oui nous voilà, oui nous voilà! Pour être "Joyeux", chose spéciale Faut être passé par Biribi, par Biribi ! Ou bien alors d'une Centrale C'est d'ailleurs là qu'on nous choisit, qu'on nous choisit ! Refrain Mais après tout, qu'est-ce que ça fout ! Et l'on s'en fout ! En marchant sur la grand' route Souviens-toi, oui souviens-toi, oui souviens-toi Les Anciens l'ont fait sans doute Avant toi, oui avant toi, ah! ah! ah! ah! De Gafsa à Médenine De Gabès à Tataouine Sac au dos dans la poussière Marchons bataillonnaires ! 2ème couplet: J'ai vu mourir un pauvre gosse Un pauvre gosse de vingt ans Plombé par les balles féroces Il est mort en criant maman Je lui ai fermé les paupières J'ai cueilli son dernier soupir J'ai écrit à sa pauvre mère Qu'un légionnaire ça sait mourir (Refrain) 3ème couplet: Mais comme on n'a jamais eu d'veine Bien sûr un jour, on y crèvera Dans cette putain d'terre africaine sous le sable on nous enfouira Avec pour croix une baïonnette À l'endroit ousqu’on s’ra tombé Qui voulez-vous qui nous regrette Nous ne sommes que des réprouvés (Refrain)	1st verse: There is on African soil A battalion whose soldiers, whose soldiers Are all guys who had no luck It is the Bat 'Af', yes here we are, yes here we are! To be "Joyeux", a special thing, You must have been through Biribi, through Biribi! Or coming from a penitentiary This is where we were picked up, we were picked up! Chorus: But after all, why do we care(*)! And we don't care! When walking on the open road Remember, yes remember, yes remember The veterans did it probably Before you, yes before you, ah! ah! ah! ah! From Gafsa to Medenine From Gabès to Tataouine Backpacking in the dust Let's march bataillonnaires! 2nd verse: I saw a poor kid dying A twenty-year-old poor kid Pierced by wild bullets He died screaming "mom" I closed his eyelids I picked his last breath I wrote to his poor mother That a legionnaire(**) knows how to die (Repeat Chorus:) 3rd verse: But as we never had any luck Of course one day we will die here On this fucking African soil Under the sand we'll be buried With a bayonet as a cross At the place where we have fallen Who do you think will regret us We are only forsaken ones. (Repeat Chorus:)

(*) note that "on s'en fout" would be more accurately translated into "we don't give a fuck" than "we don't care"

(**) in other versions "soldier" (soldat). The Bat' d'Af was a separate corps from the French Foreign Legion.

== Battalions ==
=== 1^{er} BILA ===
Formed in 1832; disbanded in 1940

=== 2^{e} BILA ===
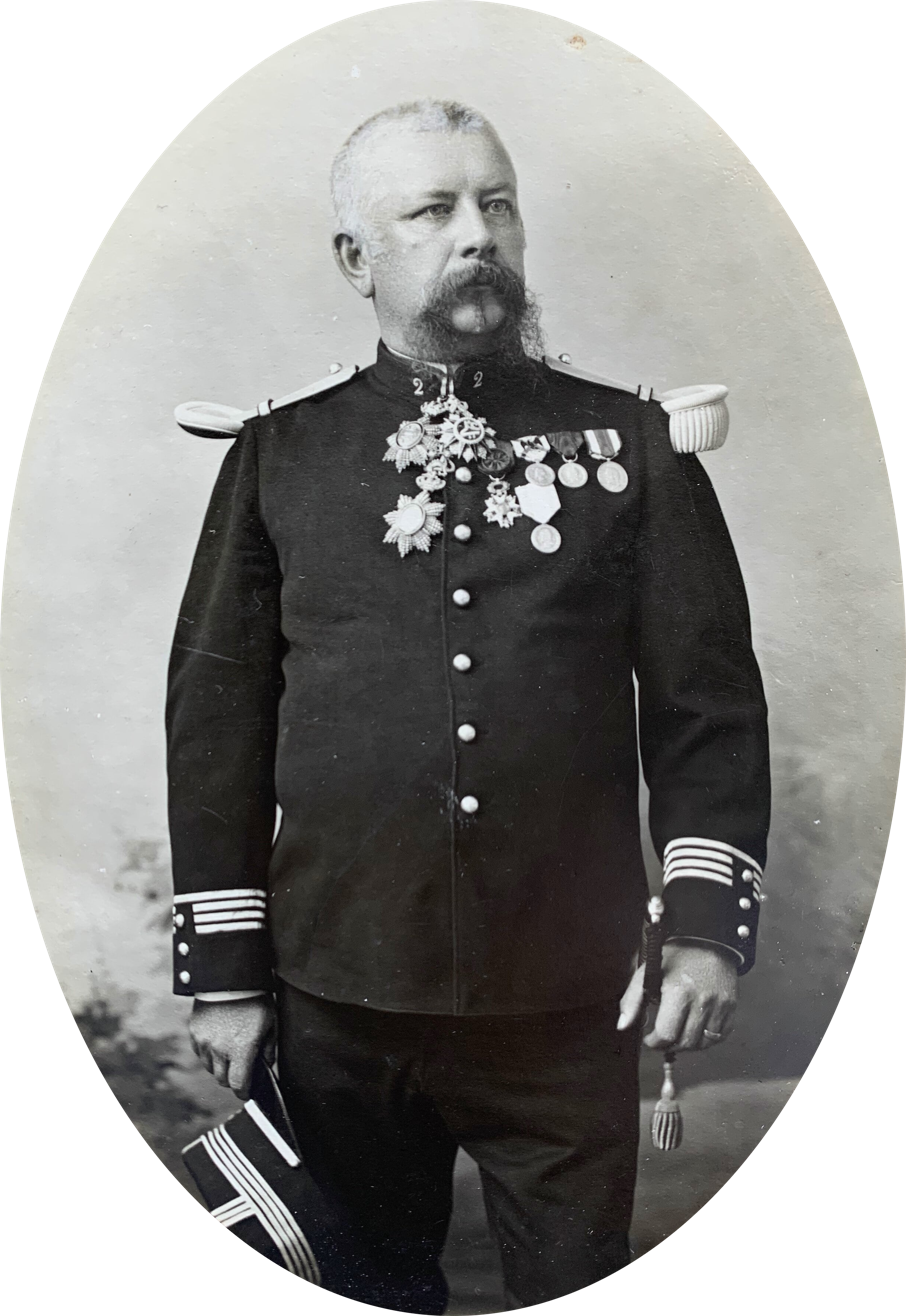
Antoine Léonor de Perier (1842-1908), commander of the 2nd BILA

Formed in 1832; disbanded in 1927. Created by order of 3 June 1832 at Birkhadem, stationed at Bougie, then at Laghouat (Algiers) in 1905. On 1 January 1849, the 2nd BILA, under the command of battalion commander Etienney, was garrisoned at Miliana in Algeria.

On 28 November 1870, during the Franco-Prussian war, the battle of Beaune-la-Rolande took place where two companies of the 2nd BILA, which made up the African Light Infantry Regiment, were engaged. From 1887 to 1896, the battalion was commanded by Antoine Léonor de Perier, father of general Pierre-Étienne de Perier. In operation in Morocco, with depots in Mcheyda and El Hadjeb in 19146. During the 1914-1918 war, the 2nd BILA remained stationed in North Africa, but contributed to the formation of the 1st, 2nd and 3rd BMILA, which were called up to fight in Belgium and in metropolitan France. It was disbanded in 1927, after the end of the Rif war. In 1939, it was reconstituted in embryonic form (a single company) in Corsica.

=== 3^{e} BILA ===
Formed in 1833; disbanded in 1972

=== 4^{e} BILA ===
Formed in 1888; disbanded in 1927

=== 5^{e} BILA ===
Formed in 1888; disbanded in 1925

== Fourragères ==
Those units received the fourragères of the following medals :

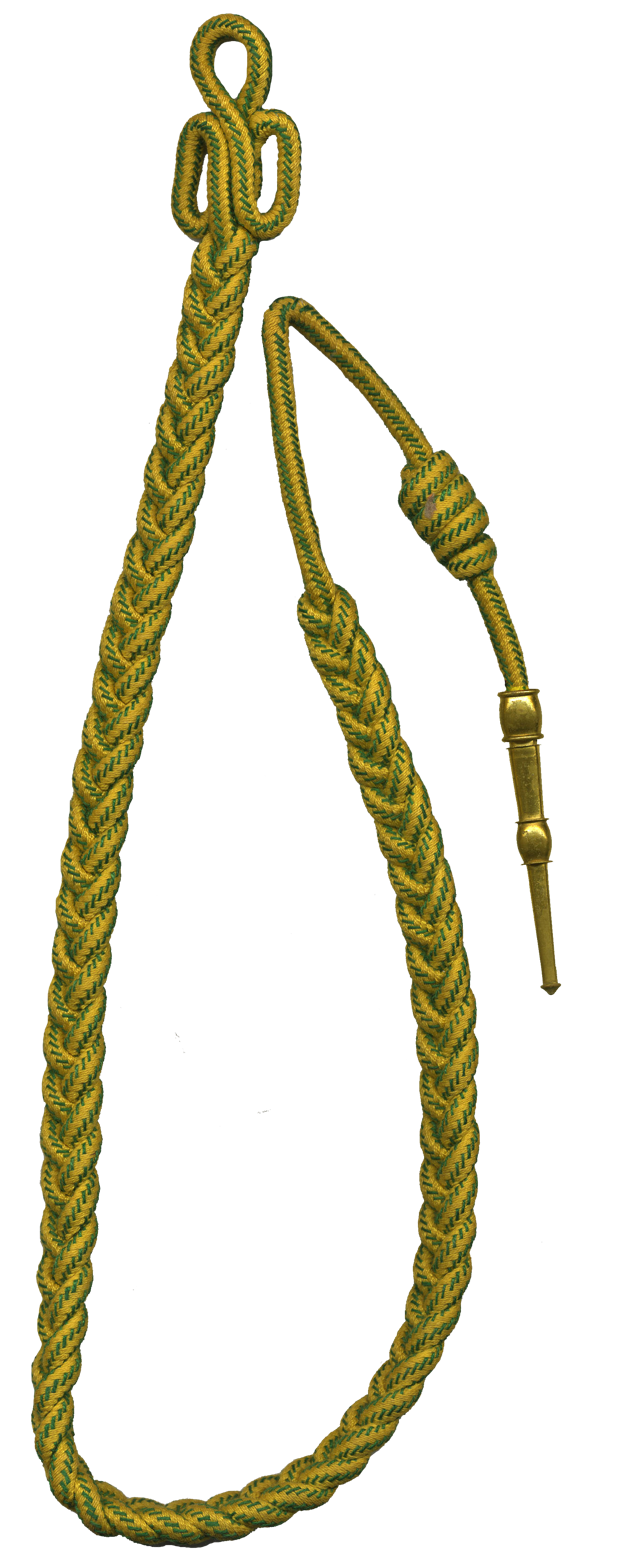
- Médaille militaire : 1er BILA
- Croix de guerre 14-18 : 2e BILA
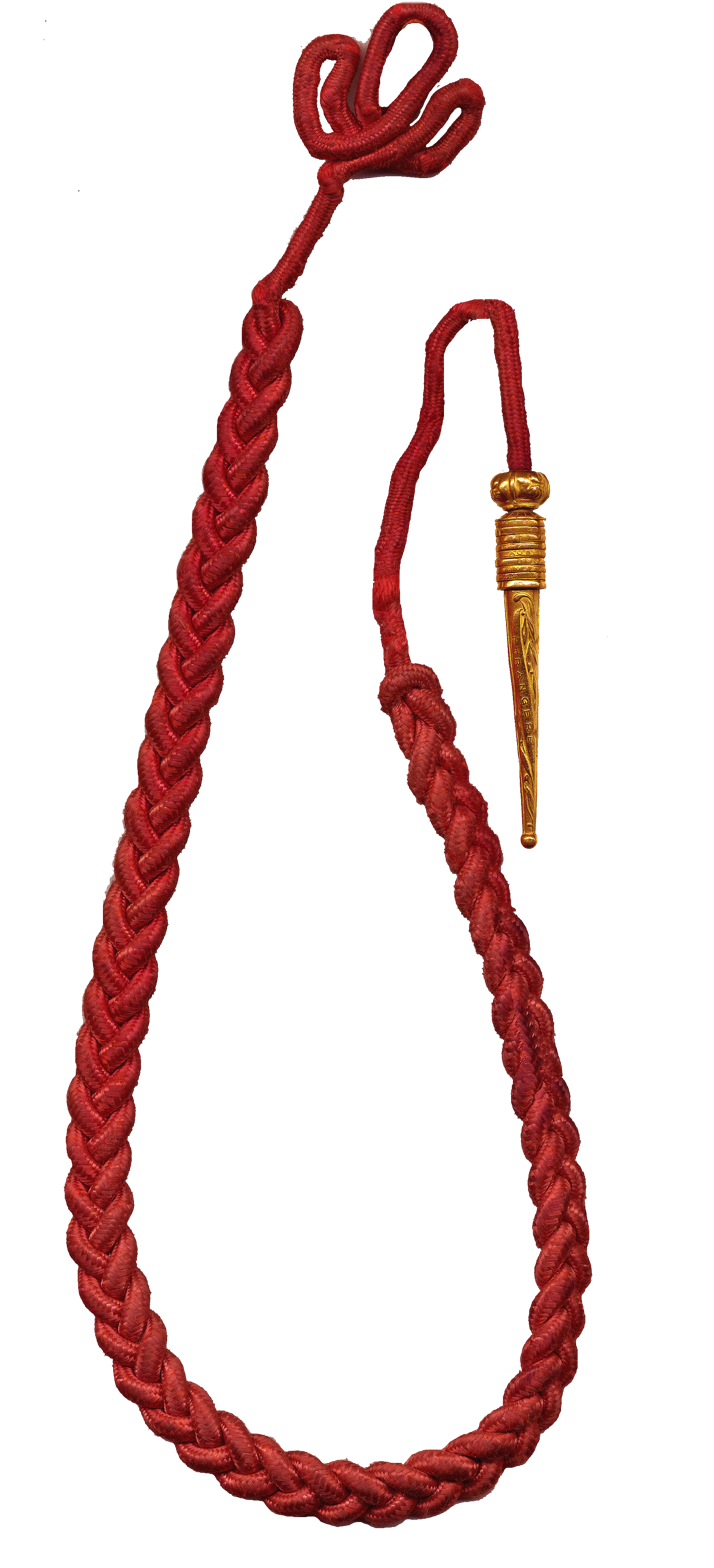
- Légion d'honneur : 3e BMILA

== Battle honours ==
After 1952 (see above) the Regimental flag of the Bat' d'Af' were embroidered those battle honours :

- Mazagran 1840
- Maison du Passeur 1914
- Verdun 1916
- Reims 1918
- La Suippe 1918

== Cadres (NCOs and officers) ==
The difficult task of obtaining sufficient non-commissioned officers for the Bat' d'Af' was resolved by creating two categories of sous-officiers. The cadres blancs ("white cadres"), like the officers, were professional soldiers who served a term with the BILA before continuing their careers with other regiments. The cadres noirs ("black cadres") were former bataillonnaires who chose to remain with the Bat' d'Af' on promotion, after finishing their original terms of service.

== Disciplinary companies ==
The Bat' d'Af' should not be confused with the compagnies d'exclus ("companies of the excluded" i.e. thieves) of the French Army, which were stationed at Aîn-Sefra in Southern Algeria. These penal units consisted of military convicts condemned to five years or more hard labour and were judged unworthy to carry weapons. By contrast the BILA, while strictly disciplined, were considered as armed and serving soldiers with a generally good combat record.

Upon completion of their sentences the convicts of the disciplinary companies might however be required to complete their military service in the Bat' d'Af'.

== See also ==
- Aernoult–Rousset affair
- Bataillon d'Infanterie légère d'Outre-Mer

== Bibliography ==
- Anthony Clayton, 'France, Soldiers, and Africa', Brassey's Defence Publishers, 1988
- Pierre Dufour, 'Les Bat' d'Af' : les Zéphyrs et les Joyeux (1831–1972)', Pygmalion, 2004 (FR)
- Jouineau, André (2009a) [2008]. Officiers et soldats de l'armée française Tome 1 : 1914 [Officers and Soldiers of the French Army Volume I: 1914]. Officers and Soldiers #11. Translated by McKay, Alan. Paris: Histoire & Collections. ISBN 978-2-35250-104-6.
- Jouineau, André (2009b) [2009]. Officiers et soldats de l'armée française Tome 2 : 1915-1918 [Officers and Soldiers of the French Army Volume II: 1915-18]. Officers and Soldiers #12. Translated by McKay, Alan. Paris: Histoire & Collections. ISBN 978-2-35250-105-3.
- Dominique Kalifa, 'Biribi. Les bagnes coloniaux de l'armée française', Paris, Perrin, 2009, 344 p. ISBN 978-2-262-02384-3 (FR)
