= Albert Aernoult =

Unjustly punished French prisoner

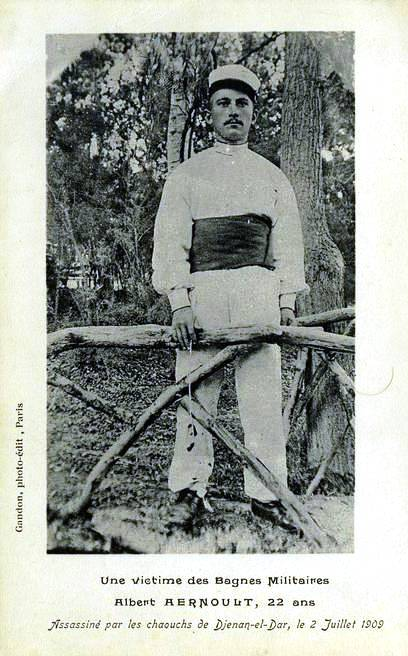
- Postcard of Albert Aernoult published after his death,
- Born: 19 October 1886; Romainville, Seine, France
- Died: 2 July 1909 (aged 22); Djenan ed-Dar, Béni Ounif District, Algeria
- Occupations: Ditch digger, soldier
- Known for: Death in military prison

Albert Aernoult (19 October 1886 – 2 July 1909) was a French ditch digger. He joined the army at the age of twenty, and after serving for two years was sentenced to a few days in prison for a minor offence. He was given brutal punishment and died as a result. A fellow-prisoner reported the incident to the press and was sentenced to five years in prison, ostensibly for a different offense. There was a public outcry, and Aernoult was eventually reburied in Paris in a funeral attended by more than 100,000 people.

== Life ==
Albert Aernoult was born on 19 October 1886 in Romainville, Seine, son of a laborer. He became a ditch digger. He was a trade union activist, and played a major role in the strike of metro workers at the end of 1905. He was denounced as one of the activists. To escape prosecution he left Romainville and found work in the mines of Courrières, Pas-de-Calais. He was sentenced in absentia to two years in prison for his strike action. On returning to Romainville he was arrested and completed his sentence, which was reduced to ten months in the Petite Roquette prison. Aernoult was released in 1907. On 26 March 1907 he signed up with the army for three years. It seems that he was told that his police record would be wiped out if he enrolled. He was posted to an African battalion, and soon began getting into trouble. On 1 July 1909 he was sent to the disciplinary camp at Djenan ed-Dar in the Béni Ounif District of Algeria.

== Death ==
Early in the morning of 2 July 1909 Aernoult was put to work moving wheelbarrow loads of sand. He was forced to move at the double in the desert heat, and after a while refused to do any more. The details of what happened next are unclear, but it seems that he may have been caned, and then was taken to his cell and tied with belts. He may have again been beaten. He agreed to resume work, and continued until the mid-morning meal. After a break he again started work, but eventually collapsed. It was reported that two sergeants thought he was faking exhaustion and started to kick him. He was then taken to another cell, where he may have again been belted and beaten. He was found dead around 8:30 p.m. The cause of death was given as a stroke caused by heat and effort.

== Aftermath ==
Aernoult funerals in 1912

Émile Rousset, who had been a companion of Aernoult at the disciplinary camp, wrote a letter to the newspaper Le Matin describing what he had witnessed. (Note: Rousset was often in trouble. He had been jailed four times for robbery before joining the army in January 1908, and ten disciplinary actions had been taken against him by the time of the incident. He was charged with murder for the stabbing of another soldier on 27 August 1911. He was cleared of the charges on 24 September 1912.) According to Rousset one of the sergeants involved in Aernoult's death threatened to force him to "walk down the same road as Aernoult", which he took to be a death threat. Rousset refused work on 18 July 1909 so he would be charged for trial by a conseil de guerre, and would be protected while waiting trial. A sergeant reported that Rousset had abused him after being put in his cell, and this charge was added to the charge of refusing work. On 19 January 1910 Rousset was found guilty of both charges and on 2 February 1910 he was sentenced to five years hard labor.

A committee to release Rousset was organized that included anarchists, the socialist journals l'Humanité and la Guerre sociale, the unions, the Committee for Social Defense (Comité de Défense Sociale) and the League for the Rights of Man (Ligue des Droits de l'Homme). On 22 March 1910 the Committee for Social Defense published a poster A bas Biribi! (Note: In the French army "to be sent to Biribi" was slang for being sent to the disciplinary battalions in Algeria.) signed by trade union activists, revolutionary socialists and libertarians. The signatories were prosecuted in the criminal court, but were acquitted. They used the trial as a public stage to parade witnesses who testified to the brutality and injustice of the military system. Gaston Couté published the song Gloire à Rousset on 28 December 1910. On 11 February 1912 Aernoult's body, repatriated by a public subscription organized by L'Humanité, was taken to the columbarium of Père Lachaise Cemetery in Paris. L'Humanité had promoted Aernoult to the status of a martyr. It was reported that over 100,000 people attended his funeral. Rousset was not released until eight months later.

== Sources ==
- Cerullo, John (Summer 2008). "The Aernoult-Rousset Affair: Military Justice on Trial in Belle Époque France". Historical Reflections / Réflexions Historiques. 34 (2, Beyond Left and Right: New Perspectives on the Politics of the Third Republic). Berghahn Books: 4–24. JSTOR 23232708.
- Chisholm, Hugh, ed. (1911). "Biribi" . Encyclopædia Britannica. Vol. 3 (11th ed.). Cambridge University Press. p. 980.
- R.D. (2007-03-25). "AERNOULT Albert, Louis". Dictionnaire international des militants anarchistes.
- Weber, Eugen (1959). The Nationalist Revival in France, 1905-1914. University of California Press. GGKEY:NPPXJCEP16Z.
