= Biribi =

Game of chance

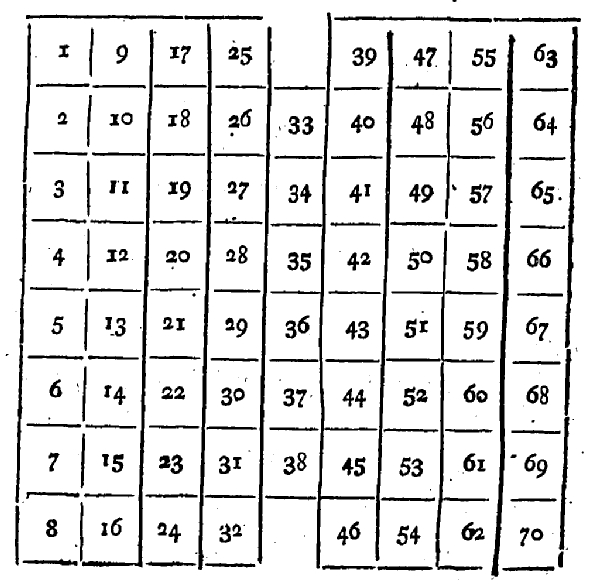
Tableau for Biribi (1788)

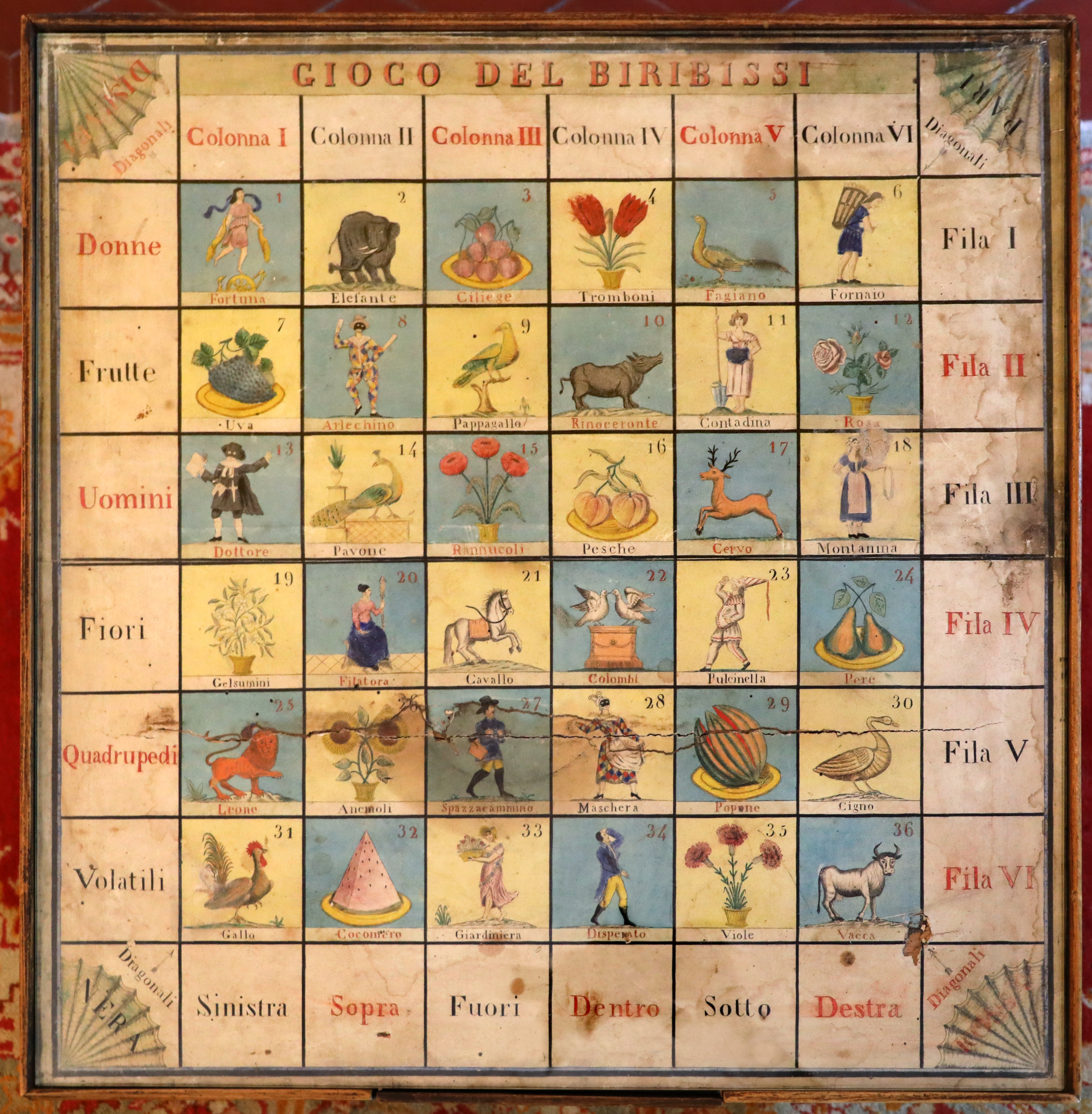
Richly illustrated historical Biribi board from the 18th century

Biribi, biribissi (in Italian), or cavagnole (in French), is an Italian game of chance similar to keno, played for low stakes. It is played on a board on which the numbers 1 to 70 are marked. The game has been banned in France since 1837.

The players put their stakes on the numbers they wish to back. The banker is provided with a bag from which he draws a case containing a ticket, the tickets corresponding with the numbers on the board. The banker calls out the number, and any players who backed it receive sixty-four times their stake; all other stakes go to the banker.

Casanova played it in Genoa (illegally, for it was already banned there) and the South of France in the 1760s, and describes it as "a regular cheats' game". He broke the bank (fairly, he claims) and was immediately rumored to have been in collusion with the bag-holder; such collusion, presumably, was common.

In the French army, "to be sent to Biribi" was a cant term for being sent to the disciplinary battalions in Algeria.
