= Émile Aubin =

French anarcho-syndicalist (1866–1949)

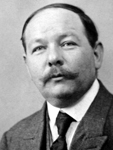
- Born: March 8, 1886; Paris
- Died: August 5, 1949 (aged 63); Drancy, France

Émile Aubin (1866–1949) was a French anarcho-syndicalist, antimilitarist, and chansonnier, active during the early 20th century. Born in Paris, Aubin became a prominent figure in the French anarchist movement, known for his vocal opposition to militarism and his involvement in labor activism.
