= Battle of Hollabrunn (1809) =

1809 combat during the War of the Fifth Coalition

- Part of the War of the Fifth Coalition
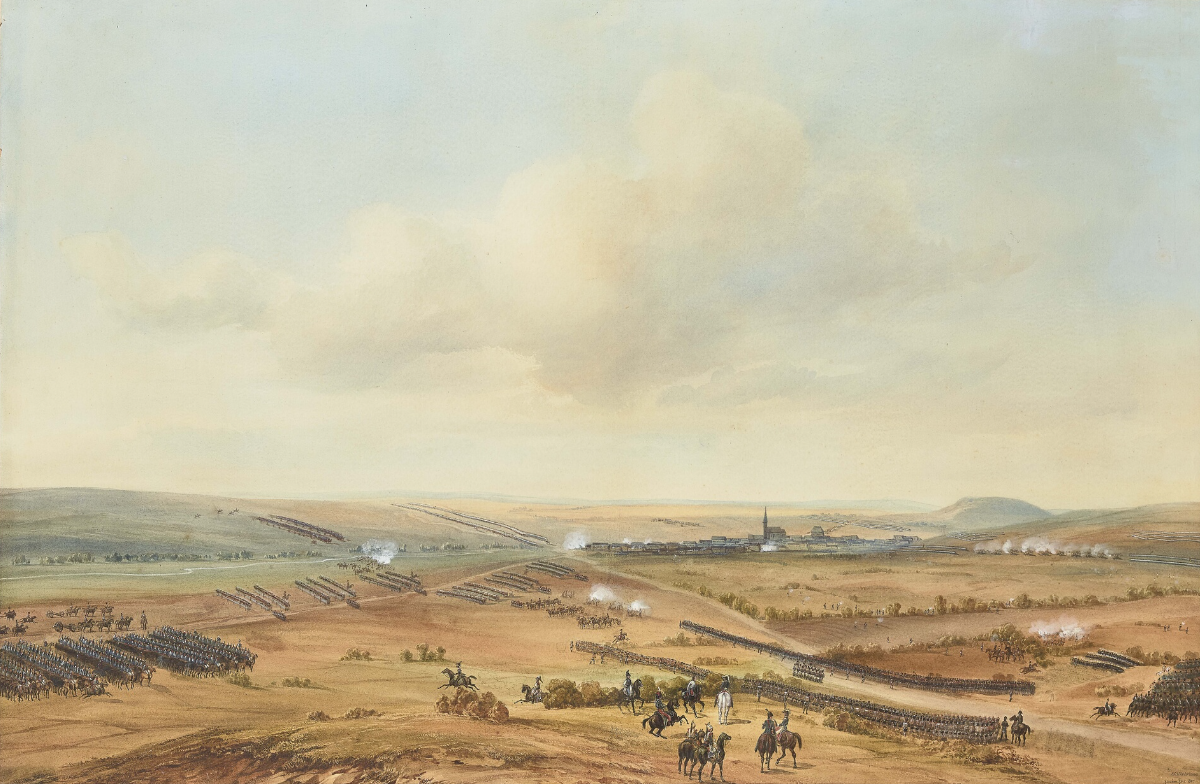
- Battle of Hollabrunn by Siméon Fort, 1837
Date	9 July 1809
Location	Hollabrunn, present-day Austria, then Austrian Empire 48°34′N 16°6′E
Result	Austrian victory

Belligerents
(France) French Empire	Austrian Empire

Commanders and leaders
(France) André Masséna	(Austrian Empire) Johann von Klenau

Strength
11,000	17,000

Casualties and losses
Over 320	1,200

War of the Fifth Coalition
current battle
Napoleon in command
Napoleon not in command

The Battle of Hollabrunn was a rearguard action fought on 9 July 1809 by Austrian VI Korps of the Kaiserlich-königliche Hauptarmee under Johann von Klenau against elements of the French IV Corps of the Armée d'Allemagne, under the command of André Masséna.

The battle ended in favour of the Austrians, with Masséna forced to break off the combat and wait for his remaining divisions to reinforce him, but the French Marshal was able to gather crucial intelligence about the intentions of his enemy.

== Context and battle ==
The French victory at the Battle of Wagram on 6 July forced the commander of the Kaiserlich-königliche Hauptarmee, the main Austrian army, Archduke Charles of Austria-Teschen, to retreat. In spite of the defeat, the retreat was orderly and very well handled. The French, commanded by Napoleon I, were initially unsure about the exact direction, with reports saying that the Austrians were retreating towards Bohemia, but it was still unclear whether they would retreat using the road to Brünn or the road to Znaim. Other reports from, sent by General Louis-Pierre Montbrun were indicating that the Austrians were actually retreating towards Moravia. Masséna sent scouts towards Krems and the district of Horn and was able to ascertain that the enemy was not retreating in that direction, but he was unable to conclude where they would retreat. It thus took the French a few days after the battle of Wagram, before they could gather enough intelligence to really understand where the Austrians were going. However, by 8 July, things began to clarify for Napoleon, mainly due to intelligence sent by Auguste de Marmont, commander of XI Corps and the significance of a series of combats fought by elements of Masséna's Corps against the VI Korps under Klenau. These combats, fought at Korneuburg and Stockerau allowed Masséna to inform Napoleon that a large Austrian force was indeed retreating towards Bohemia.

Austrian commander Klenau, with an initial force of 18,000 men and 64 cannons had orders to delay the French pursuit. On 9 July, Klenau decided to make another stand, this time near Hollabrunn, around 55 kilometers northwest of Vienna. Following the initial skirmishes, Klenau's force was still 17,000 men strong and it now occupied a strong position. Opposite to him, Masséna only had under his immediate control General Claude Legrand's 1st division of IV Corps, the Corps cavalry under General Jacob François Marulaz and the cuirassiers from the 2nd heavy cavalry division of General Raymond-Gaspard de Bonardi de Saint-Sulpice. Masséna promptly engaged Klenau, while at the same time conducting a full reconnaissance of the battlefield, which enabled him to write to the Emperor and reconfirm that no Austrian regiments were heading towards Krems. Masséna's attacks were at first successful, but Klenau counterattacked and repulsed the French and then opposed staunch resistance to any further attacks. The outnumbered Masséna was forced to break off the combat and wait for his other three infantry divisions, knowing that Claude Carra Saint-Cyr's division would be able to rejoin him shortly, but that Gabriel Jean Joseph Molitor's and Jean Boudet's were much too far off to be of any assistance.

== Aftermath ==
Battle losses are unknown and, although an Austrian victory, the battle of Hollabrunn did allow Masséna to write to Napoleon and report that he was on the right track following the Austrians, whose main body was retreating along the river Thaya near Laa an der Thaya. Johann von Klenau would later be awarded the Military Order of Maria Theresa for his actions at the battle of Wagram and gallant rearguard actions after that battle. Meanwhile, Archduke Charles of Austria-Teschen regrouped a large force at Jetzelsdorf, on the Pulkau river, but he later evacuated this position, after receiving intelligence that a French force was approaching Znaim from the east. The next major combat would be the one at Znaim, where the Austrians demanded an armistice.

== Notes ==
Preceded by Battle of Gefrees	Napoleonic Wars; Battle of Hollabrunn (1809)	Succeeded by Combat of Schöngrabern
