= Combat of Schöngrabern =

1809 combat during the War of the Fifth Coalition

- Part of the War of the Fifth Coalition
Date	10 July 1809
Location	Hollabrunn, present-day Austria, then Austrian Empire 48°34′N 16°6′E
Result	French victory

Belligerents
(France) French Empire	Austrian Empire

Commanders and leaders
(France) Claude Legrand	(Austrian Empire) Prince Heinrich XV of Reuss-Plauen

Strength
11,000 men 24 cannons	27,000 men (6,000 engaged); 32 cannons

Casualties and losses
Unknown	Unknown

War of the Fifth Coalition
current battle
Napoleon in command
Napoleon not in command

The Combat of Schöngrabern was a relatively minor rearguard action fought by Austrian V Korps and supporting elements of the Kaiserlich-königliche Hauptarmee under Prince Heinrich XV of Reuss-Plauen against elements of the French IV Corps of the Armée d'Allemagne, under the command of Claude Legrand.

The brief combat ended in favour of the French but Reuss did manage to delay the French sufficiently in order to prevent them from getting to the battle of Znaim on 10 July.

== Context ==
Following Johann von Klenau's successful Austrian rearguard action at Hollabrunn the day before, Austrian Prince Reuss, commander of V Korps, to which several additional units were attached for a total of 27,000 men and 32 cannons, took position near Schöngrabern. Reuss's orders were to form a rearguard and delay the enemy before him, preventing them from arriving at Znaim, where the main Austrian force was massed and combat was set to begin. Opposite to Reuss lay the vanguard of the Marshal André Masséna's IV Corps, under the overall command of General Legrand. Legrand's command was 11,000 men and 24 cannons strong and included the 1st division of IV Corps and the Corps cavalry. Masséna's orders were to push on towards Haugsdorf and then head to Znaim where General Auguste de Marmont's XI Corps had made contact with the enemy's main force.

== Battle ==
Masséna sent his cavalry, as well as Legrand's and Claude Carra Saint-Cyr's infantry divisions towards Haugsdorf, while leaving Jean Boudet's division at Stockerau and Gabriel Jean Joseph Molitor's division in between. Executing his orders, Legrand moved forward but, towards 09:00, encountered staunch opposition towards Schöngrabern, a village in front of which Reuss had left a rearguard of 6,000. It took Legrand some time before he was able to take the position, with the Austrians leading a superb fighting retreat. Losses following this battle are unknown but it is clear that Masséna's march to Znaim had been delayed, as towards 20:00, he had to stop at Jetzlsdorf, with the divisions of Legrand, Carra Saint-Cyr and his cavalry after these troops had been fighting and then marching all day. The delaying action at Schöngrabern meant that Masséna was only able to arrive to the battle of Znaim on 11 July. However, Reuss also had difficulties in containing Masséna and was himself only able to arrive at Znaim late on the evening of 10 July. Masséna and Reuss would face each other again on 11 July, at the battle of Znaim.

== Notes ==
Preceded by Battle of Hollabrunn (1809)	Napoleonic Wars; Combat of Schöngrabern	Succeeded by Armistice of Znaim
