= Battle of Hollabrunn =

The Battle of Hollabrunn may refer to:

- Battle of Schöngrabern, 1805, between a French force under Joachim Murat and a Russian Corps under Pyotr Bagration
- Battle of Hollabrunn (1809), between a French force under André Masséna and an Austrian Corps under Johann von Klenau
