= Combat of Korneuburg =

1809 combat during the War of the Fifth Coalition

- Part of the War of the Fifth Coalition
Date	7 July 1809
Location	Korneuburg, present-day Austria, then Austrian Empire 48°20′43″N 16°19′59″E
Result	French victory

Belligerents
(France) French Empire	Austrian Empire

Commanders and leaders
(France) Claude Legrand	(Austrian Empire) Johann von Klenau

Units involved
(France) IV Corps	

Strength
13,000; 24 cannons	18,000; 64 cannons

Casualties and losses
350	400; 300 captured

War of the Fifth Coalition
current battle
Napoleon in command
Napoleon not in command

The Combat of Korneuburg was a relatively minor rearguard action fought by Austrian VI Korps of the Kaiserlich-königliche Hauptarmee under Johann von Klenau against elements of the French IV Corps of the Armée d'Allemagne, under the command of Claude Legrand. The brief combat ended in favour of the French.

== Context ==
Following the French victory at the battle of Wagram the day before, the commander of the Kaiserlich-königliche Hauptarmee, the main Austrian army, Archduke Charles of Austria-Teschen, organised an orderly retreat towards Bohemia. Archduke Charles detailed Klenau, with 18,000 men and 64 cannons to delay the French pursuit, which was spearheaded in this sector by the French IV Corps of Marshal André Masséna. Masséna had formed a vanguard under the overall command of General Legrand, whose command (13,000 men and 24 cannons) included Legrand's own 1st division of IV Corps, the Corps cavalry under General Jacob François Marulaz and the cuirassiers from the 2nd heavy cavalry division of General Raymond-Gaspard de Bonardi de Saint-Sulpice.

== Battle ==
These forces made contact with the Austrian Corps on 7 July near Korneuburg, around 19 kilometers northwest of Vienna. After a brief engagement, the French broke through and Klenau promptly retreated. The French had around 350 men killed or wounded, while the total Austrian losses are unknown, but included 300 prisoners of war.

== Notes ==
Preceded by Battle of Wagram	Napoleonic Wars; Combat of Korneuburg	Succeeded by Combat of Stockerau
