= Combat of Stockerau =

1809 combat during the War of the Fifth Coalition

- Part of the War of the Fifth Coalition
Date	8 July 1809
Location	Stockerau, present-day Austria, then Austrian Empire 48°23′N 16°13′E
Result	Austrian victory

Belligerents
(First French Empire) French Empire; Grand Duchy of Hesse	Austrian Empire

Commanders and leaders
(First French Empire) Jacob Marulaz	(Austrian Empire) Ludwig Wallmoden

Strength
150 cavalrymen	Around 1,200 men

Casualties and losses
Most troops engaged	Light

War of the Fifth Coalition
current battle
Napoleon in command
Napoleon not in command

The Combat of Stockerau was a minor rearguard cavalry skirmish fought by elements of the cavalry of Austrian VI Korps of the Kaiserlich-königliche Hauptarmee under Ludwig von Wallmoden-Gimborn against a single Hessian Guard Chevauleger regiment, under the command of French General Jacob François Marulaz. The combat ended in favour of the Austrians.

== Context ==
Following the French victory at the battle of Wagram two days before, the French IV Corps of the Armée d'Allemagne, under Marshal André Masséna was pursuing Johann von Klenau's VI Korps of the Kaiserlich-königliche Hauptarmee Hauptarmee. After a successful skirmish at Korneuburg on 7 July, Masséna was aware that the enemy was retreating towards Bohemia and continued his pursuit in that direction. Leading Masséna's Corps cavalry was General Marulaz, who led the way, at the head of the Hessian Garde-Chevauleger regiment, a total of three squadrons, with a complement of 150 men.

== Battle ==
Arriving with these men at Stockerau, around 43 kilometers from Vienna, on 8 July, Marulaz was attacked by the Austrian hussars of Austrian VI Korps. At the battle of Wagram, Wallmoden's command included around 1,365 cavalrymen from the 7th Liechtenstein (8 squadrons, 712 men) and 8th Kienmayer Hussars (8 squadrons 563 men), but it is unclear how many of these men Wallmoden actually engaged at Stockerau. It is certain, however, that, following a brief series of cavalry engagements, the troops of Marulaz were broken, dispersed and the regiment was almost destroyed.

French military historian Alain Pigeard qualifies the cavalry combat at Stockerau as a "bloody setback" for the French under Marulaz.

== Notes ==
Preceded by Combat of Korneuburg	Napoleonic Wars; Combat of Stockerau	Succeeded by Battle of Gefrees
