= Siege of Besançon (1814) =

Siege during the War of the Sixth Coalition

- Part of the War of the Sixth Coalition
Date	1 January – 2 May 1814
Location	Besançon, France
Result	Allied victory

Belligerents
Austria	France

Commanders and leaders
(Austrian Empire) Alois of Liechtenstein	(First French Empire) Jacob François Marulaz (First French Empire) Gabriel Laffaille

Casualties and losses
Unknown	242 killed >500 wounded 80 captured

The siege of Besançon was an event during the War of the Sixth Coalition, which occurred in 1814 in Besançon (Franche-Comté), France. The First French Empire, commanded by Napoleon I, engaged in battles with a number of European powers in the early 1800s.

== Battle ==
On 1 January 1814, the defence of Besançon was entrusted to General Jacob François Marulaz (1769–1842) who led the 6th division against the Austrians at Bregille and the Chaprais and the Liechtensteiners at Planoise. The besiegers surrounded the city on all sides by taking up positions at the chapel of Notre-Dame des Buis, Fontain, Beure, Velotte, Avanne, Saint-Ferjeux, Tilleroyes, Palante, and Chalezeule. Besançon was declared under siege on 9 January and was blockaded by an army of 15,000 Austrians the next day. General Marulaz, with the support of Commander Gabriel Laffaille, ordered the destruction of all buildings and other infrastructure within a radius of 700 metres around the city and within the city walls, in order to prevent the enemy from having supplies and shelter for their army. The houses of Canot were set on fire on 10 January 1814 and those of Bregille and the Chaprais on the following days, leading to rampant protests, particularly in the direction of Laffaille. Marulaz was bribed, betrayed by an officer in his entourage, and was restrictions were imposed upon him.

The entire month of January was spent fighting skirmishes for outposts which led to an intense fight on the 31st, in which the Austrians lost many troops. Soon after this fight, a thick fog covered the city and its surroundings for several days, covering the positions of the besiegers. On 15 February, the mist lifted and the attacks began again. On 31 March, one of the most important battles of this siege took place. The inhabitants of Besançon, together with the soldiers of the French army, remained for six hours under attack from the enemy, but they repulsed the Austrians with a cost of 122 dead, 300 wounded, and 80 prisoners. The next day, the fighting continued for four hours, with almost the same result of 120 dead and more than 200 wounded.

The siege was lifted on 2 May 1814, although Napoleon had abdicated on 6 April, an armistice was signed on 19 April and the Prince of Liechtenstein entered into the city on 24 April. This episode marked a turning point for the fortified city of Besançon, as its defences were then reworked, particularly at the sites of Beauregard, Bregille, Chaudanne, Trois-Châtels and Tousey. The city was left in ruins from this siege and it took about twenty years to recover from its after-effects, thus falling behind in its future development.
