= Hollabrunn =

- Municipality
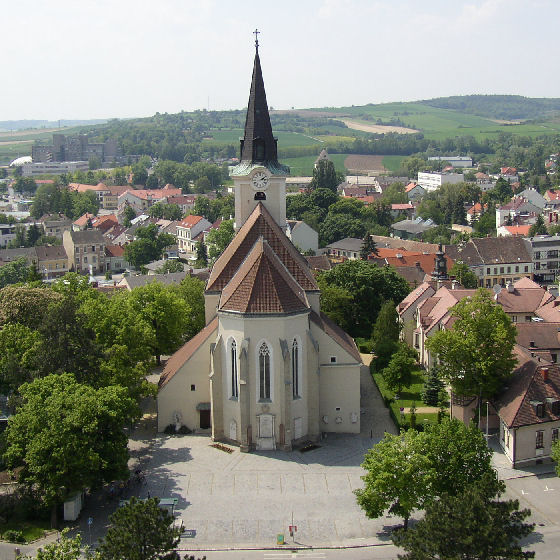
- The parish church of Hollabrunn

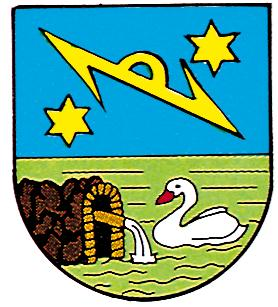
- Coat of arms

- Location within Austria
- Coordinates: 48°34′N 16°6′E
- Country: Austria
- State: Lower Austria
- District: Hollabrunn

Government
  - Mayor: Alfred Babinsky (ÖVP)

Area
  - Total: 152.37 km^{2} (58.83 sq mi)
- Elevation: 236 m (774 ft)

Population (2018-01-01)
  - Total: 11,681
  - Density: 76.662/km^{2} (198.55/sq mi)
- Time zone: UTC+1 (CET)
  - Summer (DST): UTC+2 (CEST)
- Postal code: 2020
- Area code: 02952
- Website: www.hollabrunn.gv.at

Hollabrunn (German pronunciation: [hɔlaˈbʁʊn]) is a district capital town in the Austrian state of Lower Austria, on the Göllersbach river. It is situated in the heart of the biggest wine region of Austria, the Weinviertel.

== History ==
The surroundings of Hollabrunn were first settled in Neolithic times. Around 300 B.C. one of the most significant La Tène culture cities in central Europe briefly flourished on the southern slopes of the Sandberg hill at Roseldorf close to the village of Platt, a few kilometers to the northwest of Hollabrunn.

During the War of the Third Coalition, the nearby town of Schöngrabern on 16 November 1805 was the site of a battle between the French Napoleonic troops under Joachim Murat (including general Nicolas Oudinot, who was wounded) and the Russian general Pyotr Bagration (who was protecting Kutuzov's retreat north towards Austerlitz).

Almost four years later during the War of the Fifth Coalition, the town once more saw two battles between French and Austrian troops. The Battle of Hollabrunn was a rearguard action fought after the battle of Wagram on 9 July 1809 by the Austrian VI Korps under Johann von Klenau against elements of the French IV Corps, under the command of André Masséna. The next day the rearguard combat resumed at Schöngrabern.

== Notable people ==
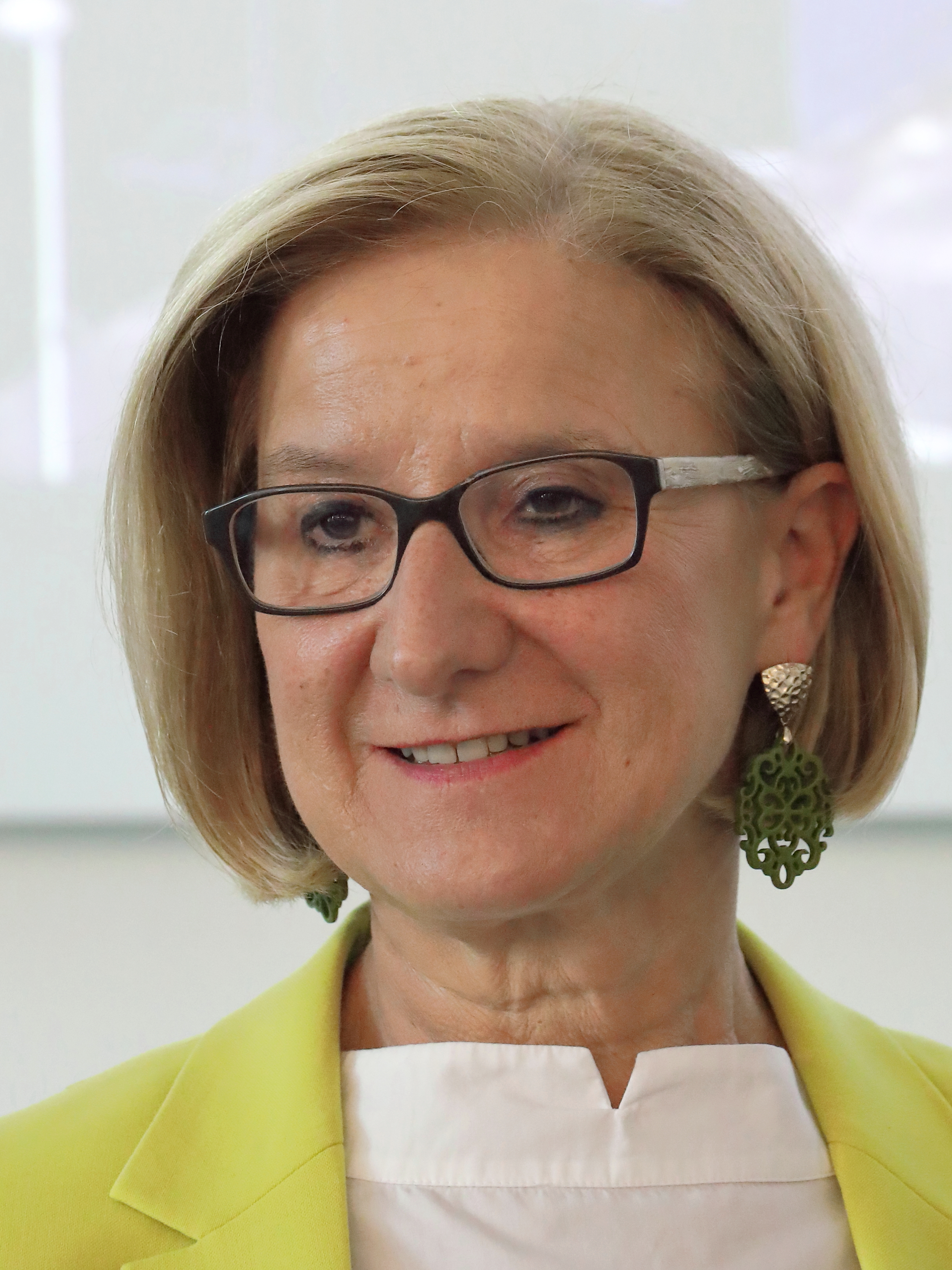
Johanna Mikl-Leitner, 2023

- Felix von Luschan (1854–1924), medical doctor, anthropologist, explorer, archaeologist and ethnographer
- Karl Anton Nowotny (1904-1978), ethnographer, art historian and academic specialising in Mesoamerica
- Hans Hermann Groër (1919–2003), Austrian Cardinal (Catholic Church); Archbishop of Vienna, 1986 to 1995
- Christine Mannhalter (born 1948) an Austrian molecular biologist and hematologist
- Regina Fritsch (born 1964), an Austrian actress; member of the Burgtheater ensemble
- Johanna Mikl-Leitner (born 1964), an Austrian politician (ÖVP); the governor of Lower Austria since 2017
- Philipp Fleischmann, (DE Wiki) (born 1985) actor and director
- Markus Suttner (born 1987), a retired Austrian footballer who played over 330 games and 20 for Austria

== Sources and references ==
- Nouveau Larousse illustré, undated, early 20th century, in French
