= Christine Mannhalter =

Austrian university professor, hematologist and molecular biologist

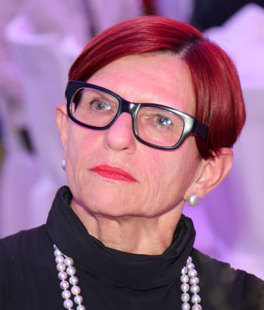
- Mannhalter at the 2014 Wittgenstein-Preis
- Born: November 9, 1948
- Scientific career
- Fields: Molecular biology, hematology
- Institutions: Medical University of Vienna

Christine Mannhalter is an Austrian molecular biologist and hematologist who is a Professor of Molecular Diagnostics at the Medical University of Vienna. She has been a vice-president at the Austrian Science Fund since 2010 and took over its interim presidency in 2015.

== Early life and education ==
Mannhalter was born in Hollabrunn, Austria on November 9, 1948. She studied biotechnology as an undergraduate and received her PhD from the University of Vienna Medical School (now the Medical University of Vienna) in 1977. She was a postdoctoral fellow with Sandra Schiffman at the University of Southern California Medical School from 1977 to 1979.

== Academic career ==
Mannhalter has spent her academic career at the Medical University of Vienna, beginning as a research assistant, advancing to an associate professorship in 1985, and becoming a full professor of Molecular Diagnostics in Clinical Chemistry in 2000. Between 2003 and 2007 she served as the chair of the Society of Thrombosis and Haemostasis (GTH), a scientific society serving primarily scientists in Germany, Austria, and Switzerland. She has also served as a vice-president at the Austrian Science Fund (FWF) since 2010 and became the interim president in 2015.

== Research ==
Mannhalter's research focuses on the molecular biology and genetics of vascular diseases. Her research group has identified mutations associated with interactions between bacteria and platelets.
