= Gefrees =

- Town
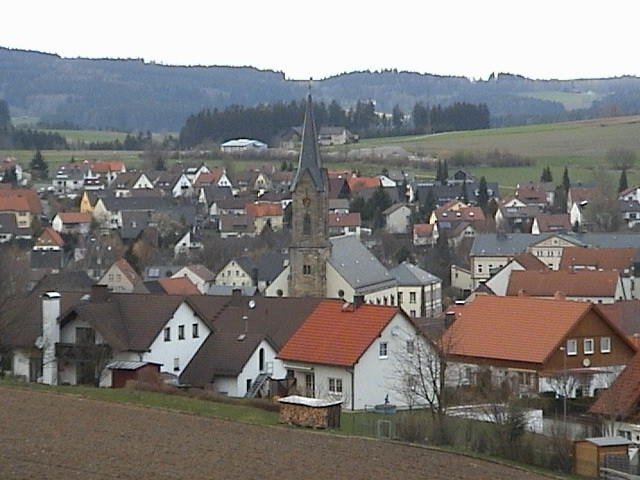
- Gefrees seen from the southeast

- Coat of arms

- Location of Gefrees within Bayreuth district
- Interactive map of Gefrees
- Location within Germany Location within Bavaria
- Coordinates: 50°5′42.50″N 11°44′23.41″E
- Country: Germany
- State: Bavaria
- Admin. region: Oberfranken
- District: Bayreuth
- Subdivisions: 44 Ortsteile

Government
  - Mayor (2020–26): Oliver Dietel

Area
  - Total: 50.32 km^{2} (19.43 sq mi)
- Elevation: 500 m (1,600 ft)

Population (2025-12-31)
  - Total: 4,173
  - Density: 82.93/km^{2} (214.8/sq mi)
- Time zone: UTC+01:00 (CET)
  - Summer (DST): UTC+02:00 (CEST)
- Postal codes: 95482
- Dialling codes: 09254
- Vehicle registration: BT
- Website: www.gefrees.de

Gefrees (German pronunciation: [ɡəˈfʁeːs]) is a town in the district of Bayreuth, in Bavaria, Germany. It is situated in the Fichtel Mountains, 21 km northeast of Bayreuth. It was the site of a battle during the Napoleonic Wars.
