= Claude Juste Alexandre Legrand =

French general (1762–1815)

Claude Juste Alexandre Louis Legrand
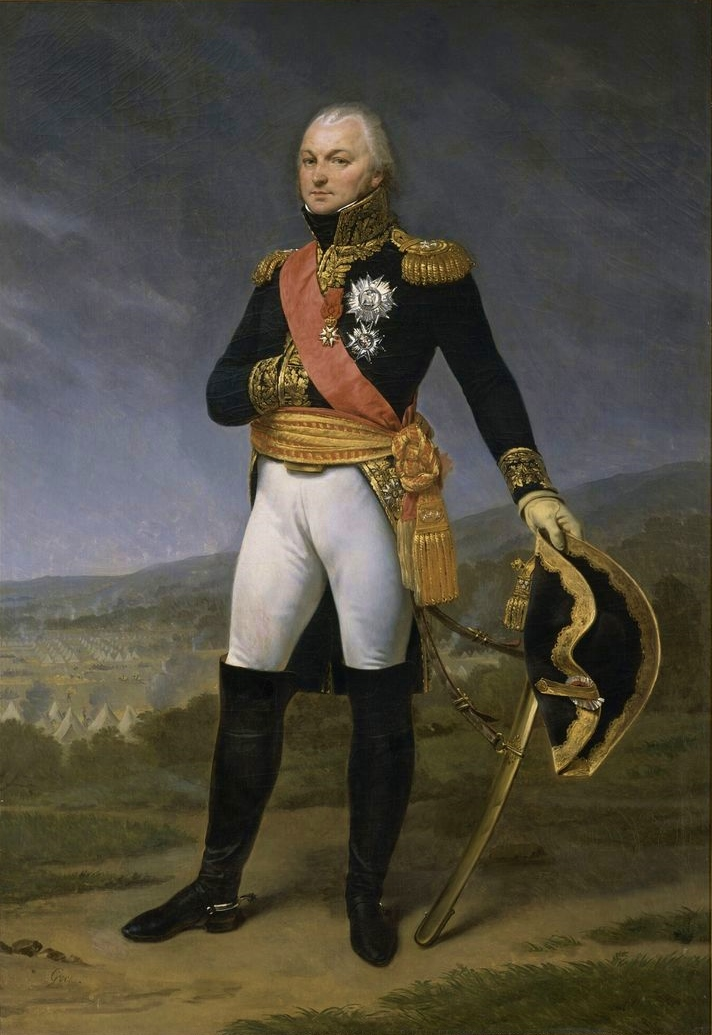
- Portrait by Antoine-Jean Gros, 1812
- Born: 23 February 1762; Le Plessier-sur-Saint-Just, France
- Died: 9 January 1815 (aged 52); Paris, France
- Burial place: Panthéon, Paris
- Military career
- Allegiance: First French Empire
- Branch: French Army
- Service years: 1777–1815
- Rank: général de division
- Conflicts: French Revolutionary Wars; Napoleonic Wars; Battle of Austerlitz; Combat of Korneuburg; Combat of Schöngrabern
- Awards: Grand Eagle / Grand Cross of the Légion d'honneur, name inscribed on the Arc de Triomphe (east side)

Claude Juste Alexandre Louis Legrand (French pronunciation: [klod ʒyst alɛksɑ̃dʁ lwi ləɡʁɑ̃]; 23 February 1762, Le Plessier-sur-Saint-Just, Oise – 9 January 1815, Paris) was a French general. He commanded French divisions at several notable battles of the French Revolutionary and Napoleonic Wars, including Austerlitz, where his division, as part of the IV Corps, repelled a huge Coalition, mainly Russian, onslaught. Napoléon made him a Count of the Empire in 1808. He rose to senator on 5 April 1813, then Pair de France on 4 June 1814 and chevalier de Saint-Louis on 27 June 1814. He organised the defence of Chalon-sur-Saône in 1814 and died in Paris in 1815 of wounds received beside the River Berezina.

== Life ==
=== Revolution and Republic ===
His military career started when he enlisted in 1777. During the French Revolution he rose rapidly in rank to lieutenant colonel. He received promotion to général de brigade in 1793 and fought at the Battle of Fleurus (1794). As part of the Army of the Danube, he also fought at the Battle of Ostrach and the Battle of Stockach (1799). As a général de division he fought under Jean Victor Marie Moreau at the Battle of Hohenlinden (1800), successfully holding the left flank.

=== Empire ===
Under Emperor Napoleon, he commanded a division in Marshal Nicolas Soult's IV Corps in the 1805 campaign. At the Battle of Austerlitz, his division helped to fend off the massive Austro-Russian left wing long enough for Soult's other two divisions to break through the Russian center.

Still in the corps of Soult, Legrand fought at the battles of Jena in 1806 and Eylau in 1807. During the 1809 campaign, he led a division under Marshal Andre Massena in the battles of Ebelsberg, Aspern-Essling and Wagram. In Napoleon's 1812 invasion of Russia, he fought in Marshal Oudinot's II Corps at Polotsk. He was badly wounded during the crossing of the Berezina River but survived the disastrous winter retreat.

Legrand was employed in minor commands during the 1814 campaign in France. He died from the effects of his Russian wound on 9 January 1815.

== Bibliography ==
- Arnold, James, Marengo & Hohenlinden. Pen & Sword, 2005.
- Chandler, David, The Campaigns of Napoleon. Macmillan, 1978.
- Chandler, David, Dictionary of the Napoleonic Wars. Macmillan, 1979.
- Smith, Digby, The Napoleonic Wars Data Book. Greenhill, 1998.
