= Flags of the Austrian Army during the French Revolutionary and Napoleonic Wars =

During the French Revolutionary and Napoleonic Wars, three main patterns of flags were used by the army of the Habsburg monarchy. From 1768 until 1805, each infantry regiment carried two flags per battalion: the 1st or Leib Battalion carried the white Leibfahne and one yellow Ordinarfahne, while the others used two Ordinarfahnen. As the new organisation was implemented under Karl Mack von Leiberich, an Imperial Decree of 22 June 1805 reduced the flags to one per battalion, the Grenadier (or Leib Battalion) carrying the white Leibfahne as it was the senior battalion and the others carrying one Ordinarfahne each. When the army reverted to its former organisation on 6 December 1806, so did the flags, i.e.: Leibfahne plus one Ordinarfahne for 1st (Leib) Battalion, two Ordinarfahnen for the others. A further change in 1808 reduced the numbers of flags to one per battalion again. Grenadier battalions (which only formed up in wartime) carried one Ordinarfahne except in 1805, usually but not necessarily from the senior parent regiment depot. The post-1808 Jäger battalions never carried flags. The Grenzers used the usual system, except that after 1807, all battalions appear to have carried one Ordinarfahne. It is not clear whether they carried the flag in war, although one was captured from 9. Peterwardein Grenzer at the Battle of Eckmühl in April 1809.

== Flag sizes ==
The infantry flags measured 161 x 142 cm with the "flames" each 16 cm wide at the base in red, black, yellow and white, the last two replaced by gold and silver on the Leibfahne throughout the period.

== Ehrenbände ==
The multi-coloured Ehrenbände ribbons, usually presented by the Inhaber, were nailed to the top of the staff and covered by the roundel on the centre of the bow, but were only worn on the flag on ceremonial occasions. However, one captured example at the Musée de l’Empéri in France has an Ehrenbände attached. On a plate in the 'Heer & Tradition' series, the Leibfahne of IR 39 Duka is shown as having white Ehrenbände, edged and fringed in red, on an 1806 pattern flag. On the same plate, IR14 Klebek is shown as having white Ehrenbände, edged and fringed in gold on a 1792 pattern standard. A red Ehrenbände, embroidered in silver, from an 1809 Vienna Volunteer flag, presented by Empress Maria Ludovika, is displayed at the Vienna City Museum.

== 1792 pattern ==
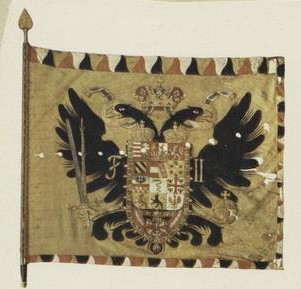
1780 pattern modified to 1792 pattern Ordinarfahne from the New York Public Library Collection

The pattern in service at the start of the wars was the 1780 pattern introduced by Joseph II to reflect his policy of moving away from reliance on the Holy Roman Empire to focusing on Habsburg Lands. The black Doppeladler eagle carried a large shield, which displayed the full Habsburg coat of arms and really expressed his policy of relying on the Austrian resources and no longer those of the Holy Roman Empire. To the sides on the wings were the Imperial Buchstaben (cipher initials), starting with 'JII' for Joseph II, Holy Roman Emperor (1765–1790). Due to the end of the Turkish War and the ongoing Belgian rebellion, the new Emperor Leopold II, Holy Roman Emperor, issued a proclamation on 17 March 1790 ordering the Hofkriegsrat that for reasons of economy, all flags were to remain unchanged. His brief reign only lasted until April 1792, so, the flags only changed in 1792 when the Buchstaben (initials) received a bar through the ‘J’, so it became an ‘F’ to display the cipher of the new Francis II, Holy Roman Emperor: ‘FII’, either side of the complicated central shield (this addition of a bar through the J for existing flags distinguishes flags initially issued under Joseph from post-1792 issued flags). With its many quarterings, the shield carried all the coats of arms of the territories held or claimed by the Habsburgs: On the top line are: the arms of Old & New Hungary, Spain (made up of Castille, Leon, Aragon, Navarre), Bohemia; on the second line: Burgundy, Austria/Lorraine under the Archduke's coronet, Tuscany; on the third line: Transylvania (or Siebenbürgen) Lombardy, Mantua; on the bottom line: Habsburg, Flanders, Tyrol. Around the shield are the chains and emblems of the Orders of St. Stephen of Hungary and of Maria Theresa. Above is the red and gold crown of Austria. On the obverse of the white Leibfahne was the Madonna and Child on a cloud with rays of light streaming to the right and left.

Some of the Walloon (Belgian) infantry regiments’ Ordinarfahnen added local symbols: IR55 Murray carried an Ordinärfahne with the red diagonal Cross of Burgundy behind the Doppeladler and the arms of St. Omer below the eagle. However, IR58 Vierset (until 1794)/Beaulieu (1794–98) had a regulation 1780/92 Ordinärfahne with the bar through 'J' to create 'F'.

== 1804 pattern ==
1804 Ordinarfahne from the New York Public Library Collection

An Imperial Patent (order) of 11 August 1804 issued a new pattern to reflect the creation of the creation of the Austrian Empire, but the production order was not given until 28 March 1805. There is only one surviving 1804 Ordinarfahne in the Heeresgeschichtliches Museum (Museum of Military History, Vienna), which seems to differ from the illustrated Ordinarfahne from the New York Public Library Collection, so two appear to have been made. Two new flags were presented to IR4 Deutschmeister, the ceremonial guard line regiment based in Vienna, in June 1806 before the 1806 pattern was decreed, although one of these was a new Leibfahne to replace the one lost in 1805.

Surprisingly, the flag displays the Holy Roman Empire crown above the Doppeladler eagle, whose heads had halos. The Austrian crown now sat on top of the central shield, which was surrounded by the chain of the order of the Golden Fleece. The shield displayed a simple black Doppeladler with the red-white-red barred Bindenshield of Austria on its chest and below it hung a shortened version of the chain and ribbon of the Order of Maria Theresa. The shields on the wings are : (left) Hungary, Galicia-Lodermaria, Venice, Transylvania (or Siebenbürgen), Moravia-Silesia (right) Bohemia, Lower Austria, Salzburg, Styria-Carithia, Tyrol.

== 1806 pattern ==
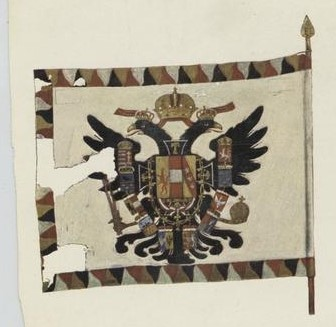
1806 pattern Leibfahne from the New York Public Library Collection

The 1806 pattern, introduced under an Imperial Decree of 6 December 1806, reflected the Emperor's new primary Austrian title and was used until the 1816 pattern was introduced. The provincial shields were moved individually to the outer edge of the eagles’ wings and the Buchstaben were abandoned. The Madonna on the Leibfahne gained a halo of stars and the style of the eagle changed: The heads lost the halos, but were crowned with the new Imperial crown in between. The ribbon running between the heads was now red, rather the previous blue. The central shield only displayed three sections, comprising the arms of Habsburg, Austria and Lorraine respectively. The shield lay over a Deutschmeister cross and was surrounded by the chains of the Orders of the Golden Fleece and Maria Theresa. The arms on the eagle wings were (left side, top to bottom) Hungary, Galicia, Styria, Transylvania (or Siebenbürgen), Moravia-Silesia, (right side, top to bottom) Bohemia, Lower Austria, Tyrol, Würzburg, Upper Austria, Carinthia.

One surviving Ordinärfahne of IR16 Lusignan unusually shows only yellow flames from the outside edge with red, black and white flames facing outwards.

== 1812 campaign ==
A plate by the French artist, Rigo, (No.33) shows Austrian 1792 and 1806 patterns with a commentary by the renowned French vexillogist Pierre Charrie, who suggested a probable distribution of these flags among the Austrian infantry units, which were part of the Auxiliary Korps attached to Napoleon's invasion of Russia in 1812:

1780 Muster (1792 for Franz II)

IR2 Hiller (Hungarian)

IR9 Czartoryski (German)

IR19 Alvinczy (vakat) (Hungarian)

IR30 de Ligne (German)

IR58 Beaulieu (German)

IR33 Colloredo-Mansfeld (Hungarian)

IR34 Davidovich (Hungarian)

IR48 Simbchen (Hungarian)

IR32 Esterhazy (Hungarian)

1806 Muster:

IR39 Duka (Hungarian)

IR41 Kottulinsky (German)

IR12 Liechtenstein (German)

GR 5 (Kreuz) or 6 (St. Georg) Warasdin Grenz district

This does seem to be arbitrary guesswork by Rigo. It would seem unlikely that the former Walloon units – IRs 9, 30 & 58 – which were then recruiting in Galicia, would have retained 1792 pattern flags. Rigo then appears to assume that the Hungarian regiments also retained the 1792 pattern, aside from IR39 Duka, whose 1806 pattern flag is shown on the Heer & Tradition plate under 'Ehrenbände'. He then assumes the remaining German regiments, all recruited in the western part of the empire, and the Grenz Regiments were given 1806 pattern flags.

== Cavalry standards ==
Cavalry regiments always carried one standard per division of two squadrons, the 1st division carrying the Leibstandarte. They measured 71 x 63 cm with the "flames" 6.5 cm wide at the base. It is however thought that Hussar regiments only carried standards on ceremonial occasions.

Cavalry flags seem to have been retained for longer than their infantry counterparts. Three standards from 3. Dragoons, which were captured at Neswiecz on 20 September 1812 by the Russian Alexandria Hussars, appear to date from the reign of Emperor Charles VI (1711–40), although the brass finial is stamped with the post-1806 'FI' cypher of Emperor Franz I. Four cavalry standards captured by the French in the 1805 campaign were of the 1769–1780 pattern as the cypher 'MT' (Empress Maria Theresa 1740–1780) is embroidered either side of the central shield on the eagle.

It is not clear whether any 1804 pattern standards were issued. At the 1909 HGM Exhibition, three standards were displayed. The section states that all three were from the 1804-06 period, which would suggest the 1804 pattern, but the details seem to be for earlier patterns: The first, described as 'German', presumably meaning a regular pattern standard, is attributed to 7. Liechtenstein Husaren (raised 1798, but only from 1801 did it have an Inhaber, namely Prinz Johannes Liechtenstein) and there are no details for the second standard. The third, described as 'Hungarian' appears to be a standard of the Szeckler Husaren. This regiment was raised from the Military Border districts of Siebenbürgen (Transylvania), which was regularised in 1798 as 11. Husaren. The surviving example of this regiment's flag is a green swallow-tailed pennant of the 1765 pattern, but it has been embroidered in silver thread with 'HR' and 'N 11'.

The 1806 cavalry standard resembled the infantry flag, but did not display the provincial shields on its wings. In 1814, the Pope presented an Ehrenstandarte (Ceremonial standard) to 4. Hessen-Homburg Husaren after one squadron escorted him back to Rome from his captivity in Savona.

== French Revolution War & 1805 War Irregular Units ==
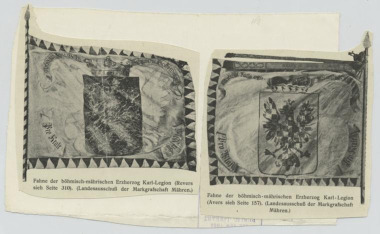
1800 Bohemian & Moravian Legion flags from the New York Public Library Collection

The Lütticher Freiwillige (Lüttich Volunteers) were raised in 1794 by the Bishop of Lüttich (Liege), the unit's flag was diagonally divided in each quarter in yellow and black, overlaid with a white cross and the city arms.

A single-pointed pennant bearing a black Doppeladler and an unknown coat of arms is said to have been captured in the 1796-7 Italy campaign, but it may be an earlier flag as it lacks a contemporary finial. This now hangs in the Musée de l'Armée.

Photographs of surviving 1800 Erzherzog Karl Legion flags appear to show that the designs were fairly consistent. Three are shown in detail with their designs on a white background and red flames pointing out to the edges all round. Two of the flags are shown to the right in black-and-white: The first (on the left) displays the crowned white lion on a red shield as the arms of Bohemia on the obverse. The Latin mottos are: (above) "Legio archiducis Caroli Bohemo-Morava-Silesiana" and (below) "pro Rege, pro Patria " (For the king, for the Fatherland). This was the flag of the 1800 Leib Battalion (Prague Students). On the reverse of its finial was "Sieg oder Tod" (Victory or Death) and beneath, Countess Šliková had a square band attached with on each side: Wlast branjme, Pevne stugme, Gott und Carl bei uns and on the fourth, Charles' monogram " C " and '1800'. The second (on the right) flag displays an eagle covered in a yellow-red chequerboard as the arms of Moravia on a blue shield. Around the Moravian eagle are the mottos: (above) 'Arcyknjžete Karla Czeský-Morawský - a Slezský Wýbor' (Archduke Charles Czech-Moravian and Silesian District) and (below) 'Pro Wlast. Pro Krale' (For the Fatherland. For Charles). Its finial has a Moravian eagle on the front and 'pro Krale a pro Wlast 1800' on the back.

There are also colour photographs of all three flags, where the difference between the two Bohemian flag can be seen in the gap between the lion's head and the top of the shield. The second Bohemian flag, now on display in Prague Castle, has the mottos around the Bohemian arms: (above) 'Arcyknjžete Karla Czeský-Morawský - a Slezský Wýbor' (Archduke Charles Czech-Moravian and Silesian District) and (below) 'Pro krále. Pro vlasť'. The Moravian flag appears to be the same as the black-and-white image. All three display a 1792 pattern Doppeladler on the reverse, which can be partly seen through the background white material. The mottos are German translations: (above) 'Erzherzog Karl böhmisch-mährisch-schlesische Legion' and "für den König, für das Vaterland".

Although the Order of Battle claims the 1805 Wiener Scharfschützen (Vienna Sharpshooters or Geramb after their battalion commander) were at Austerlitz, there is doubt over their presence. However, their flag was white with a black Doppeladler carrying the red-white-red barred Bindenschild. There is a photograph of an 1805 Trieste militia flag.

== 1809 Irregular Unit Flags ==
A large number of Landwehr (secondary militia) and Freiwillige (volunteer) battalions were formed for the 1809 War. Of the Freiwillige, Bohemia provided the six battalions of the Erzherzog Karl Legion and Moravia supplied three battalions of Moravian Freiwillige. As there were 22 Legion battalions in 1800, there was probably no shortage of flags for the 1809 battalions and possibly some Landwehr units. The 'Katalog der Erzherzog Carl Ausstellung zur Jahrhundertfeier der Schlacht bei Aspern' (Catalogue to the Archduke Charles Exhibition for the centenary of the Battle of Aspern) mentions that two 1800 flags were carried at Wagram: 1st EKL Battalion probably carried the Bohemian flag and the 2nd EKL Battalion's flag was a 5-barred flag in yellow over sky blue with a plain black Doppeladler on each side. The six battalions of Wiener Freiwillige (Vienna Volunteers) were presented with three 1806 pattern and three 1792 pattern Ordinarfahnen, although it is only known that the 4th battalion had a 1792 pattern.

Although a January 1809 order specified that each Landwehr battalion carried a single Ordinarfahne with the provincial arms on the reverse, it is unclear how far this was implemented. However, after the reduction to one flag per Line battalion in 1808, there would have been a surplus of Ordinarfahnen, which were probably issued to the Landwehr battalions. Two known Landwehr flags were plain Ordinarfahnen: The 1st Viertel unter Manhartsberg Battalion (Lower Austria) has an identifier in the top corner nearest the staff 1es VUMB; the Prachin Battalion (Bohemia) is just a plain 1806 pattern. Many Landwehr flags were probably quite simple. A rather plain flag, probably red with local arms is the 1809 Saaz Landwehr flag.

However, the Duchy of Styria battalions carried more local symbols, based on an 1808 design, showing a white flag edged with green flames. displaying a white Styrian panther. The Graz battalions carried variations on a local saint (obverse) and the Styrian panther (reverse) in green and white, as was the edging. The 1st battalion flag had green flames facing outward in the upper half of the border and facing inwards on the lower half; on the reverse was a white Styrian panther carrying a small yellow shield on its chest on a green lozenge framed in white with St. Nicholas similarly framed on the obverse. The other battalions displayed the ducal arms on the reverse: a panther in natural dark yellow on a white shield surmounted by a ducal crown on a dark green background, although the 4th battalion panther also displayed a chest shield with 'F1' On the obverse were saints: 2nd: Virgin of Maria-Lankowitz, 3rd: St. Egidius, 4th: St. Leonard, 5th: St. Lawrence. The Bruck battalions carried the Virgin of Mariazell on the obverse and the Cilli (Celje) battalion flags displayed St. Daniel. All the Styrian flagpoles were striped green and white with Ehrenbände in the same colours with mottos such as the 1st Bruck's 'Gott, Kaiser und Vaterland sind unsere Lösung'.

The Prager Bürger-Garde (Prague Civic Guard) comprised 14 companies and 2 companies of Grenadiers. The 1st Grenadier Company was presented with a flag more than 90 years old, displaying a silver lion on a red background.

== Hungarian and Croatian Insurrection ==
The earlier Insurrection infantry flags usually displayed a religious symbol on the obverse and either national or local coats of arms on the reverse. A Hungarian example from 1797 was a white flag, displaying an enthroned Madonna on the obverse and the Hungarian arms on the reverse, while others showed a local saint with the Doppeladler on the reverse. A 1797 Croatian flag from Warasdin (Varaždin) made of damask, has a background of the Croat red/white chequerboard upon which is the Madonna and Child on the obverse; on the reverse are the arms of Warasdin with the motto above 'Vexilium Comitatus Varasdinensis Occasione Generalis Nobilium Insurrections Contra Gallum Finibus Regni' and underneath 'Et Comitatus Aproximanten Indictae in Anno 1797 Erectum'. An 1801 flag presented to the Požega County Jäger battalion of the Croatian Insurrection has a black Doppeladler bearing a square shield with the arms of the Kingdom of Slavonia and the Emperor's cypher "F II" on the reverse; on the obverse is the Madonna with the infant Christ. At the top on both sides is the motto: Pro Deo Rege Et Lege (For God, King and Law).

The 1809 infantry flags, including that of the Odenburg (Sopron) Hungarian insurrection, displayed the Imperial eagle with the county arms.

Documented Hussar examples are all swallow-tailed pennants:

Krasso-Serenyi (Košice) Blue with the Hungarian arms on the obverse and the district arms on the reverse.

Neugrad (Nógrád County (former)): White edged in gold with a roundel showing an armoured cavalryman with a shield displaying the arms of Hungary. Above is 'Neograd-Vannegye' and below is 'Kiralert s hazaert'

Pest (Budapest) (1797): Green with gold edging and decoration with a roundel displaying the arms of Hungary above those of Pest

Raab (Győr): Red over white with the arms of Hungary on the obverse and the motto 'Vincere aut mori'; on the reverse, the arms of Raab with the slogan 'Pro Deo Rege et Patria'

Thuroczar (Zala County (former)): Red brocade with the Hungarian arms on the obverse and county arms on the reverse, edged with gold flames and motto 'Pro Reg. et Regno - Auxiliante Deo - Cott. Thur.'

Zemplin (Zemplén County): Red with a gold border and the slogan 'Pro Rege Lege et Patria'

== Surviving examples ==
In addition to the Museum of Military History, Vienna and Musée de l'Armée, flags captured in the 1805 War are held in the Musée de l’Empéri in Salon, France The Bavarian Army Museum in Ingolstadt holds a 1792-pattern Leibfahne of IR16 Lusignan, which was captured at Wörgl in 1809 and a fragment of the top of an 1806 pattern Ordinärfahne, with blue ribbons coming from the crown instead of the regulation red, is on display in Burg Forchtenstein, Austria An 1806 pattern Ordinärfahne is in the Deutsches Historisches Museum in Berlin.

The second 1800 Erzherzog Karl Legion flag is now in the Vladislav Hall of Prague Castle. The flag of the 1809 2nd Battalion Erzherzog Karl Legion was recorded as being in Marburg (Maribor) in 1909, but is now in the depot of the Heeresgeschichtliches Museum (Museum of Military History, Vienna) in poor condition. The catalogue to the 1909 'Erzherzog Karl Ausstellung' mentions that another three Bohemian and Moravian flags from the 1800 Legion, but gives no more detail. However, another eleven Legion flags are in the depository of Prague Castle, awaiting restoration as they are in poor condition. These are probably the ten flags displayed together in a 1907 black-and-white postcard of the Old Chamber of the castle, together with one, which was previously in Brno.

The 1801 Požega Insurrection flag is in the Croatian History Museum in Zagreb. The 1765 pattern standard of 11. Szeckler Husaren is in the Budapest Military Museum.

== Additional notes ==
1) It has been claimed that Austrian flags from after 1806 and later into the Napoleonic period had identifiers in the top corners and some displayed Hungarian arms on the reverse. These claims seem to come from: Wise, T.: Flags of the Napoleonic Wars (Osprey MAA 78) 1978, which illustrates an 1806 pattern Ordinarfahne attributed to IR12 with upper corner identifier, but no source is provided. There is no regulation prior to the earliest known regular flag with identifiers, an 1816 pattern, held in the Museum of Military History, Vienna and there are no flags with Hungarian arms aside from the Insurrection patterns. However, aside from the 1809 VUMB Landwehr flag, the 1792-pattern Leibfahne of IR16 Lusignan displays L. I. R. 16 in the top corner by the pole. The lettering is under the Doppeladler, but this may be something left by those making the flag.

2) The illustrated flags come from the New York Public Library collection and specifically the Vinkhuijzen Collection of Military Uniforms. The Library states that it believes these pictures come from a scrapbook completed by Dr. Vinkhuijzen before 1910 and are thus in the public domain.
