= Suchohrdly =

- Municipality
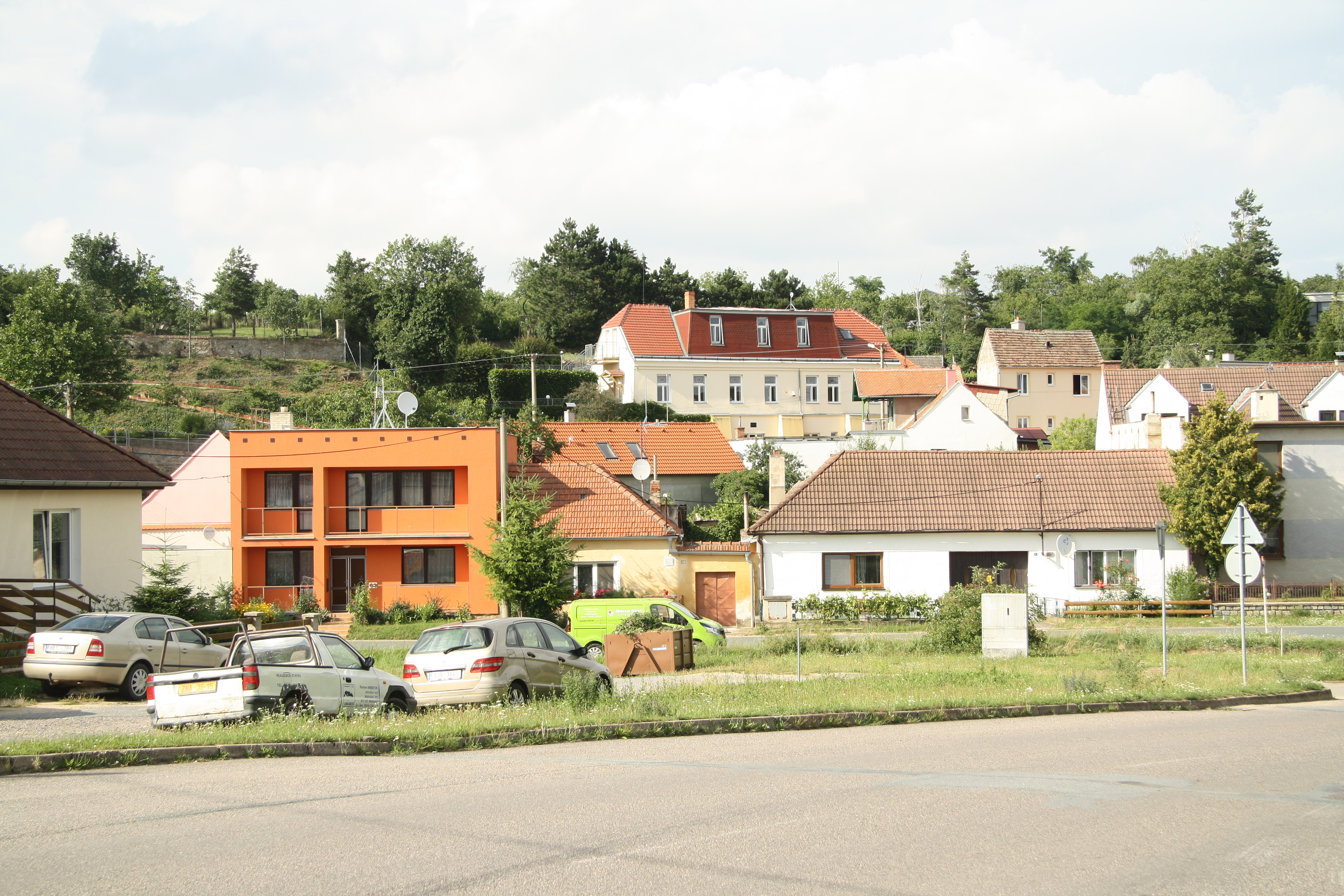
- Centre of Suchohrdly

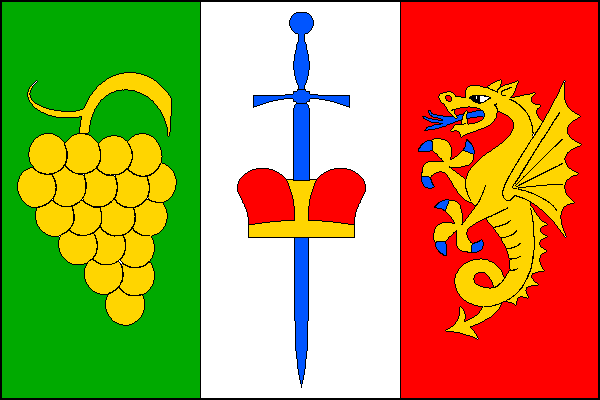
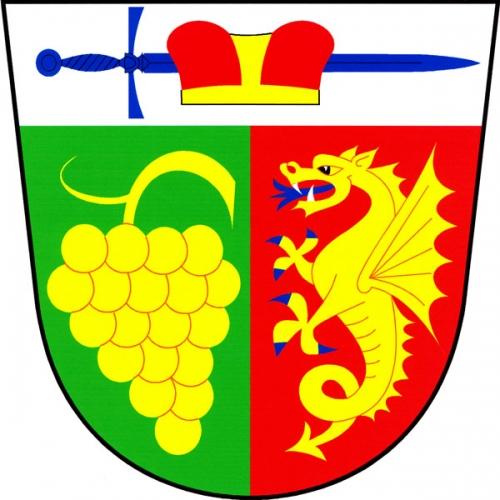
- Flag Coat of arms

- Location in the Czech Republic
- Coordinates: 48°51′58″N 16°5′20″E
- Country: Czech Republic
- Region: South Moravian
- District: Znojmo
- First mentioned: 1190

Area
  - Total: 13.68 km^{2} (5.28 sq mi)
- Elevation: 290 m (950 ft)

Population (2026-01-01)
  - Total: 1,431
  - Density: 104.6/km^{2} (270.9/sq mi)
- Time zone: UTC+1 (CET)
  - Summer (DST): UTC+2 (CEST)
- Postal code: 669 02
- Website: www.obec-suchohrdly.cz

Suchohrdly (German: Zuckerhandl) is a municipality and village in Znojmo District in the South Moravian Region of the Czech Republic. It has about 1,400 inhabitants.

Suchohrdly lies approximately 3 kilometres (2 mi) north-east of Znojmo, 53 km (33 mi) south-west of Brno, and 182 km (113 mi) south-east of Prague.

== Demographics ==
Historical population
Year	Pop.	±%
1869	436	—
1880	473	+8.5%
1890	627	+32.6%
1900	738	+17.7%
1910	757	+2.6%
1921	813	+7.4%
1930	871	+7.1%
1950	856	−1.7%
1961	989	+15.5%
1970	956	−3.3%
1980	900	−5.9%
1991	928	+3.1%
2001	984	+6.0%
2011	1,146	+16.5%
2021	1,369	+19.5%
Source: Censuses
