= Battle of Schöngrabern =

Part of the War of the Third Coalition (1805)

Battle of Schöngrabern (or Hollabrunn)
- Part of the War of the Third Coalition
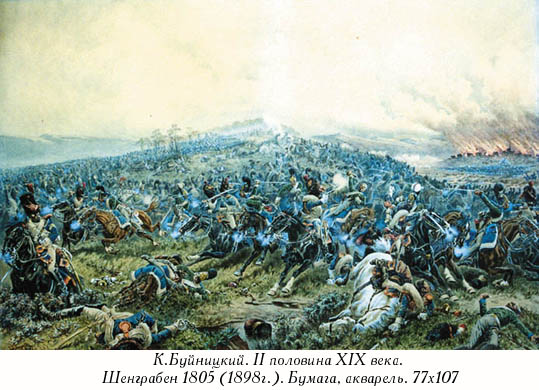
- Battle of Shengraben (of Hollabrunn) by K. Bujnitsky
Date	16 November 1805
Location	Schöngrabern, Hollabrunn 48°36′51″N 16°01′11″E
Result	French victory

Belligerents
France	Russia

Commanders and leaders
(First French Empire) Jean Lannes; (First French Empire) Joachim Murat; (First French Empire) Louis Suchet; (First French Empire) Nicolas Oudinot	(Russian Empire) Pyotr Bagration

Strength
20,661–30,000; • 16,000 participated	7,000–7,300

Casualties and losses
1,200–2,000	2,648–3,000; • 1,200 killed, wounded, or missing; • 1,448–1,800 captured
- Location within Europe

War of the Third Coalition:
Austria
current battle
Napoleon in command
Napoleon not in command

The Battle of Schöngrabern, also known as the Battle of Hollabrunn, was an engagement in the Napoleonic Wars during the War of the Third Coalition, fought on 16 November 1805 near Hollabrunn in Lower Austria, four weeks after the Battle of Ulm and two weeks before the Battle of Austerlitz (Slavkov, Moravia - now Czech Republic).

== Battle ==
The Russian army of Kutuzov was retreating north of the Danube before the French army of Napoleon. On 13 November 1805, Marshals Murat and Lannes, commanding the French advance guard, had captured a bridge over the Danube at Vienna by falsely claiming that an armistice had been signed, and then rushing the bridge while the guards were distracted. Kutuzov needed to gain time to make contact near Brno (Brünn) with reinforcements led by Buxhowden. He ordered his rearguard under Major-General Prince Pyotr Bagration to delay the French.

Murat and Lannes commanded the 4th and 5th Corps and the Reserve Cavalry. Bagration took up a position about 6 km north of Hollabrunn, on the hill above the small town of Schöngrabern (today part of Grabern). Murat believed the whole Russian army was before him and hesitated to attack. Bagration then suggested to Murat that negotiations for an armistice should be opened. Murat agreed and did not attack. When Napoleon was informed of this, he was furious and wrote to Murat:

I cannot find words to express my displeasure. You only command my vanguard and have no right to agree to an armistice without my orders. You will cost me the fruits of a campaign. End the armistice at once, and attack the enemy. Inform him that the general who has signed this has no power to make it, that only the Russian Emperor has the right, and that when the Russian Emperor ratifies this agreement, I will also ratify it. But it is only a ruse. March, destroy the Russian army. You are in a position to take his baggage and artillery.

On 16 November 1805, Murat informed Bagration that the armistice would end at 5:00 pm. The confused action took place during the night. After sustaining several French assaults and holding the position for six hours, Bagration was driven out and executed a skilled and organised withdrawal to retire northeast to join the main Russian army. His skillful defence in the face of superior forces successfully delayed the French enough for the Russian forces of Kutuzov and Buxhowden to unite at Brno (Brünn) on 18 November 1805.

== In popular culture ==
The battle is depicted in Leo Tolstoy's novel War and Peace. Prince Andrei Bolkonsky is present and attaches himself to the artillery battery of Captain Tushin. As the battle progresses, the battery ends up alone and unsupported, becoming the deciding factor in the successful withdrawal of the Russian troops. Later that evening, some Russian staff officers accused Captain Tushin of abandoning his artillery pieces rather than retreating with the guns as ordered. Prince Andrei tells Bagration that there were no supporting Russian troops and that Captain Tushin and his men might have been vital in delaying the French advance.

Given the lack of detail in historical sources for this battle, it is unclear how closely Tolstoy's version of the battle relates to the historical action.

== Notes ==
Preceded by Battle of Dürenstein	Napoleonic Wars; Battle of Schöngrabern	Succeeded by Battle of Austerlitz
