= Filain, Haute-Saône =

Filain
- Commune
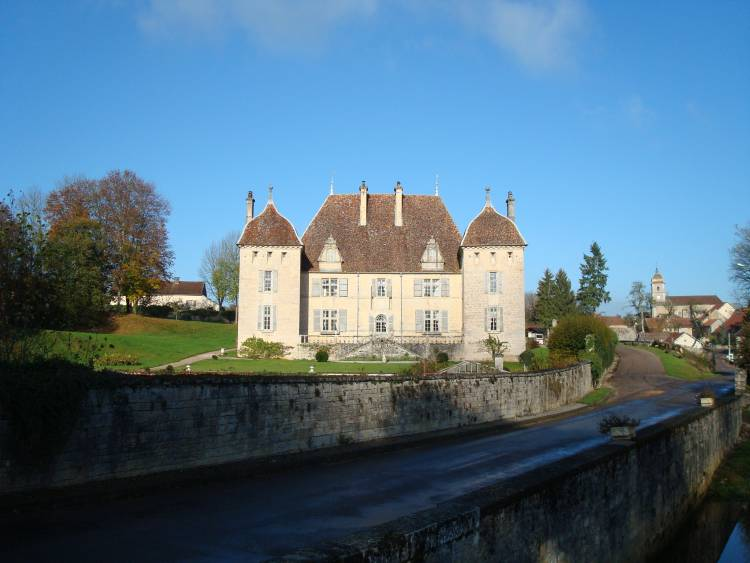
- The chateau in Filain
- Location of Filain
- Location within France Location within Bourgogne-Franche-Comté
- Coordinates: 47°31′11″N 6°11′02″E
- Country: France
- Region: Bourgogne-Franche-Comté
- Department: Haute-Saône
- Arrondissement: Vesoul
- Canton: Rioz

Government
  - Mayor (2020–2026): Matthieu Gannard
- Area^{1}: 15.79 km^{2} (6.10 sq mi)
- Highest elevation: 401 m (1,316 ft)
- Lowest elevation: 257 m (843 ft)
- Population (2023): 217
  - Density: 13.7/km^{2} (35.6/sq mi)
- Time zone: UTC+01:00 (CET)
  - Summer (DST): UTC+02:00 (CEST)
- INSEE/Postal code: 70234 /70230
- ^{1} French Land Register data, which excludes lakes, ponds, glaciers > 1 km^{2} (0.386 sq mi or 247 acres) and river estuaries.

Filain (French pronunciation: [filɛ̃]) is a commune in the Haute-Saône department in the region of Bourgogne-Franche-Comté in eastern France.

== See also ==
- Communes of the Haute-Saône department
