= Le Plessier-sur-Saint-Just =

- Commune
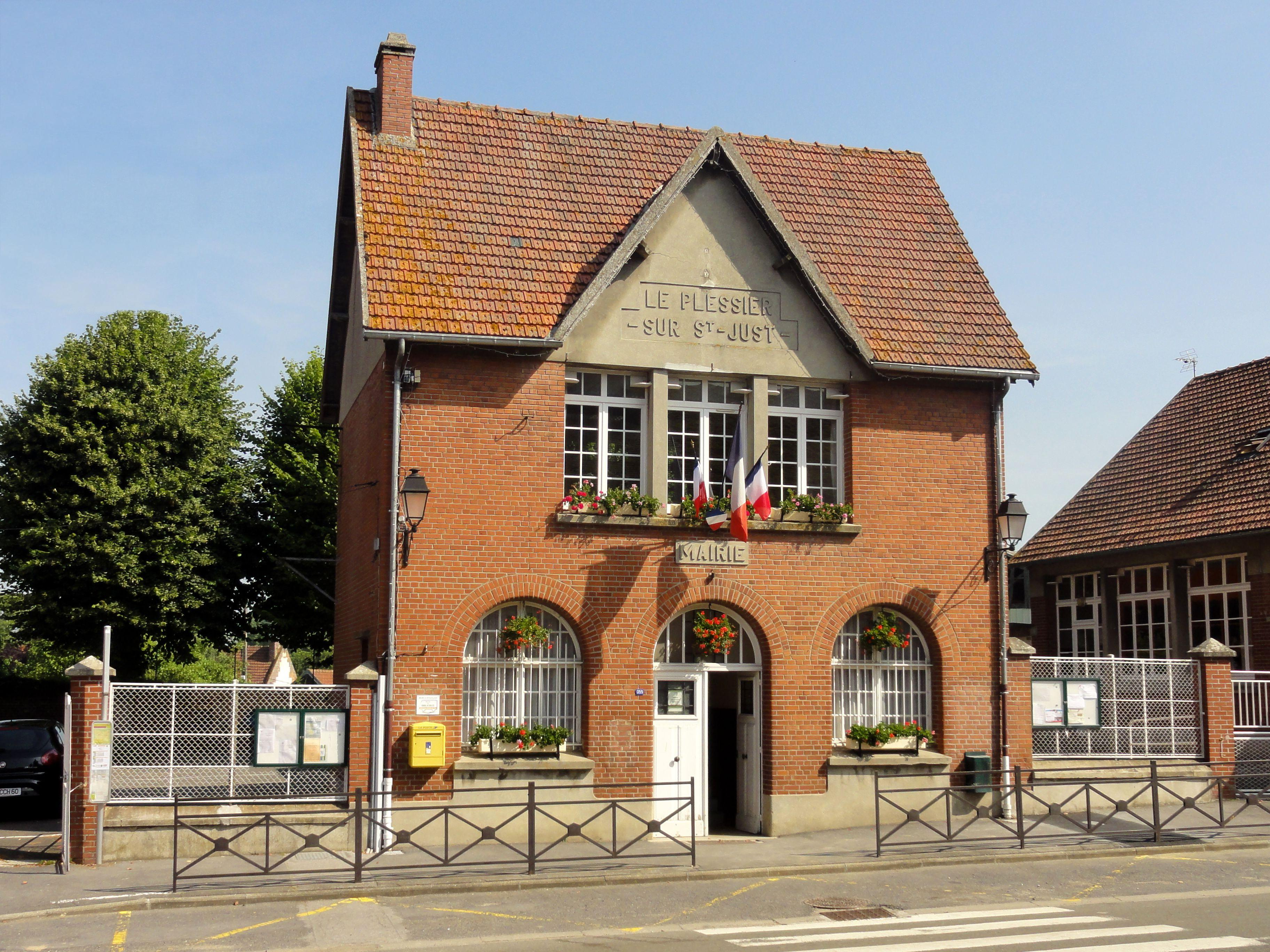
- The town hall in Le Plessier-sur-Saint-Just
- Location of Le Plessier-sur-Saint-Just
- Location within France Location within Hauts-de-France
- Coordinates: 49°30′42″N 2°27′17″E
- Country: France
- Region: Hauts-de-France
- Department: Oise
- Arrondissement: Clermont
- Canton: Saint-Just-en-Chaussée
- Intercommunality: Plateau Picard

Government
  - Mayor (2024–2026): Maryse Lefevre
- Area^{1}: 7.63 km^{2} (2.95 sq mi)
- Elevation: 110 m (360 ft)
- Highest elevation: 162 m (531 ft)
- Lowest elevation: 90 m (300 ft)
- Population (2023): 521
  - Density: 68.3/km^{2} (177/sq mi)
- Time zone: UTC+01:00 (CET)
  - Summer (DST): UTC+02:00 (CEST)
- INSEE/Postal code: 60498 /60130
- ^{1} French Land Register data, which excludes lakes, ponds, glaciers > 1 km^{2} (0.386 sq mi or 247 acres) and river estuaries.

Le Plessier-sur-Saint-Just (French pronunciation: [lə plɛsi syʁ sɛ̃ ʒy(st)], literally Le Plessier on Saint-Just) is a commune in the Oise department in northern France.

== See also ==
- Communes of the Oise department
