= Battle of Znaim =

1809 battle of the War of the Fifth Coalition

- Part of the War of the Fifth Coalition
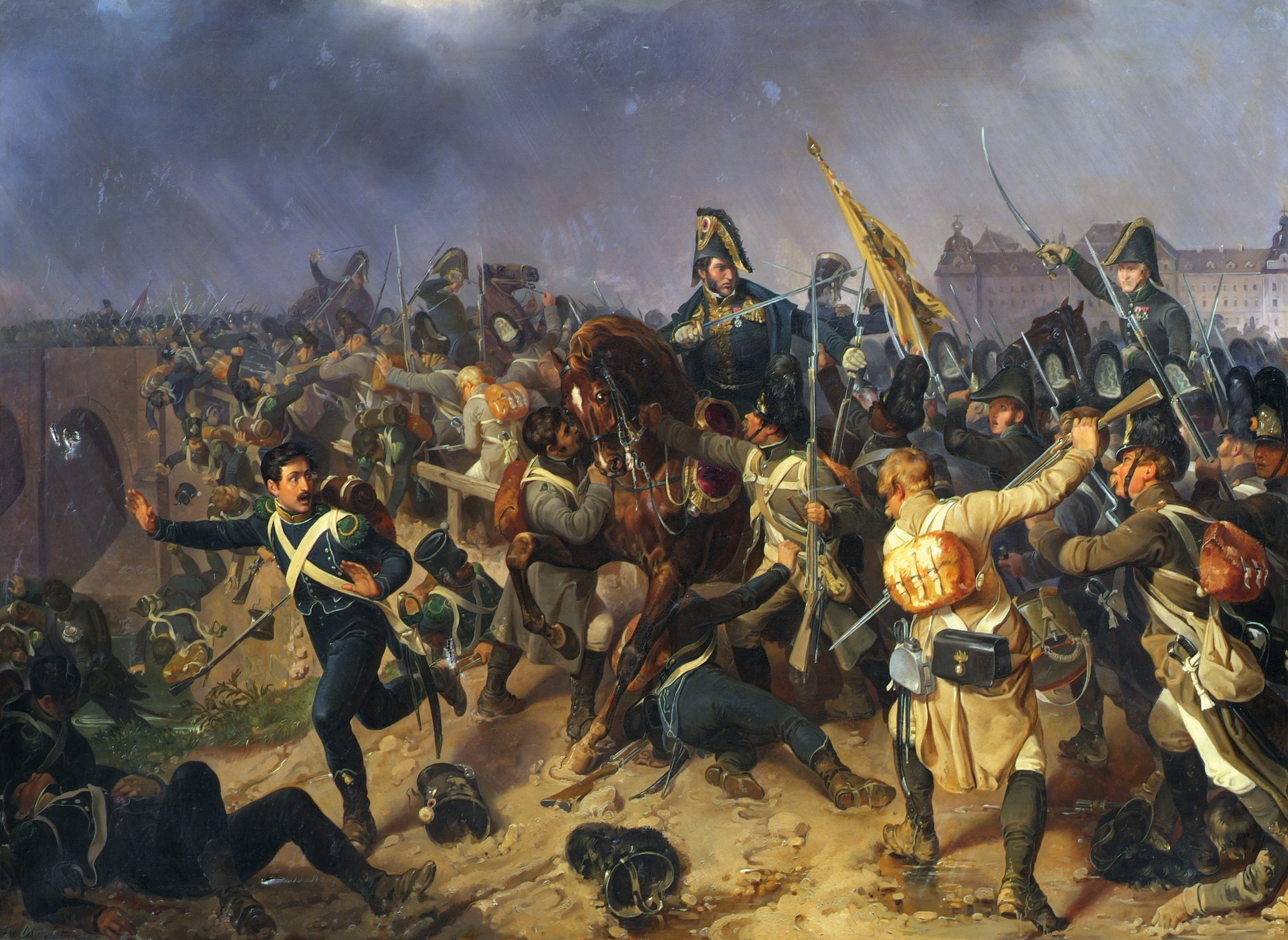
- Episode from the meeting near Znaim 1809
Date	10–11 July 1809
Location	Znojmo, South Moravian Region 48°51′20″N 16°2′56″E
Result	Inconclusive

Belligerents
(France) French Empire	Austrian Empire

Commanders and leaders
Auguste de Marmont on the 10th, joined by Napoleon I and André Masséna on the 11th	Archduke Charles of Austria

Strength
36,660	64,000 (40,000 engaged)

Casualties and losses
3,000	5,000–6,000, 2 guns

Following defeat at the Battle of Wagram, Archduke Charles retreated north into Bohemia hoping to regroup his battered forces. The French army had also suffered in the battle and did not give immediate pursuit. But two days after the battle, Napoleon ordered his troops north intending to defeat the Austrians once and for all. The French eventually caught up the Austrians at Znaim (now Znojmo, Czech Republic) on 10 July 1809. Realising they were in no position to give battle, the Austrians proposed a ceasefire as Archduke Charles went to begin peace negotiations with Napoleon.

However, Marshal Auguste de Marmont refused to observe the ceasefire and committed his XI Corps of around 10,000 men into battle. With Marmont greatly outnumbered, André Masséna had no choice but to support him. By 11 July, Masséna's corps had joined Marmont's in battle but the Austrians had also reinforced their position around the town of Znaim. After two days of futile fighting, with both sides suffering similar casualties and neither side gaining any advantage, Napoleon finally arrived with news of an armistice and ordered Marmont to end the battle. The Battle of Znaim was the last action between Austria and France in the War of the Fifth Coalition.

== Prelude ==
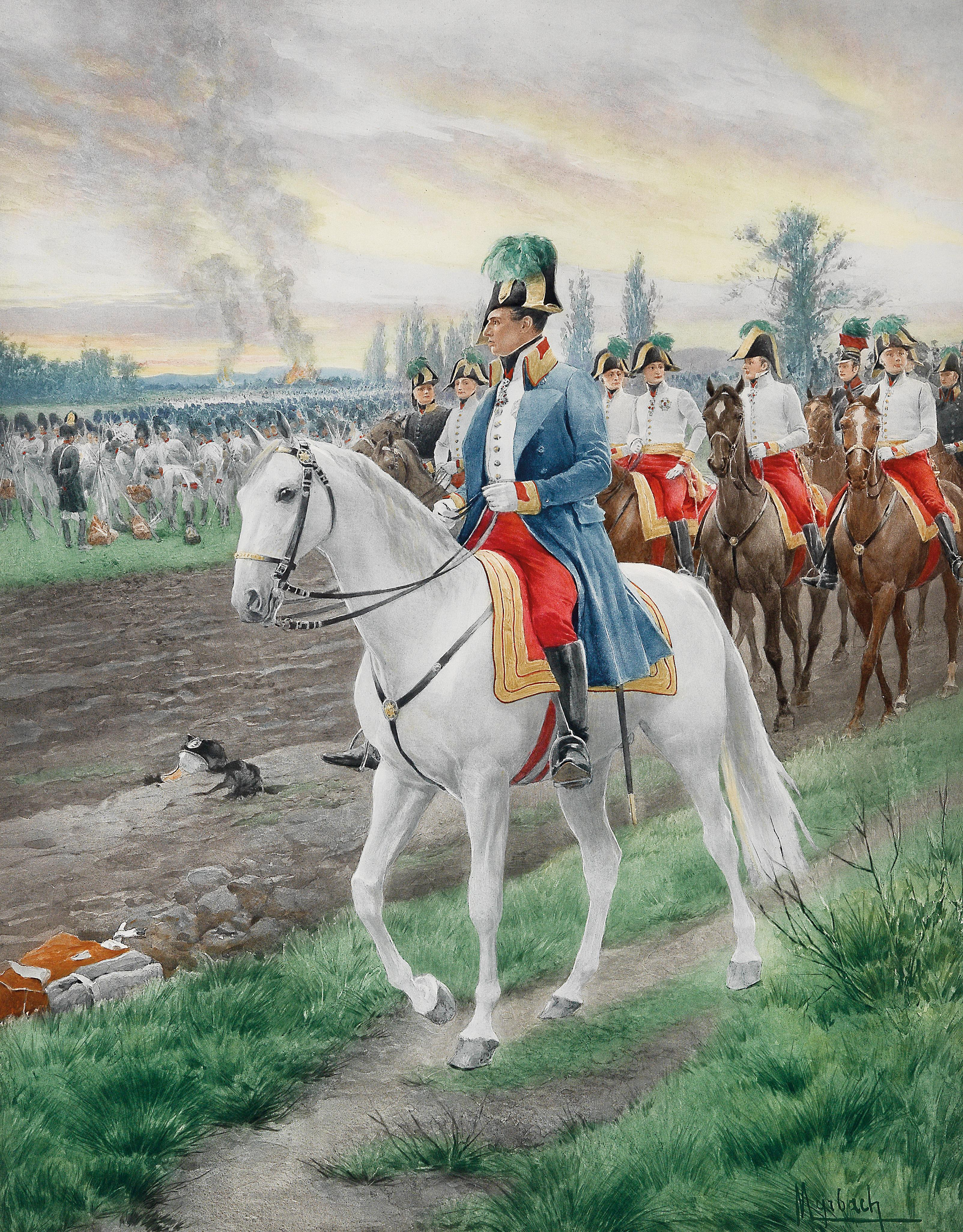
Archduke Karl with his staff

The immediate cause of the two-day Battle of Znaim was the decision of the Austrian commander in chief, Archduke Charles, to stage a rearguard action near the town of Znaim, about 80 kilometers north of Vienna, in order to give his army time to withdraw its baggage train in safety toward Moravia. Marmont’s two combined French and Bavarian corps were the first of Napoleon’s troops to arrive on the field following the course of the river Thaya. Believing that he faced only a rear guard, Marmont ordered his Bavarian troops to take the village of Tesswitz south of Znaim, while the rest of his troops attacked the village of Zuckerhandl.

== Battle ==
The Bavarians succeeded in storming Tesswitz but were then thrown out by Austrian reinforcements. Marmont renewed the Bavarian attack, and Tesswitz was retaken, only to be lost soon after. The village changed hands a number of times during the day, this contest constituting the heaviest fighting the Bavarians saw in the whole campaign. Marmont had hoped to swing his cavalry in behind the Austrian rear guard, but on reaching high ground above Tesswitz, they were faced with five enemy corps. The French cavalry was forced to withdraw in the face of a large body of Austrian cuirassiers.

Marmont was now engaged by 40,000 Austrian troops and was heavily outnumbered. His men nevertheless managed to hold on to both Tesswitz and Zuckerhandl overnight. Archduke Charles withdrew his forces into a strong defensive position situated so as to hold the north bank of the Thaya and Znaim. Napoleon arrived at Tesswitz at 10:00 A.M., and despite the fact that he had brought with him reinforcements of cavalry and artillery, he believed that his force was too weak to launch a full-scale attack. His plan therefore was to employ Masséna’s corps to pin the Austrians throughout the day and to await the corps of marshals Louis-Nicolas Davout and Nicolas Oudinot, which would be able to arrive early on the twelfth. Masséna launched his attack on the extreme right of the Austrian position during midmorning and quickly seized the main bridge across the Thaya south of Znaim. His troops took two small villages and then advanced directly on Znaim. Charles meanwhile reinforced the Austrian position with two grenadier brigades, which advanced during a thunderstorm and initially threw the French back.

== Aftermath ==
French and Austrian staff officers rode at approximately 7:00 p.m. along the opposing lines announcing a cease-fire, which led to the signature of an armistice on 12 July 1809. Znaim was to prove the last action of the War of the Fifth Coalition. The two sides signed a treaty of peace at the Schönbrunn Palace on 14 October 1809.

== Bibliography ==
- Gill, John H. (2016). Leggiere, M. (ed.). Napoleon and the Operational Art of War. Leiden: Brill. ISBN 978-90-04-27034-3.
- Gill, John H. (2020). The Battle of Znaim: Napoleon, The Habsburgs and the end of the War of 1809. Barnsley: Greenhill Books. ISBN 978-1784384500.
