= Haugsdorf =

- Municipality
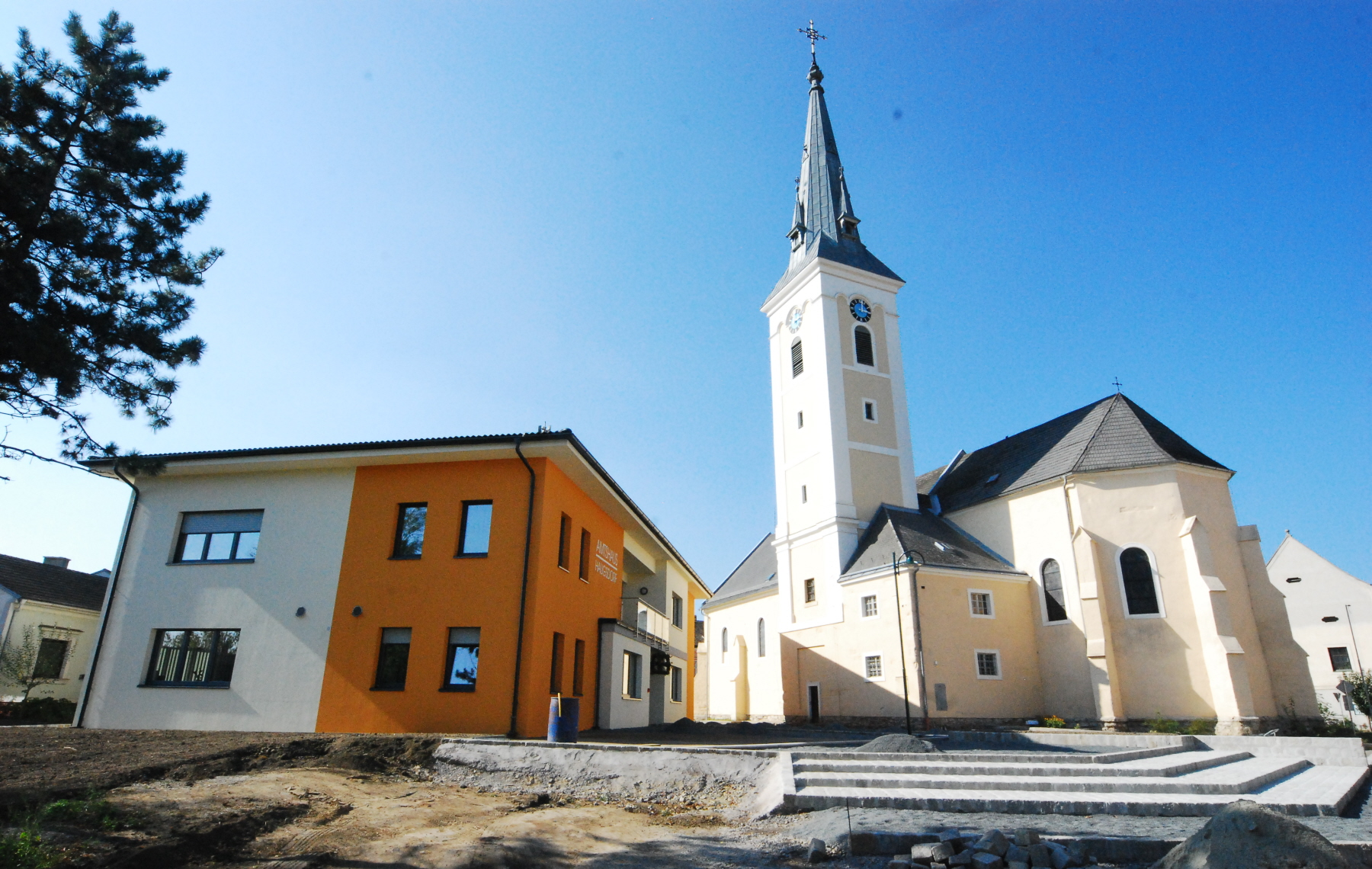
- Haugsdorf town hall and parish church

- Location within Austria
- Coordinates: 48°42′N 16°4′E
- Country: Austria
- State: Lower Austria
- District: Hollabrunn

Government
  - Mayor: Johann Bauer

Area
  - Total: 21.25 km^{2} (8.20 sq mi)
- Elevation: 204 m (669 ft)

Population (2018-01-01)
  - Total: 1,548
  - Density: 72.85/km^{2} (188.7/sq mi)
- Time zone: UTC+1 (CET)
  - Summer (DST): UTC+2 (CEST)
- Postal code: 2054
- Area code: 02944
- Website: www.haugsdorf.at

Haugsdorf is a town in the district of Hollabrunn in Lower Austria, Austria.

== Population ==
Historical population
Year	Pop.	±%
1869	2,916	—
1880	3,256	+11.7%
1890	3,451	+6.0%
1900	3,471	+0.6%
1910	3,375	−2.8%
1923	3,056	−9.5%
1934	2,967	−2.9%
1939	2,884	−2.8%
1951	2,677	−7.2%
1961	2,261	−15.5%
1971	2,089	−7.6%
1981	1,908	−8.7%
1991	1,775	−7.0%
2001	1,711	−3.6%
2011	1,616	−5.6%
