= Jacob François Marulaz =

French military officer (1769–1842)

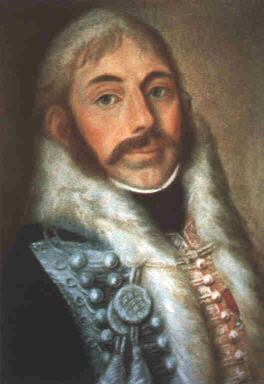
- Born: 6 November 1769; Zeiskam, in modern-day Germany
- Died: 10 June 1842 (aged 72) Filain, Haute-Saône, France
- Allegiance: France
- Branch: Cavalry
- Service years: 1784 – 1815, 1830 – 1834
- Rank: General of Division
- Conflicts: French Revolutionary Wars; Napoleonic Wars
- Awards: Order of Saint Louis, 1814
- Other work: Baron of the Empire, 1804

Jacob François Marulaz or Marola (6 November 1769 - 10 June 1842), joined the Army of the Kingdom of France as a cavalry trooper and rose to become a field officer during the French Revolutionary Wars. Under the First French Empire, he became a general officer and fought under Emperor Napoleon in two notable campaigns.

He became a cavalryman under the Ancien Régime and by 1798 he commanded a regiment of cavalry. He fought in the 1806–1807 campaign in Poland, commanding a brigade of cavalry. During the 1809 Danube campaign, he led a division of corps cavalry and played a prominent role. Afterward, he commanded forces in the interior. He retired from service after the Hundred Days and briefly returned to active duty in the 1830s. MARULAZ is one of the names inscribed under the Arc de Triomphe, on Column 11.

== Early career ==
Born on 6 November 1769 in Zeiskam in territory then belonging to the bishop of Speyer (in modern-day Germany), Marulaz enlisted in the French army's Esterhazy Hussar Regiment in 1784. While in this unit, which became known as the 3rd Hussars, he was promoted to Farrier in 1791 and Quartermaster in 1792.

== French Revolution ==
In 1792, Marulaz became a lieutenant in a units of scouts which soon became the 8th Hussar Regiment. He fought in the Austrian Netherlands in 1792 and was promoted to captain in March 1793. He took part in several actions in the War in the Vendée in late 1793. In May 1794, he was elevated to Chef d'escadron and participated in the Flanders Campaign during the War of the First Coalition. He distinguished himself at the head of 30 hussars on 15 September in the Battle of Boxtel. October 1794 found him fighting near Mainz. In October 1795 he fought near Huningue near the Switzerland border. He fought the Swiss near Bern in March 1796 and captured a number of enemy soldiers.

Marulaz received promotion to Chef de brigade (colonel) of the 8th Hussars on 28 December 1798 in time for the War of the Second Coalition. He fought in the First Battle of Zurich on 4 June 1799, the 8th Hussars being attached to the 7th Division. On 15 June he led a successful raid on an enemy camp, capturing 400 men. He was shot five times, including one ball that passed right through his body from side to side, breaking two ribs. At the start of Jean Moreau's 1800 campaign, the 8th Hussars belonged to Dominique Vandamme's division of Claude Lecourbe's corps. This division fought at the battles of Stockach and Messkirch in April 1800. During the Battle of Hohenlinden campaign that fall, the 8th Hussars were assigned to Charles Gudin's division and fought at Salzburg on 14 December 1800.

== French Empire ==
In 1803, Marulaz was confirmed as colonel of the 8th Hussars. He became a member of the Légion d'honneur and a Baron of the Empire in 1804. He was elevated to the rank of general of brigade on 6 March 1805 and briefly was in charge of the Haute-Saône. In October he was called to command a cavalry brigade in the Grande Armée.

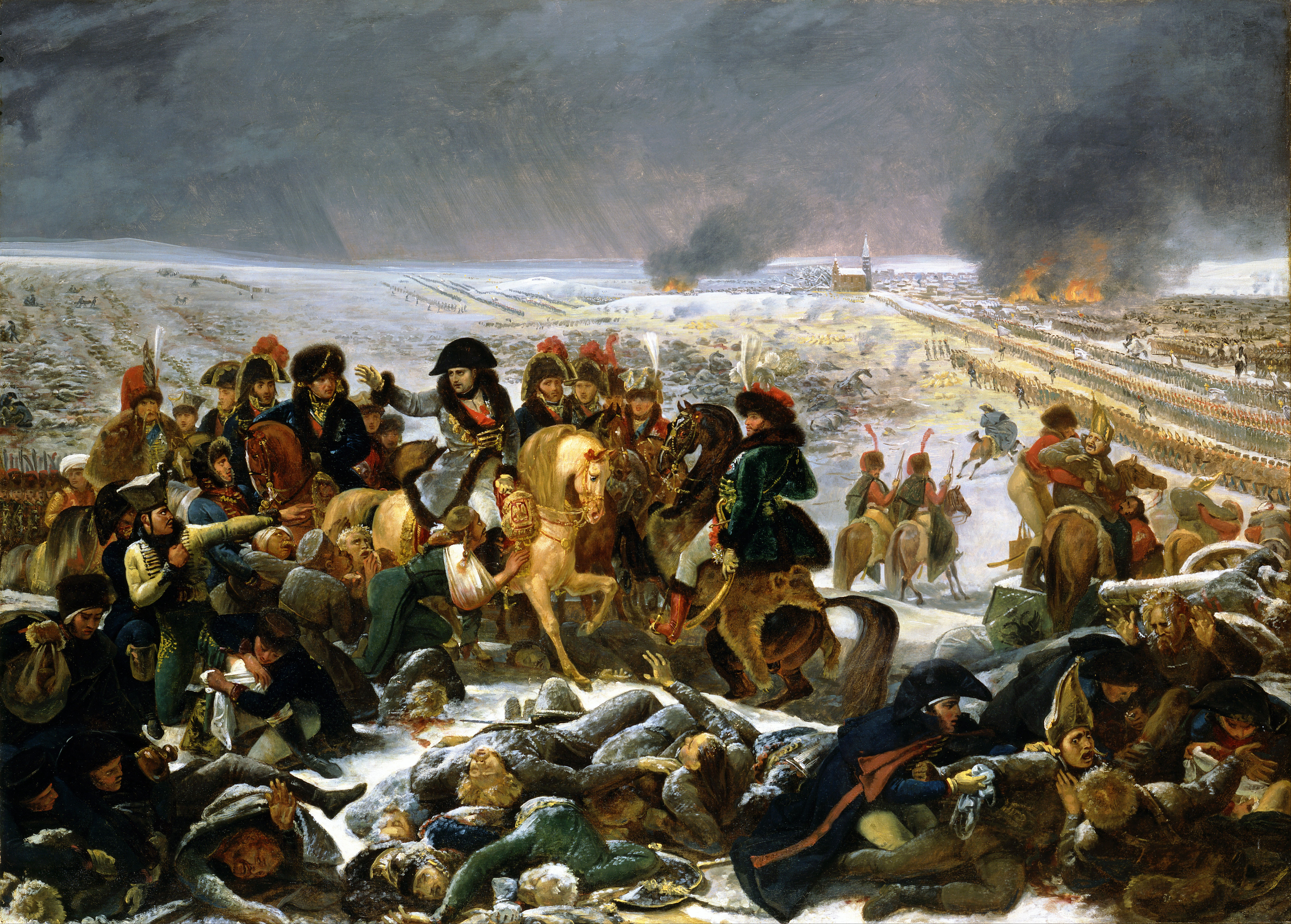
Napoleon on the Battlefield of Eylau, by Antoine-Jean Gros

During the War of the Fourth Coalition, Marulaz led a cavalry brigade at the Battle of Golymin on 26 December 1806. At the Battle of Eylau on 8 February 1807, he led Marshal Louis Davout's III Corps cavalry brigade. Under his orders were the 1st and 12th Chasseurs à Cheval Regiments, the 2nd Chasseurs having been assigned to other duties. At first his troopers covered the advance of Louis Friant's division, then drove off some cossacks. Marulaz took a position guarding the right flank and repelled an attack by Russian cavalry. He became embroiled in the bitter fight over possession of the village of Klein Sausgarten. During Davout's subsequent advance, Marulaz protected the extreme right flank of the III Corps. Late in the afternoon, his cavalry were attacked by the late-arriving Prussians near the village of Kutschitten and driven back along with the rest of Davout's troops. The 12th Chasseurs of his brigade was present at the Battle of Heilsberg on 10 June 1807.

Still a general of brigade, Marulaz found himself leading Marshal André Masséna's IV Corps cavalry division at the outset of the War of the Fifth Coalition. His 2,765-man command included the 3rd, 14th, 19th, and 23rd Chasseurs à cheval Regiments, in addition to the Baden Light Dragoon and Hesse-Darmstadt Chevauléger Regiments. On the morning of 21 April 1809, the 23rd Chasseurs seized the bridge over the Isar River at Moosburg in a brilliant coup. Marulaz's cavalry quickly crossed to the east bank and turned northeast toward Landshut where Johann von Hiller's Austrians were making a stand. That day, Napoleon defeated Hiller in the Battle of Landshut. The emperor hoped to catch the Austrians in a pincer attack between his forces and Masséna's.

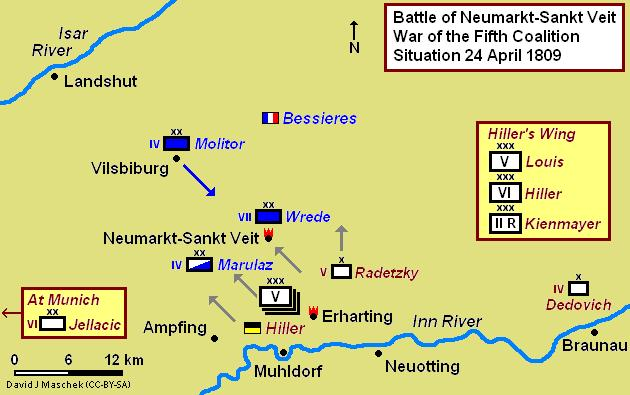
Map of the Battle of Neumarkt-Sankt Veit, 24 April 1809

Marulaz marched rapidly down the east bank of the Isar until he found his way blocked by Austrian infantry defending the southwest suburbs of Landshut. He sent a courier galloping for infantry assistance. Soon Louis Jacques de Coehorn's infantry brigade arrived and Marulaz asked him to clear away the Austrian foot soldiers. However, Coehorn was unwilling to advance without orders from his division commander, Michel Marie Claparède. When one of Masséna's staff officers tried to argue with Claparède, that general obstinately refused to help Marulaz. By the time Masséna appeared and ordered the infantry forward, it was too late; Hiller's troops escaped what might have become a trap.

On 22 April, Napoleon took most of his troops to the north to fight Archduke Charles in the Battle of Eckmühl. The emperor appointed Marshal Jean-Baptiste Bessières to lead a task force consisting of Marulaz's division, Karl Philipp von Wrede's Bavarian division, and Gabriel Jean Joseph Molitor's French infantry division. The force was instructed to pursue Hiller's command. Late on 23 April, Hiller turned on his pursuers. Marulaz, leading the 3rd and 19th Chasseurs and an infantry battalion, collided with the Austrians at Erharting village, just north of Mühldorf. The outnumbered French quickly pulled back to Neumarkt-Sankt Veit. Hiller attacked Bessières on 24 April in the Battle of Neumarkt-Sankt Veit. During the action, Marulaz was unable to hold back the Austrian center column. After the defeat, Bessières pulled back to Vilsbiburg.

Hiller was soon in full retreat to the east with the French in pursuit. Near the villages of Kallham and Riedau on 1 May 1809, Marulaz's Baden Dragoons scored a splendid success when they broke an Austrian infantry square. After the foot soldiers fired a volley, the dragoons charged, broke into the square, and cut down its commanding officer. At this, the 3rd battalion of the Jordis Infantry Regiment # 59 laid down its weapons and 16 officers and 690 soldiers became prisoners.

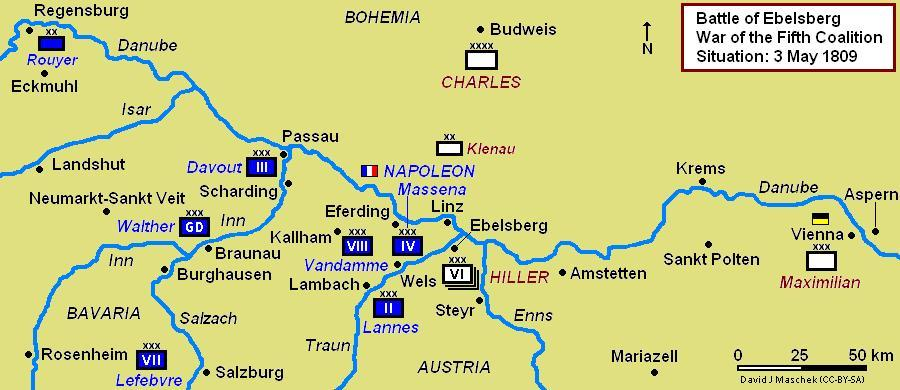
Marulaz led the IV Corps advance guard in the pursuit from Landshut to Vienna.

On the morning of 3 May, Marulaz pressed aggressively against Hiller's rearguard near Linz. By 10:00 AM, he found the Austrians under Joseph Radetzky von Radetz and Karl von Vincent holding Klein München village, just west of the Traun River. Marulaz deployed his French regiments in the front line and his Germans in the second. At this time another Austrian column under Emmanuel von Schustekh arrived and began filing over the bridge at Ebelsberg. Attacking a village packed with infantry was not a job for cavalry, so Coehorn's brigade was summoned. The French foot soldiers soon flushed the Austrians from the houses and there was a stampede of troops dashing for the bridge with Marulaz's horsemen hacking at the fugitives. In the confusion, the French captured hundreds of Austrians. Coehorn's leading elements forced their way across the span and the vicious Battle of Ebelsberg resulted. When the Austrians began to fight back hard, the elite company of the 19th Chasseurs crossed to join the action. Before the battle was over, the French lost at least 4,000 men and the Austrians 4,495, and numbers of wounded soldiers were burnt to death when the town caught fire.

With his division numbering only 1,960 sabers, Marulaz fought in the Battle of Aspern-Essling on 21 and 22 May. During the first day, the French infantry held the two villages on the flanks while cavalry divisions under Marulaz, Antoine Lasalle, and Jean-Louis-Brigitte d'Espagne defended the center. At 4:00 pm, Napoleon ordered Marulaz to attack Austrian infantry near Aspern while the other two divisions charged the enemy cavalry. Marulaz charged no less than 17,000 infantry and 50 cannons belonging to Prince Friedrich Franz Xaver of Hohenzollern-Hechingen's column. Archduke Charles brought two additional infantry regiments to Hohenzollern's support and personally rallied the troops. Against such odds, the attack failed, Marulaz had three horses shot under him, and his chief of staff was killed. However, the cavalry attacks delayed the Austrian offensive. After 6:00 pm, the village of Aspern fell and the archduke ordered Hohenzollern to break the weak French center. Bessières sent his horsemen in charge after charge to stave off defeat. In one charge, Marulaz smashed through the Austrian cavalry only to be confronted with an unbroken array of enemy infantry. His horse fell dead and Marulaz only escaped capture when a lieutenant offered him his own mount. Eventually, the battle petered out with the French center still intact.

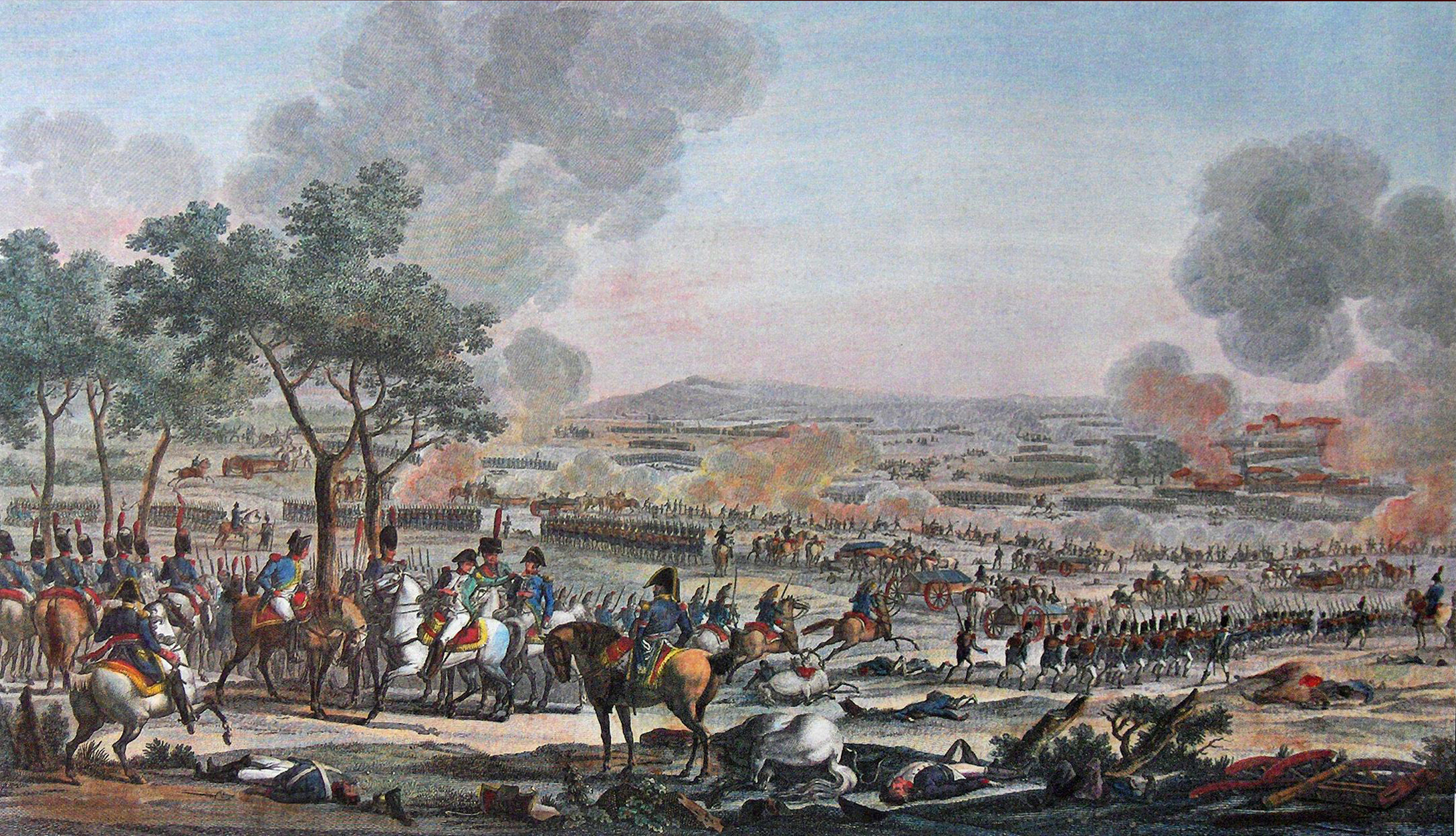
Battle of Wagram by Carle Vernet

On the second day, Marulaz and Lasalle charged no less than three times in assisting the attack of Marshal Jean Lannes in the center. The French horsemen were repeatedly thwarted by new Austrian tactics. After overthrowing the first Austrian line, they found themselves confronted with a second line they were unable to overcome. At this time Marulaz suffered a serious wound.

At the Battle of Wagram on 5 and 6 July, Marulaz led the 23rd Chasseurs, Hesse-Darmstadt Chevaulégers, 1st Prince Royal Bavarian Chevauléger Regiment, and two Bavarian 6-pounder artillery batteries, a total of 1,223 sabers, 301 gunners, and 12 cannons. His other regiments were on detached duty. In the early hours of the first day, Marulaz crossed to the north bank with the rest of the IV Corps. Masséna posted his infantry with its left flank on the river and sent Marulaz and Lasalle to guard his right flank. While the infantry overran the Austrian riverbank defenses, the cavalry helped clear away some stray enemy units. Later in the day, he deployed on the left flank with IV Corps and missed the unsuccessful late afternoon attack.

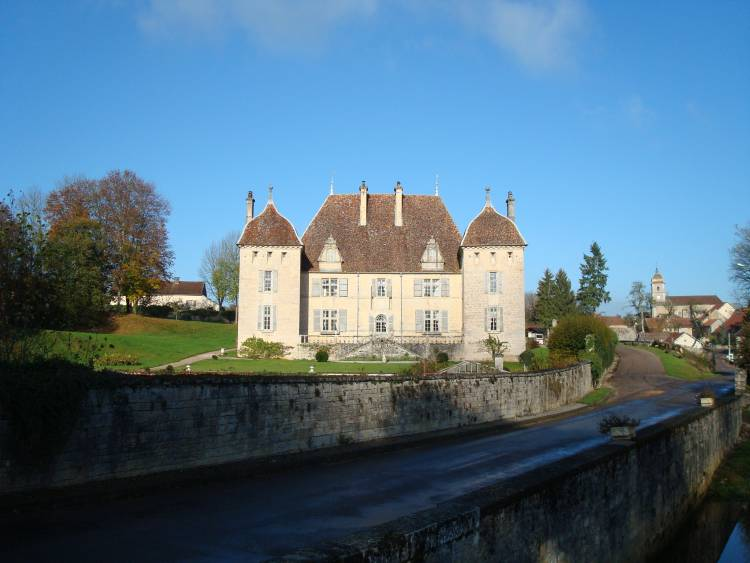
Marulaz acquired the Château de Filain in 1808 and died there in 1842.

At 2:00 am on 6 July, Masséna shifted his corps toward the center, leaving only Jean Boudet's infantry division holding the left flank. That morning Archduke Charles launched a dangerous attack on the French left flank and succeeded in defeating Boudet's troops. At 11:00 am, Napoleon sent Masséna to retake the ground on the left. Marulaz made several charges to help Boudet's troops, then he managed to surprise and overrun an Austrian artillery battery. The guns were quickly retaken by enemy hussars, but with Lasalle's assistance, the hussars were driven away and two cannons captured. This incident marked the high tide of the Austrian advance.

During the pursuit, Marulaz's troopers proved unable to break two steady Austrian squares. A 12-pounder battery was brought up to blast the enemy, and the chase went on. When an Austrian bullet fatally struck Lasalle, Marulaz made a speech to his old 8th Hussars from Lasalle's division, reminding them he was their former colonel. Ending the harangue with, "You will charge. Marulaz is at your head", he led a charge. He was shot in the arm, but he didn't relinquish command until a cannon shot killed his horse and he was badly stunned in the fall.

Pleased with Marulaz's performance, Napoleon promoted him to general of division on 12 July 1809 and appointed him to command the 6th Military Division at Besançon. From 8 January to 20 April 1814, he successfully withstood a siege of Besançon by Prince Aloys Liechtenstein and 12,000 Austrian troops. Marulaz's 9,000-man garrison included elements of the 2nd, 38th, 64th, 93rd, and 154th French Line Infantry Regiments, the 3rd and 4th Swiss Infantry Regiments, and the 25th Chasseurs à Cheval Regiment. As many as 1,000 of his troops were killed, wounded, or died of illness during the siege. The Austrians withdrew when Napoleon abdicated.

Marulaz accepted the Bourbon Restoration and was made a Chevalier of the Order of Saint Louis in 1814. He held a number of positions under King Louis XVIII but during the Hundred Days, he switched his allegiance to Napoleon. After the emperor's final defeat at the Battle of Waterloo, he was forced to retire from military service in October 1815.

== Later career ==
Marulaz remained in retirement until the July Revolution of 1830. On 7 February 1831 he was placed in the General Staff reserve and retired from the army for the last time on 1 December 1834. He died at the Château de Filain on 10 June 1842. He had acquired the property in 1808. During his military career, he was wounded 19 times and had 26 horses killed under him.
