= Austrian Army during the French Revolutionary and Napoleonic Wars =

Kaiserlich-königliche Armee
- Country: Holy Roman Empire; Austrian Empire
- Type: Army
- Role: Land warfare

Commanders
- Current commander: Holy Roman Emperor Francis II

The Imperial-Royal or Imperial Austrian Army (German: Kaiserlich-königliche Armee, abbreviated k.k. Armee), during the French Revolutionary and Napoleonic Wars, was the armed force of the Habsburg monarchy under its last monarch, the Habsburg Emperor Francis II, composed of the Emperor's army. When the Holy Roman Empire was dissolved in 1806, it assumed its title of the troops of the Austrian Empire under the same monarch, now known as Emperor Francis I of Austria.

== Command and organisation ==
=== High Command ===
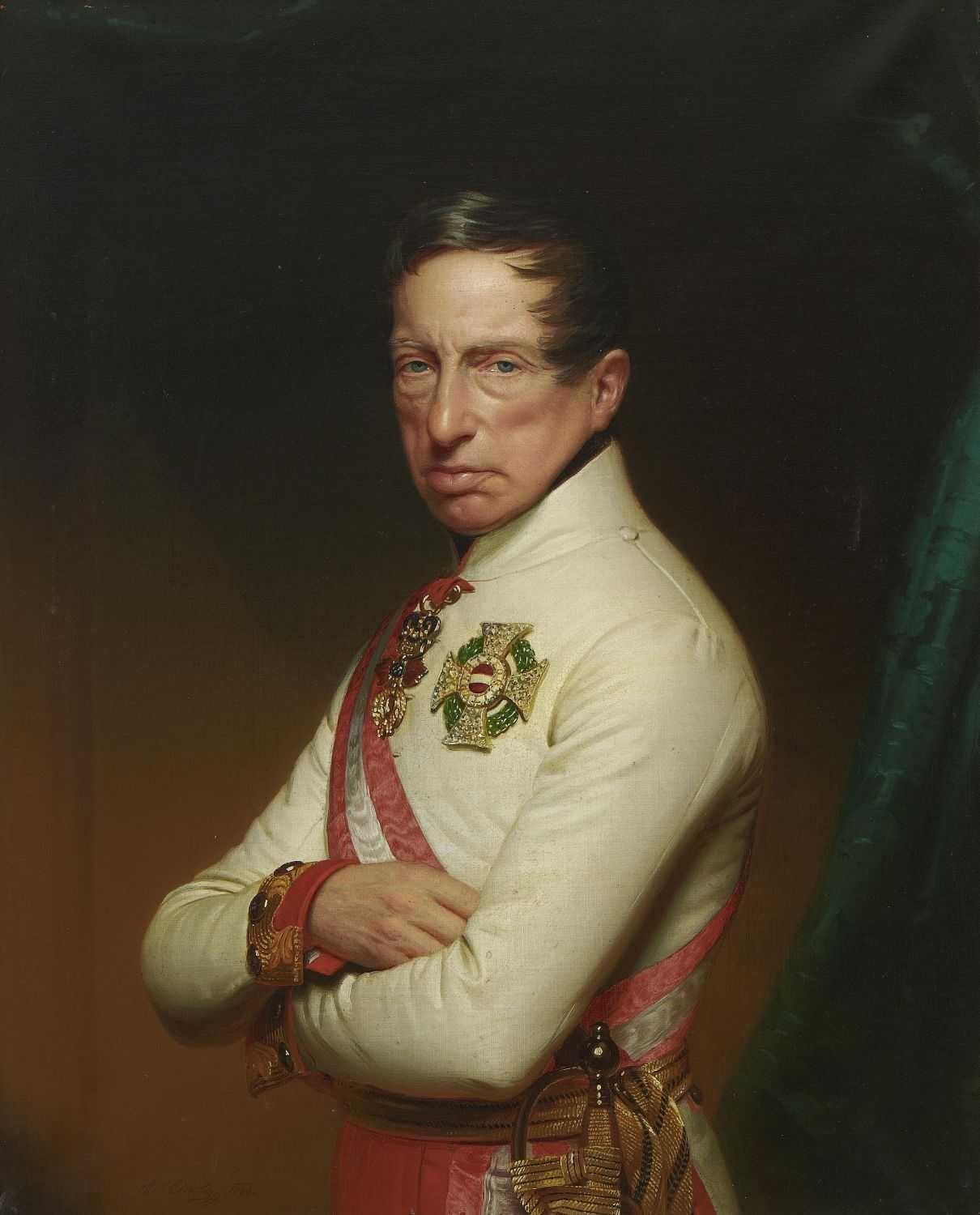
Archduke Charles, who initiated a major reform of the Austrian Army

Prior to Archduke Charles reforms, the Austrian High Command was highly centralised and characterised by an inefficient bureaucracy. Decision-making was slow and there was a lack of clear lines of responsibility. The Hofkriegsrat (Court War Council) was the supreme military administrative and command authority of the Habsburg Monarchy. It had been established since the 16th century and had both administrative and operational functions. It was a collective body consisting of several officers and civil servants. Decisions were often made in long meetings, which in practice led to delays. The Court War Council controlled the organisation of the army, supplies, recruitment and strategic planning. After the defeat at the Battle of Marengo (1800), Charles was appointed President of the Court War Council in 1801 and began a comprehensive reform that extended to the structure of the High Command and the entire army organisation. Archduke Charles separated the administrative role of the Court War Council from the operational leadership of the field armies. The Court War Council remained responsible for organisation, supply and recruitment, while operational command was transferred to the respective field commander. In addition, he reformed the General Staff by introducing the office of Chief of the General Staff.

The 1757 regulations had created the Grosse Feldgeneralstab, 'Great Field General Staff', and Kleine Generalstab, 'Small General Staff', and after changes in 1769, a permanent staff of 30 officers was established under the director, Franz Moritz von Lacy, which would be expanded in wartime with junior officers. The Grosse staff was divided into three: First, the intrinsecum, which handled internal administration and directing operations; secondly, external activities, including the pioneers; thirdly, the inspection service, which handled the issuing of orders and prisoners of war. Alongside the general staff was the general adjutant, who led a group of adjutant staff selected by the army commanders to handle the details of internal administration and collating intelligence, and answered to the commander-in-chief. The Chief of Staff became the chief adviser to the commander-in-chief and, in a fundamental move away from the previous administrative role, the chief of staff now undertook operational planning, while delegating the routine work to his senior staff officers. Staff officers were drawn from line units and would later return to them, the intention being that they would prove themselves as leaders during their time with the staff. In a battle or when the army had detached corps, a small number of staff would be allocated to the column commander as a smaller version of headquarters. The senior man, usually a major, would be the chief of the column staff and his principal task would be to help the commander to understand what was intended. On 20 March 1801, Feldmarschalleutnant Peter Duka von Kadar became the world's first peacetime Generalquartiermeister at the head of the staff and the wartime role of the chief of staff was now focused on planning and operations to assist the commander. Archduke Charles, himself produced a new Dienstvorschrift, 'Service Regulations', on 1 September 1805, which divided the staff into four departments:

- Geheime Kanzlei des Erzherzogs (Secret Chancellery of the Archduke) Responsible for drafting all reports and relations to the Emperor, imperial proclamations, correspondence with the Court War Council, allied and enemy powers and censorship of military writings.
- Operations-Kanzlei (Operations-Chancellery) Responsible for all operational matters, intelligence, registration and collection of all military files.
- Detail-Kanzlei (Detail-Chancellery) Responsible for compiling rank and service tables as well as army orders and proclamations.
- Armee-General-Commando (Army General Command) Responsible for commissariat, transport, military and financial matters. Also responsible for rations, transport and packing.

== Recruitment ==
=== Enlisted men ===
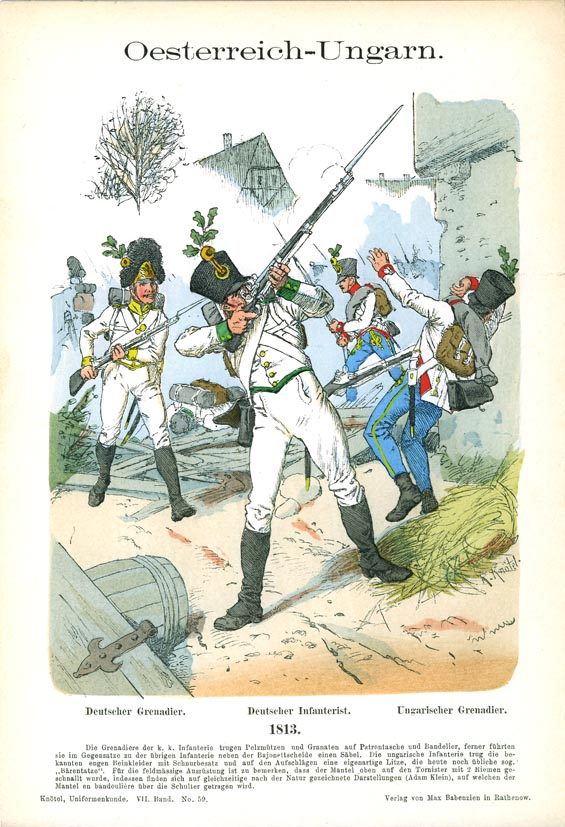
Austrian infantry in 1813

Conscription was implemented across the Hereditary and Bohemian (western) lands in 1781, based on population rolls from each regiment's district. The conscription regime applied to all able-bodied men within the age range of 17 to 40 years, with those in the 18 to 26 age group being selected for enlistment first. Exemptions from this obligation were granted to a range of individuals, including nobles and priests, as well as most skilled workers, such as miners and employees of licensed factories. Additionally, numerous townspeople and all free peasants and their eldest sons were exempt. Consequently, the burden of conscription fell primarily on the younger sons of peasants and the urban proletariat. Service was for a challenging 25 years (effectively life), with the exception of bakers and equipment suppliers, who enlisted for three years. Prior to 1802, release was only possible in the event of complete incapacity, or through inheritance, purchase or marriage, with the requirement to run a property or business, conditional upon the district providing a substitute.

=== Officers ===
The officer corps, which came from different ethnic groups and social classes, reflected the character of the Habsburg state. As the local nobility refused to be centralized in the early days of the standing army, the Habsburgs often entrusted the supreme command to foreign military personnel and mercenaries. However, most of the officers came from the Habsburg lands: German-Austrians, Hungarians, Czechs, Italians, Croats and Walloons. The nobility rejected military service, as the reforms had removed many financial incentives and changed the nature of the profession, and specialized knowledge became a prerequisite for leading armies that were too large to be entrusted to inexperienced individuals, regardless of their talents, courage or wealth. Most members of the nobility were unwilling to submit to military discipline and acquire technical skills through hard work. Maria Theresa was therefore forced to open her military academies (the Theresian Military Academy in Vienna-Neustadt, which opened in 1752, and the Academy of Engineering in Vienna) to the sons of the impoverished lesser nobility as well as to commoners, generally the sons of serving officers and civil servants. Future officers entered the academy at juvenile age and were accepted into the cavalry or infantry after four years of training. Training at the engineering academy lasted eight years and focused on vocational subjects. Despite these measures, the number of graduates from the two academies, around 60 per year, was insufficient.

== Branches ==
=== Infantry ===
Deutschmeister troops in 1804

At the outset of war in 1793, the army numbered fifty-seven line regiments, and Seventeen Grenzer light infantry regiments. By 1793 there were 57 line infantry regiments, two garrison regiments, one garrison battalion and 17 border infantry regiments. Like the officers, the infantrymen came from all parts of Austria. The German regiments consisted of two field battalions of six fusilier companies each and one garrison battalion of four companies. Including a detachment of gunners and infantry to operate the three 6-pounders issued to each battalion, the nominal strength was 4,575 men all ranks. The Hungarian regiments consisted of three field battalions and one garrison battalion with a strength of 5,508, again including the allocated 'line' artillery.

In 1792 neither type was at full strength. Fusilier companies with a war establishment of four officers and 230 men usually had only three officers and 120 men. In addition, each German or Hungarian regiment had a grenadier 'division', two companies considered elite units, dressed in high and heavy bearskin hats, which were often combined with other divisions to form composite grenadier battalions commanded by a lieutenant colonel. Grenadier regiments consisted of two field battalions of six companies each, with a regimental headquarters, 256 sharpshooters armed with an over-and-under rifle and an artillery detachment with three 3-pounders. When the regiments left for foreign service, a local reserve was left, organised into two Landes-Defensions, 'National Defense', divisions.

=== Light infantry ===
The Grenzers formed the basis of the light infantry in the Austrian Army. Though primarily used as border troops to reinforce the Military Frontier, the Austro-Ottoman border, in war time, at least 1-2 battalions of a Grenzer regiment would be detached from the regiment in order to join the frontlines and serve as vanguards. These Grenzers performed consistently well in every battle they participated in, with many French soldiers regarding them highly and considering them the only "warlike" units in the Austrian Army. Even Napoleon did not hesitate to use some Grenzer regiments after his victory over Austria in 1809. In 1808, IR64 (Infantry Regiment No. 64) was broken up and its nine divisions formed the rifle-armed cadre divisions (two companies), which were each augmented by two divisions of carbine-armed troops to form the nine new Jäger battalions.

=== Cavalry ===
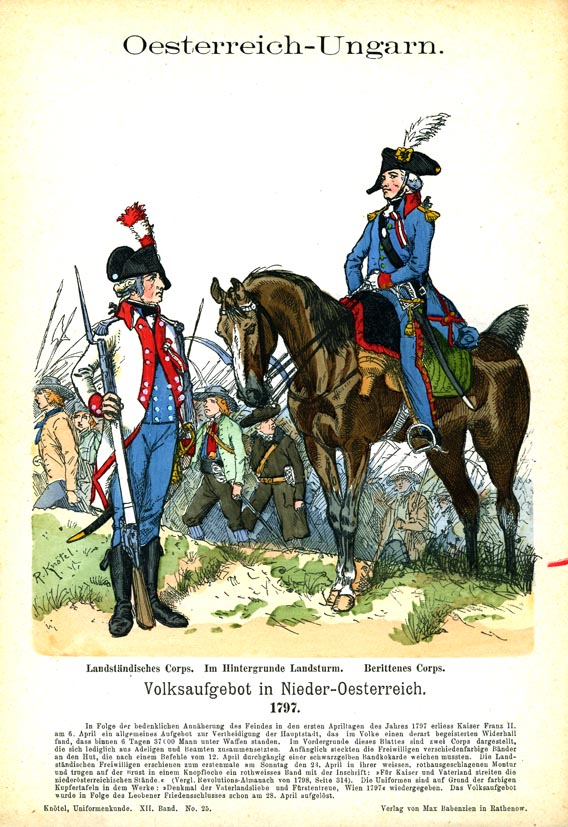
Austrian cavalryman (right) in 1797

During the War of the First and Second Coalition, the Austrian cavalry demonstrated unrivalled superiority over their French counterparts. However, by 1809, any such notions of supremacy had been severely dispelled. While the Austrian cavalry's tactics and training remained static, the French had developed a cavalry capable of functioning collectively. The majority of the Austrian cavalry was distributed in a dispersed manner to the various infantry formations, which resulted in numerous instances of their being overwhelmed by superior enemy numbers at the point of attack. While the individual components of the Austrian cavalry, such as the cuirassiers, dragoons, chevau-légers and uhlans, retained their combat effectiveness, the lack of coordination among these forces severely impeded their operational effectiveness. The inherent limitations of the prevailing command system impeded the full expression of the cavalry's lethal potential, and the implementation of successive reorganisations proved ineffective in rectifying these deficiencies.

The recruitment of cavalrymen followed a similar modus operandi to that employed for infantrymen. The stipulation that they should have been drawn from the ranks of those who had already completed their infantry training was largely ignored. Cavalry regiments, notably those of Hungarian units, frequently had a surfeit of prospective recruits. This phenomenon was reflected in the financial incentives offered to enlisting men in the smaller south German states, which constituted a significant portion of the Austrian army's manpower. Specifically, an infantry recruit received 35 florins, while a cavalry recruit received 29, thereby underscoring the preference for the mounted arm among the broader pool of potential recruits.

=== Artillery ===
By 1790, Austria's artillery was considered the best in Europe. The artillery was under the command of the Director-General of Artillery. From 1772 it was organized into the Feldartillerie (field artillery), the Garnisonsamt (garrison force) and the Feldzeugamt (administrative organization with responsibilities across the artillery service). The field artillery was raised in three regiments (increased to four in 1802), each consisting of four battalions divided into four companies, that could increased to a total of 22 in wartime. In 1805, an artillery company was made up of 4 officers, 14 non-commissioned officers, 159 gunners and 5 other men. This was increased in 1808 to 5 officers, 14 NCOs, 2 musicians and 180 men.

The garrison artillery unit comprised personnel deemed unfit for field service and was organised into 14 districts, responsible for the defence of fortresses and other key locations. In addition to their primary function, these units were also tasked with reinforcing field crews when required. The cavalry guns fell under the jurisdiction of the Feldzeugamt / Zeugwesen (Field Ordnance Office / Ordnance Department), which oversaw the manufacture and repair of guns and equipment, in addition to the supply and testing of powder. A detachment was assigned to accompany each army reserve artillery park during campaigns. The main arsenals were located in Vienna, Prague, Olmütz (today Olomouc) and Budweis (Bohemia; today České Budějovice), with numerous smaller reserves dispersed throughout the Habsburg Lands.

Artillerymen were trained at the Artillery Korps school near Budweis and in the elite Bombardeur Corps formed by Feldzeugmeister Franz Ulrich Prince Kinsky, by 1786. After relocating to Vienna in 1790, the corps introduced a seven-year programme of study, encompassing mathematics, geometry, physics, chemistry, surveying, fortification, military administration, tactics and practical exercises. Students who successfully completed the full course, typically in their early twenties, were commissioned, while those who completed the five-year curriculum were appointed enlisted gun captains.

The Austrian artillery inventory included 24-pounder, 18-pounder, 12-pounder, 6-pounder, and 3-pounder cannons, as well as 7- and 10-pounder howitzers. Notably, the inventory also featured the use of 30-pounder, 60-pounder, and 100-pounder Coehorn mortars. While the heavy mortars and some of the heavier cannon were made of iron, the lighter guns were made of bronze. The practical outer limits for the 12-pounders were 1,200 to 900 paces, and up to 800 paces for the lighter pieces using solid round shot. The range of howitzer shells was comparatively limited, while case shot (canister) was employed for anti-personnel work at closer ranges.

As at 1790, the field establishment consisted of 948 field pieces, including 798 guns, 86 howitzers and 64 cavalry pieces. By 1800, the siege park had grown to 248 pieces, including 128 heavy guns, 32 heavy howitzers, and 88 mortars. In 1805, of the 1,257 field guns in service, 184 were classified as cavalry pieces. Following the 1808 reforms, many 3pdrs were kept in depots, resulting in the Austrian field force having 742 guns organised into 108 batteries. In addition, the calibres became heavier, with the 1813 Army of Bohemia's 52 batteries including eleven 12pdr and two 18pdr batteries, with just three 3pdr batteries for light brigades. Prior to 1808, line infantry battalions were supported by their own light guns. Allocation of guns was dependent on both terrain and likely opposition. In Italy, most regiments were equipped with six 3pdr cannons, whereas four 3pdrs and a 6pdr were more typical in Germany. Additionally 7pdr howitzers were added in the early years of the Revolutionary War, but were quickly phased out.

All remaining guns were located in the reserve, where they were organised into batteries. These batteries could either operate independently, especially in support of the advance guard, or in support to the main gun line. In contrast Lighter guns were allocated for battlefield support as required, with heavier guns already placed in position at the commencement of a battle. Depending on the size of the army involved, between 200 and 400 gunners remained with the reserve. Their role was to prepare the reserve guns for movement and replace casualties. During the early 1790s, 18-pounder and 10-pounder howitzers were organised into either position or reserve batteries, with the reserve holding at least a third of all the guns, although this was increased to approximately half in Italy, where lighter battalion guns were utilised.

== Reforms ==
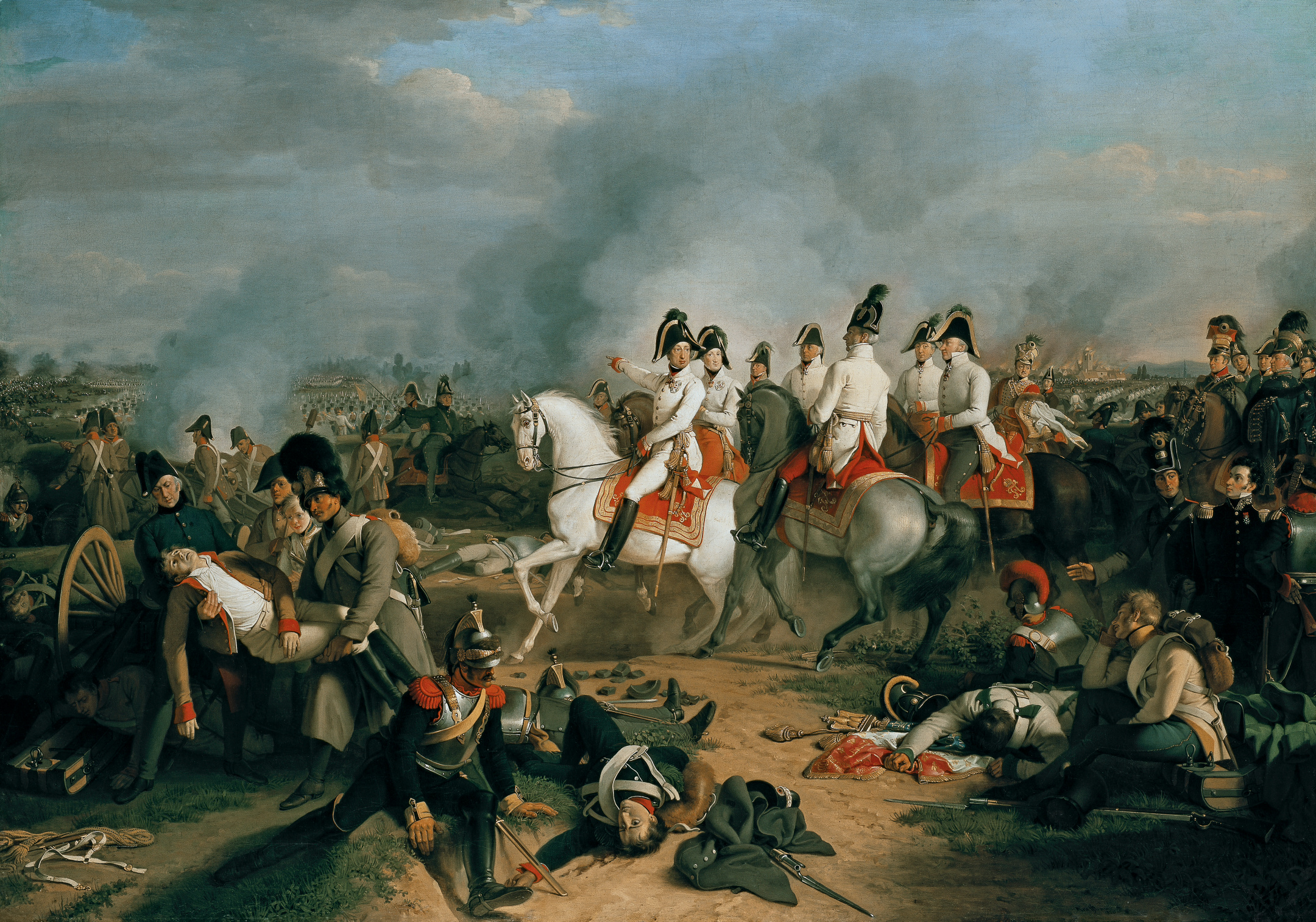
The Battle of Aspern-Essling, which demonstrated the effectiveness of the Austrian Army's reforms

The events of 1805 presented a valuable opportunity for comprehensive reform, yet the outcomes were limited in scope. Between 1805 and 1809, Charles enhanced the combat capabilities of the army. He dismissed ineffective generals and strengthened the Quartermaster General Staff. He introduced superior tactical formations, brigades and corps, though not divisions. He prioritised the concentration of artillery and reduced the number of battalion pieces. Furthermore, he improved the status of the military train, with its officers being granted recognition as commissioned personnel in 1809.

The Austrian artillery reserves, bolstered by former battalion pieces and new production, matched those of the French in 1809. Additionally, despite his initial opposition, the Landwehr, a national militia, was established. Preliminary estimates indicated that Austria and Bohemia would contribute 180,000 troops, while Hungary would provide 50,000. However, the complex nature of the Habsburg Empire, characterised by national divisions and apprehensions of revolt, hindered the full utilisation of its manpower potential. In spring 1809, approximately 70 battalions were assembled and outfitted in plain grey smocks, a large black hat, and armed with a range of muskets, contributing to the war effort.

== Tactics and Equipment ==
Each Austrian battle formation consisted of two parallel lines of battalions, with each unit assigned a permanent place according to seniority. Each Treffen (line), was further subdivided into a right, centre and left wing. The right wing was commanded by the most senior general, while a junior general commanding the left wing was in charge. The deployment of infantry, supported by line guns, was standard practice in the centre, with the primary objective being massed fire. Along the wings, the primary mission of the cavalry was to prevent an enemy counterattack. A third line of battalions, the Corps de Reserve, which was usually smaller than the first two Treffen, usually formed several hundred paces to the rear.The artillery reserve guns were emplaced in positions chosen beforehand and were not generally moved during battle.

The tactics of the different combat arms were determined by regulations, modified by army commanders at the outset of a campaign. Regulations for the infantry dated to 1769 and designated the battalion as the primary manoeuvre unit. Although bayonets were fixed at all times, controlled fire was stressed. The regulations were highly detailed, categorising no less than ten types of fire for all possible, and some less likely, occasions. The primary focus was on controlled fire volley tactics.

Except for the Grenzer sharpshooters the majority of infantrymen were equipped with either the Model 1774 or Model 1784 muskets, both of which fired 18.3 mm projectiles and came with triangular bayonets. While German and Grenz units used the Fusilier sabre featuring a 43 cm blade, Hungarian infantry, Grenadiers, and all non-commissioned officers were issued the Grenadier sabre, characterized by its longer 63 cm blade. Standard gear for each soldier included a cartridge box, a haversack, a shared waterbottle for every two men, as well as a tent and a copper kettle shared among groups of five. They carried 60 rounds of ammunition individually, with an additional 36 rounds stored on the 30 packhorses assigned to each battalion. Logistics per battalion typically consisted of one wagon per company and roughly four wagons, along with a variable number of carts, to manage supplies.

== See also ==
- Imperial Army of the Holy Roman Emperor
- Army of the Holy Roman Empire
- Imperial Austrian Army (1806–1867)
- Flags of the Austrian Army during the French Revolutionary and Napoleonic Wars

For the period after 1867:

- Austro-Hungarian Armed Forces
- Austro-Hungarian Army
- Common Army
