= List of wars involving France =

This is a list of wars involving modern France from the abolition of the French monarchy and the establishment of the French First Republic on 21 September 1792 until the current Fifth Republic.

- For wars involving the Kingdom of France (987–1792), see List of wars involving the Kingdom of France.
- For pre-987 wars, see List of wars involving Francia.

French victory
French defeat
Another result *
Ongoing conflict

*e.g. a treaty or peace without a clear result, status quo ante bellum, result of civil or internal conflict, result unknown or indecisive, inconclusive

== First French Republic (1792–1804) ==
| Conflict | Allies | Opponents | Outcome |
|---|---|---|---|
| French Revolution (1789–1799) Location: France | Kingdom of France: Catholic and Royal Army; Chouans; Armée des Émigrés | Revolutionaries: Jacobins; Cordeliers; Girondins; Sans-culottes; Thermidorians | French Republican victory: Abolition of the Ancien régime and creation of constitutional monarchy; Proclamation of the French First Republic in September 1792; Reign of Terror and execution of Louis XVI; French Revolutionary Wars; Establishment of the French Consulate in November 1799 |
| War of the First Coalition (1792–1797) Location: France, Central Europe, Italy, the Low Countries, Spain, West Indies | (Constitutional Cabinet of Louis XVI) Kingdom of France (until 1792); (French First Republic) French Republic (from 1792); French satellites (Note: Including the Polish Legions formed in French-allied Italy in 1797, following the abolition of the Polish–Lithuanian Commonwealth after the Third Partition in 1795.): Batavian Republic (from 1795) (Note: The French Revolutionary Army and Dutch revolutionaries overthrew the Dutch Republic and established the Batavian Republic as a puppet state in its place.); Sister republics (Note: Various conquered Italian states, including the Cisalpine Republic from 1797); French naval allies: Spain (from 1796, naval only) (Note: Re-entered the war against Britain as an ally of France after signing the Second Treaty of San Ildefonso.) | First Coalition: Dutch Republic; (until 1795) (Note: Left the war after signing the Treaty of The Hague (1795) with France.); (Kingdom of France) French Royalists; Great Britain (Note: Including the Army of Condé); Holy Roman Empire under Austrian rule (until 1797) (Note: Nominally the Holy Roman Empire, under Austrian rule, also encompassed many other Italian states, such as the Duchy of Modena and the Duchy of Massa. Left the war after signing the Treaty of Campo Formio with France.); Portugal; Prussia (until 1795) (Note: Left the war after signing the Peace of Basel with France.); Sardinia (until 1796) (Note: Left the war after signing the Treaty of Paris with France.); Spain (until 1795); Naples (until 1796) | French victory; Treaty of The Hague, Treaty of Paris, Peaces of Basel, Treaty of Tolentino, Treaty of Campo Formio: French annexation of the Austrian Netherlands, the Left Bank of the Rhine, Savoy, and other smaller territories; Santo Domingo to France; French sister republics established; End of millennial Venetian independence |
| War in the Vendée (1793–1796) Location: West France: Maine-et-Loire, Vendée, Loire-Atlantique, Deux-Sèvres (or former provinces of Anjou, Poitou, Brittany) | (France) French Republic | Vendeans | French Republican victory |
| War of the Pyrenees (1793–1795) Location: Pyrenees | (French First Republic) French Republic | Spain; Portugal | French victory: Peace of Basel; Spain cedes Santo Domingo to France |
| Haitian Revolution (1791–1804) Location: Hispaniola Collage of the Haitian Revolution: Saint-Domingue expedition; Battle of Ravine-à-Couleuvres; Battle of Crête-à-Pierrot; Blockade of Saint-Domingue; Battle of Vertières | 1791–1793: Kingdom of France (until 1792); French Republic; 1793–1798: Spain (until 1795); St. Dominican Royalists; 1798–1801: Rigaud Loyalists; 1802–1804: France | 1791–1793: St. Dominican Rebels; Spain (from 1793); St. Dominican Royalists; 1793–1798: French Republic; 1798–1801: Louverture Loyalists; 1802–1804: Armée Indigène; United Kingdom; Great Britain (1793–1798) | Haitian victory: Reprisal massacres against French population; Establishment of the Empire of Haiti |
| French invasion of Switzerland (1798) Location: Old Swiss Confederacy | France | Switzerland | French victory: Switzerland becomes a French client state |
| War of the Second Coalition (1798–1802): Mediterranean campaign of 1798; Location: Italy, Switzerland, Southern Germany, Middle East, Mediterranean Sea, Caribbean Sea | French Republic (Spain) Spain; French client republics: Batavian Republic; (Italy) Cisalpine Republic; Helvetic Republic; (Genoa) Ligurian Republic; Co-belligerent: Mysore (Fourth Anglo-Mysore War until 1799) (Note: Napoleon Bonaparte, who wished to establish a French presence in the Middle East, planned to ally France with Mysore and even planned to defeat the British together but with Napoleon and Tipu's respective defeats, this plan was no longer possible.) | Second Coalition: Holy Roman Empire (until 1801) (Note: Nominally the Holy Roman Empire, under Austrian Habsburg rule, also nominally encompassed some other Italian states abolished in 1797, as well as other Habsburg states such as the Grand Duchy of Tuscany.): Tuscany; Bavaria; United Kingdom; Russia (until 1801); Ottoman Empire; Naples (until 1801); Portugal (until 1801); Sardinia Co-belligerent: United States (Quasi-War until 1800) (Note: An undeclared naval war between the United States and the French First Republic after Congress authorised a trade deal with Great Britain and suspended repaying French loans. Hostilities began in June 1798 and concluded in September 1800. The U.S. was never an official member of the Second Coalition.) | French victory: Trinidad, Ceylon and Malta to Britain; Parma and Louisiana to France; Tuscany to the House of Bourbon; Foundation of the Septinsular Republic; Portuguese Olivença to Spain and renamed Olivenza (Treaty of Badajoz); Reichsdeputationshauptschluss |
| Peasants' War (1798) Location: Southern Netherlands annexed by the French Republic (Note: Modern-day Belgium, Luxembourg, and German border lands) | (France) French Republic | Brigands | French Republican victory |
| Quasi-War (1798–1800) Location: Primarily Caribbean and East Coast of the United States, minor actions in Indian Ocean, and Mediterranean Sea | France | United States | Convention of 1800 |
| War of the Oranges (1801) Location: Alentejo, Portugal; Rio Grande do Sul and Mato Grosso, Brazil | Kingdom of Spain; French Republic | Kingdom of Portugal: State of Brazil | Franco-Spanish victory: Treaty of Badajoz; Question of Olivença; Territory of Brazil expanded; Portuguese territory returned, except Olivenza, and border territories, which remained in Spanish possession; France territorial guarantees in Trinidad, Port Mahon (Menorca) and Malta, as well as lands north of Brazil; Southern Spanish America loses territory to Portuguese Brazil |

== First French Empire (1804–1814, 1815) ==
| Conflict | France & allies | France's opposition | Outcome |
|---|---|---|---|
| War of the Third Coalition (1803–1806) Location: Central Europe, Italy and the Atlantic Ocean | (First French Empire) France: Batavian Republic; (Kingdom of Italy (Napoleonic)) Kingdom of Italy; (Kingdom of Etruria) Etruria; Spain; (Electorate of Bavaria) Bavaria; Württemberg; Baden | (Austrian Empire) Austria; (United Kingdom of Great Britain and Ireland) United Kingdom; (Russian Empire) Russia; Naples; (Kingdom of Sicily) Sicily; Sweden | French victory: Treaty of Pressburg |
| Franco-Swedish War (1805–1810) Location: Swedish Pomerania | (First French Empire) French Empire; Spain (until 1808); Holland; Co-belligerents: Russian Empire (1808–09); Denmark–Norway (1808–09) | Kingdom of Sweden; (United Kingdom of Great Britain and Ireland) United Kingdom; (Kingdom of Prussia) Prussia; Co-belligerents: Russian Empire (until 1807); Austrian Empire; Saxony | French victory: Sweden regains Swedish Pomerania; Sweden integrates into the Continental System |
| Siege of Santo Domingo (1805) Location: Santo Domingo, Captaincy General of Santo Domingo | France | Haiti | French victory: Beheadings of Moca |
| War of the Fourth Coalition (1806–1807) Location: Central Europe | (First French Empire) France: Confederation of the Rhine; (Kingdom of Etruria) Etruria; Holland; (Kingdom of Italy (Napoleonic)) Italy; (Kingdom of Naples) Naples; (Kingdom of Saxony) Saxony (from 11 Dec 1806); (Duchy of Warsaw) Polish Legions; (Old Swiss Confederacy) Swiss Confederation; Spain (Duchy of Warsaw) Polish rebels | Fourth Coalition: (Kingdom of Prussia) Prussia; Russia; United Kingdom; Saxony (until 11 Dec 1806); Sweden; Sicily; Septinsular Republic (from 17 June 1807) | French victory: Treaties of Tilsit; Treaty of Posen Prussia loses over half of its territory; Creation of the Duchy of Warsaw and the Kingdom of Westphalia |
| Gunboat War (1807–1814) Location: the North Sea and the Baltic Sea | (Denmark–Norway) Denmark–Norway; Co-belligerent: Russian Empire (1808–09); Supported by: (First French Empire) French Empire | (United Kingdom of Great Britain and Ireland) United Kingdom; Sweden (1808–09, 1813–1814) | Anglo-Swedish victory: Treaty of Kiel; End of Denmark–Norway; Heligoland ceded to the United Kingdom; Swedish Pomerania ceded to Denmark; Norway ceded to the King of Sweden |
| Invasion of Portugal (1807) Location: Portugal | French Empire; Kingdom of Spain | Kingdom of Portugal | Franco-Spanish victory, Portuguese mainland under joint Franco-Spanish occupation |
| Finnish War (1808–1809) Location: Finland and Sweden | Russia; France; Denmark–Norway | Sweden; United Kingdom | Russian victory: Treaty of Fredrikshamn (Sweden loses Finland, Åland, a part of Lapland and a part of West Bothnia, from which the Grand Duchy of Finland was constituted, an autonomous part of the Russian Empire.) |
| Dano-Swedish War (1808–1809) (1808–1809) Location: Scandinavia | Denmark–Norway; Co-belligerent: Russian Empire (Finnish War); Supported by: (First French Empire) French Empire | Sweden; Co-belligerent: (United Kingdom of Great Britain and Ireland) United Kingdom (Gunboat War) | Inconclusive: See § Result |
| Peninsular War (1808 (Note: Some accounts mark the 1807 Franco–Spanish invasion of Portugal as the beginning of the war .)–1814 (Note: Denotes the date of the general armistice between France and the Sixth Coalition .)) Location: the Iberian Peninsula and Southern France | (First French Empire) France: (Spain under Joseph Bonaparte) Bonapartist Spain (1807–1813); (Kingdom of Italy (Napoleonic)) Italy; Confederated States of the Rhine (1807–1813); Duchy of Warsaw; (Netherlands) Holland (1807–1810) (Note: The Dutch Brigade); Swiss Confederation | Spain; Portugal; United Kingdom | Coalition victory: Treaty of Paris; Spanish Bourbon monarchy restored; Spain regains Santo Domingo; Revolts break out in Spanish America |
| War of the Fifth Coalition (1809) Location: Central Europe, Northern Italy, and the Low Countries | (First French Empire) France: Confederation of the Rhine; Bavaria; (Kingdom of Saxony) Saxony; (Kingdom of Westphalia) Westphalia; (Kingdom of Württemberg) Württemberg; Duchy of Warsaw; Italy; (Kingdom of Naples) Naples; (Netherlands) Holland; Russia | Fifth Coalition: Austria; United Kingdom (Note: states that the contributions of coalition members aside from Austria were "rather nominal". writes that "the only real coalition to be mounted in this nominal fifth war of that name was the coalition France created against unhappy Austria; it included the key German States and Italy."); Portugal; Spain; Sardinia; (Kingdom of Sicily) Sicily; Rebel groups: Black Brunswickers (Note: in rebellion against the Confederation of the Rhine); (Tyrol (federal state)) Tyrol (Note: in rebellion against Bavaria); (Austrian Empire) Gottscheers (Note: in rebellion against France in Illyria); Italian rebels (Note: in rebellion against the Kingdom of Italy) | French victory: Various Austrian territories were ceded: Illyrian Provinces to France; Salzburg to Bavaria; West Galicia to Duchy of Warsaw; Tarnopol to Russia |
| Tyrolean Rebellion (1809) Location: Tyrol | France; Kingdom of Bavaria; Italy; Saxony | Tyrolean civilian militia (Schützen) Supported by: Austrian Empire | French victory |
| French invasion of Russia (1812) Location: Russian Empire | (First French Empire) French Empire; Duchy of Warsaw; Italy; Naples Rhine Confederation: (Kingdom of Saxony) Saxony; (Kingdom of Bavaria) Bavaria; (Kingdom of Westphalia) Westphalia; (Kingdom of Württemberg) Württemberg; (Grand Duchy of Hesse) Hesse; Berg; (Grand Duchy of Baden) Baden; Switzerland; Regiment Joseph Napoleon (Spain); French allies: Austria; Prussia | Russia; United Kingdom | Russian victory |
| War of the Sixth Coalition (1812–1814) Location: Central and Eastern Europe, the Low Countries, and France | France: Duchy of Warsaw (Note: The Duchy of Warsaw as a state was in effect fully occupied by Russian and Prussian forces by May 1813, although most Poles remained loyal to Napoleon.); Italy; Naples; Napoleonic Spain (Note: Dissolved after the Battle of Vitoria in June 1813); Confederation of the Rhine (Note: Many member states defected after the Battle of Leipzig); Denmark–Norway (1813–1814) | Original coalition: Russia; Prussia; Spain; United Kingdom; Hanover; (Grand Duchy of Mecklenburg-Schwerin) Mecklenburg-Schwerin; Portugal; Sardinia; Sicily; Sweden; After the Armistice of Pläswitz: Austria; Bavaria; After the Battle of Leipzig: (Grand Duchy of Baden) Baden; Saxony; After 20 November 1813: (Sovereign Principality of the United Netherlands) Netherlands; After January 1814: Denmark | Coalition victory |
| Hundred Days (1815) Location: France and the Netherlands | France; Naples | United Kingdom; Prussia; Austria; Netherlands; Hanover; Kingdom of France; Brunswick; Württemberg; Nassau; Tuscany; Russia; Sardinia; Switzerland | Coalition victory: Second Treaty of Paris; End of the Napoleonic Wars; Second exile of Napoleon (to the island of Saint Helena) and second Bourbon Restoration; Beginning of the Concert of Europe |

== Bourbon Restoration (1814–15, 1815–1830) ==
| Conflict | France & allies | France's opposition | Outcome |
|---|---|---|---|
| Hundred Thousand Sons of Saint Louis (1823) Location: Spain | France (Spain) Armée de la Foi | (Spain) Partisans of the Cortes | Spanish and French Bourbon royalist victory: End of the Trienio Liberal; Start of the Ominous Decade |
| Greek War of Independence (1821–1829): Battle of Navarino; Morea Expedition; Location: Ottoman Greece (present-day Greece) | Greek Revolutionaries In detail: Klephts; Armatoloi; Filiki Eteria (Note: Only in 1821); Sacred Band; Messenian Senate; Peloponnesian Senate (Note: From 1821–1823.); Senate of Western Continental Greece; Areopagus of Eastern Continental Greece; Temporary regime of Crete; Military-Political System of Samos; After 1822: First Hellenic Republic; Military support: (First Hellenic Republic) Philhellenes; Carbonari revolutionaries; Serbian revolutionaries; Romanian revolutionaries (Note: From 1821.); Russian Empire (Note: From 1826.); Kingdom of France; United Kingdom; Diplomatic support: Haiti (Note: Haiti was the first nation to recognize the independence of Greece.); United States | Ottoman Empire Supported by: Egypt; Regency of Algiers; Tripolitania; Tunis; Danubian Sich | Greek victory (Note: London Protocol (1830), London Conference (1832), Treaty of Constantinople (1832)): Independence of Greece; The Peloponnese, Saronic Islands, Cyclades, Sporades and Continental Greece ceded to the independent Greek state; Crete ceded to Egypt |
| Franco-Trarzan War of 1825 (1825) Location: Waalo, West Africa | Kingdom of France | Emirate of Trarza | French victory |
| Irish and German Mercenary Soldiers' Revolt (1828) Location: Rio de Janeiro, Empire of Brazil | Empire of Brazil; Kingdom of France; United Kingdom | Irish mercenaries German mercenaries | Revolt suppressed |
| July Revolution (July 1830) Location: Paris, Kingdom of France | Kingdom of France; Royal Guard; French Royal Army; Supported by: Ultra-royalists; Doctrinaires (factions) | Revolutionaries; Liberals; Republicans; Bonapartists; Doctrinaires (factions) | Revolutionary victory: End of Charles X's rule; Establishment of the constitutional July Monarchy; Louis Philippe I becomes new King of the French; Start of the uprisings in Belgium and Poland |

== July Monarchy (1830–1848) ==
| Conflict | France & allies | France's opposition | Outcome |
|---|---|---|---|
| Liberal Wars (1828–34): Battle of the Tagus; Location: Portugal | Liberals Supported by: Spain (1833–1834); United Kingdom; France (1832–1834); Belgian volunteers (1832–1834) | Miguelites Supported by: Spain (1832–1833); Russia; (Papal States) Catholic Church | Liberal victory: Concession of Evoramonte |
| French conquest of Algeria (1830–1903) Location: Algeria: Battle of Macta; Siege of Constantine; Battle of Mazagran; Battle of the Smala; Battle of Sidi Brahim | Kingdom of France (Bourbon) (until July 1830) Kingdom of France (Orléans) (1830–1848) Second French Republic (1848–1852) Second French Empire (1852–1870) Third French Republic (1870 onward); French Algeria; Support: Morocco (1847) | Regency of Algiers; Constantine; Titteri; Oran; Emirate of Abdelkader; Kingdom of Beni Abbas; Sultanate of Tuggurt; Kel Ahaggar; Awlad Sidi Shaykh; Various other tribal confederations Various bandits Support: Morocco (until 1844) | French victory: Pacification of Algeria |
| Belgian Revolution (1830–31) Location: The Low Countries | Belgian rebels; France (from 1831) | Netherlands | Treaty of London: Most European powers' recognition of Belgium's independence from the Kingdom of the Netherlands |
| June Rebellion (1832) Location: Paris | July Monarchy: National Guards; Regular Army | Republicans | Government victory: Uprising suppressed |
| First Carlist War (1833–1840) Location: Spain | Liberals Supported by: France; United Kingdom; Portugal (from 1834) | Carlists Supported by: Portugal (until 1834) | Liberal victory: Lord Eliot Convention; Convention of Vergara |
| Pastry War (1838–1839) Location: Veracruz, Mexico | France | Mexico | French victory |
| Uruguayan Civil War (1839–1851): Battle of Vuelta de Obligado; Location: Uruguay, Argentina, and Brazil | Colorados; Gobierno de la Defensa (since 1843); Unitarians (or anti-rosists); Corrientes (from 1839); Entre Ríos (from 1851); Santa Fe (from 1851); Empire of Brazil (since 1851); France; United Kingdom of Great Britain and Ireland; Riograndense Republic (1839–1845); Italian Redshirts | Blancos: Gobierno del Cerrito (since 1843); Federalists; Lavallejistas; Argentine Confederation (since 1839) Entre Ríos (until 1851) | Colorado victory: The Colorado Party triumphs in Uruguay.; In Argentina, Rosas is overthrown by Urquiza in the Battle of Caseros.; Argentine Unification War. |
| First Franco-Moroccan War (1844) Location: Morocco: Bombardment of Tangiers; Battle of Isly; Bombardment of Mogador | France; (France) French Algeria | Morocco | French victory: Treaty of Tangier |
| Franco-Tahitian War (1844–1847) Location: the Society Islands | (France) France; Tahitian allies | Tahiti; Huahine; Raiatea-Tahaa; Bora Bora | French victory |
| Bombardment of Tourane (1847) Location: Off Tourane (Da Nang), South Central Coast of Vietnam | France | Đại Nam | French victory |
| French Revolution of 1848 (February 1848) Location: Paris, France | Government of France: French Army; Municipal Guard | Revolutionaries: Civilian protesters; National Guard defectors | Republican victory: Abdication of King Louis Philippe; Abolition of the monarchy; Establishment of the republic under a provisional government |

== Second French Republic (1848–1852) ==
| Conflict | France & allies | France's opposition | Outcome |
|---|---|---|---|
| June Days uprising (June 1848) Location: France | French Second Republic: French Army; National Guard; Garde Mobile | Insurgents | Second Republic victory: Failure of the uprising; Adoption of the French Constitution of 1848; 1848 French presidential election |
| First Italian War of Independence (1848–1849) Location: Lombardy–Venetia and Piedmont | Austrian Empire; Kingdom of Lombardy–Venetia; (French Second Republic) French Republic; (1849) | Kingdom of Sardinia; Italian Volunteer Army; Supported by: Provisional Government of Milan; Republic of San Marco; Kingdom of Sicily; Grand Duchy of Tuscany; Duchy of Modena and Reggio; Duchy of Parma and Piacenza; Roman Republic | Austrian victory: Return to the status quo ante bellum |
| French invasion of Honolulu (1849) Location: Honolulu, Hawaii | France | (Hawaii) Hawaiian Kingdom | French victory |

== Second French Empire (1852–1870) ==
| Conflict | France & allies | France's opposition | Outcome |
|---|---|---|---|
| Soninke-Marabout War (Kombo) (1850–1856) Location: Kingdom of Kombo | (United Kingdom) British Empire; (Second French Empire) French Empire | Kingdom of the Kombo (Soninke); Marabout confederacy | French victory: Cession of Sabbajee and surrounding areas to the British; Negotiated peace between the Soninke and Marabouts arbitrated by the British |
| Taiping Rebellion (1850–1864) Location: China | Qing dynasty; Later stages: France; United Kingdom | Taiping Heavenly Kingdom; Co-belligerents: Nian rebels; Red Turban rebels (Tiandihui); Small Swords Society; Miao rebels; Black Flag Army | Qing victory |
| Bombardment of Salé (1851) Location: Salé, Morocco | (France) French Republic | Morocco | French military victory: Morocco agreed to pay 100,000 francs to the French on 29 November 1851 to avoid further conflict.; Moroccan political victory; France had desired a revolt against the governor of Salé to force repayment and avoid destruction of the city, but this did not occur. |
| Crimean War (1853–1856) Location: Crimea, North Caucasus, Balkans, Black Sea, Baltic Sea, White Sea, Far East | Ottoman Empire; France (Note: From 1854); United Kingdom (Kingdom of Sardinia) Sardinia (Note: From 1855) | Russia Greece (Note: Until 1854) | Allied victory: Russia loses the Danube Delta and Southern Bessarabia |
| Second Opium War (1856–1860) Location: China | United Kingdom; India; France; Russian Empire; United States | China | Allied victory (see § Aftermath): Kowloon Peninsula and Stonecutters Island ceded to form part of British Hong Kong; Outer Manchuria ceded to Russia |
| Siege of Medina Fort (1857) Location: Médine, present day Mali | (Second French Empire) French Empire; Khasso | Toucouleur Empire | French victory |
| Campagne de Kabylie (1857) (1857) Location: Algeria | France | Kabylie Tribes | French Victory |
| Cochinchina Campaign (1858–1862) Location: Nam Kỳ, Đại Nam | France; Spain: Spanish East Indies; Cobelligerent: United States (Bombardment of Qui Nhơn only) | Đại Nam | Franco-Spanish victory: Treaty of Saigon; Cochinchina becomes a French colony |
| Second Italian War of Independence (1859) Location: Lombardy–Venetia, Piedmont and the Austrian Littoral | France; Sardinia | Austria | Franco-Sardinian victory: Armistice of Villafranca; Sardinia annexes Lombardy from Austria, occupies and later annexes Habsburg-ruled Tuscany, Modena and Emilia, as well as Papal-ruled Romagna; France gains Savoy and Nice from Sardinia. |
| Second Franco-Mexican War (1861–1867) Location: Mexico: Battle of Puebla; Battle of Barranca Seca; Battle of San Pablo del Monte; Battle of Camarón; Battle of San Juan Bautista; Capture of Mazatlán; Battle of Acapulco; Battle of San Pedro; Siege of Mexico City | France; Mexican Empire | Mexico | Mexican Republican victory |
| Shimonoseki Campaign (1863–1864) Location: Shimonoseki, Japan | United Kingdom; France; Netherlands; United States | Chōshū Domain | Allied victory |
| French expedition to Korea (1866) Location: Predominantly Ganghwa Island, some small engagements on the Korean Peninsula | Second French Empire | Joseon dynasty | Joseon victory: French retreat; failure of punitive expedition; Korea reaffirms its isolationism |
| Garibaldis expedition to Rome (1867) Location: Near Mentana, modern Italy | France; Papal States | Italian volunteers | Franco-Papal victory |
| Franco-Prussian War (1870–71) Location: France and the Rhine Province, Prussia | Before 4 September 1870: Second French Empire After 4 September 1870: French Third Republic (Note: Under the Government of National Defense.) Redshirts | Before 18 January 1871: North German Confederation; Prussia; Saxony; Hesse; and 19 smaller states; Bavaria; Württemberg; Baden; After 18 January 1871: German Empire | German victory: End of the Second French Empire; Unification of Germany and establishment of the German Empire; German annexation of Alsace–Lorraine |

== French Third Republic (1870–1940) ==
| Conflict | France & allies | France's opposition | Outcome |
|---|---|---|---|
| Paris Commune (1871) Location: Paris | (France) French Third Republic | Communards; National Guards | Third Republic victory |
| Mokrani Revolt (1871–1872) Location: Algeria | France | Algerian rebels: Kingdom of Ait Abbas; Sultanate of Tuggurt; Algerian Zawiyas; Algerian peasantry | French victory |
| Garnier Expedition (1873–1874) Location: Tonkin | France | Vietnam; Black Flag Army | French victory |
| Annexation of the Leeward Islands (1880–1897) Location: Society Islands | France; Tahiti (French protectorate) | Raiatea-Tahaa; Huahine; Bora Bora | French victory |
| French conquest of Tunisia (1881) Location: Tunisia | France | Beylik of Tunis | French victory: Tunisia becomes a French protectorate |
| Mandingo Wars (1883–1898) Location: West Africa | France | Wassoulou Empire | French victory |
| First Madagascar expedition (1883–1885) Location: Madagascar | France | Merina Kingdom | French victory |
| Sino-French War (1884–1885) Location: Southeast mainland China, Taiwan, northern Vietnam: Battle of Fuzhou; Kep Campaign; Battle of Shipu; Battle of Zhenhai; Lạng Sơn Campaign; Siege of Tuyên Quang; Battle of Hòa Mộc; Battle of Phu Lam Tao; Battle of Bang Bo; Retreat from Lạng Sơn; Pescadores Campaign | France | China; Black Flag Army; Nguyễn dynasty | Treaty of Tientsin; China officially recognizes French domination over Vietnam |
| Tonkin Campaign (1883–1886) Location: Northern Vietnam | France | Qing dynasty Black Flag Army; Nguyễn dynasty | French victory: French protectorate over Tonkin and Annam |
| First Franco-Dahomean War (1890) Location: Ouémé Department of modern Benin | France | Dahomey | French victory: Dahomey recognizes Porto-Novo as a French protectorate and gives up customs rights to Cotonou in exchange for yearly payment |
| Second Franco-Dahomean War (1892–1894) Location: Ouémé Department and Zou Department of modern Benin: Battle of Abomey | France | Dahomey | French victory: Dahomey conquered and incorporated as a French protectorate |
| Franco-Siamese conflict (1893) Location: French Indochina, Siam | French Republic: French Indochina | Siam | French victory: Entente Cordiale; Laos ceded to French Indochina |
| First Italo-Ethiopian War (1894–1896) Location: Eritrea and Ethiopia | Ethiopia; Support: Russia; France Eritrean rebels | Italy: Italian Eritrea | Ethiopian victory: Treaty of Addis Ababa |
| Second Madagascar expedition (1894–1895) Location: Madagascar | France | Merina Kingdom | French victory |
| French intrusion into Amapá (1895) Location: Amapá, Brazil | France | Brazil | French defeat: French invasion repelled |
| Cretan Revolt (1897–1898) Location: Crete | Cretan revolutionaries Kingdom of Greece; British Empire; France (Kingdom of Italy) Italy; Russian Empire; Austria-Hungary (until 12 April 1898); German Empire (until 16 March 1898) | Ottoman Empire | French victory: Establishment of the Cretan State.; Withdraw of Ottoman forces from Crete. |
| Boxer Rebellion (1899–1901) Location: North China, Yellow Sea | Eight-Nation Alliance British Empire Russia Japan France Germany United States Italy Austria-Hungary: Netherlands; Spain; Belgium; (Qing dynasty) Mutual Defence Pact of Southeast China (after 1900) | Boxer movement; Qing dynasty (after 1900) | Eight-Nation Alliance victory: Boxer Protocol |
| Rabih War (1899–1901): Battle of Togbao; Battle of Kousséri; Location: West Africa | France | Kanem–Bornu Empire | French victory |
| 1904–1905 uprising in Madagascar (1904–1905) Location: Madagascar | France | Rebels | French victory: Rebellion suppressed |
| Ouaddai War (1909–1911) Location: Ouaddai Empire | France | Ouaddai Empire | French victory: Annexation of Ouaddai Empire |
| French conquest of Morocco (1911–1934) Location: North Africa | France: Morocco | Zaian Confederation; Varying other Berber tribes | French victory |
| Zaian War (1914–1921) Location: French protectorate of Morocco: Battle of El Herri | France: Morocco | Zaian Confederation; Varying other Berber tribes Supported during the First World War by the Central Powers | French victory |
| First World War (1914–1918) Location: Europe, Africa, Asia, Middle East, the Pacific Islands, and coast of North and South America | Allied Powers France; British Empire: United Kingdom; Canada; Newfoundland; Australia; New Zealand; India; South Africa; Russian Empire; United States; Italy; Japan; China; Serbia; Montenegro; Romania; Belgium; Greece; Portugal; Brazil | Central Powers Germany; Austria-Hungary; Ottoman Empire; Bulgaria | Allied victory: End of the German, Russian, Ottoman, and Austro-Hungarian empires; Formation of new countries in Europe and the Middle East; Transfer of German colonies and regions of the former Ottoman Empire to other powers; Establishment of the League of Nations |
| Volta-Bani War (1915–1917) Location: Burkino Faso, Mali | France: French West Africa | Marka, Bwa, Lela, Nuni, and Bobo people | French victory |
| Kaocen revolt (1916–1917) Location: Northern Niger | France: French West Africa | Tuareg guerrillas | French victory |
| Thái Nguyên uprising (1917–1918) Location: Northern Vietnam | France | Vietnamese rebels | French victory: Uprising suppressed. |
| Occupation of Constantinople (1918–1923) Location: Istanbul | United Kingdom; France; Italy; Greece; United States; Japan | Ottoman Empire | Temporary occupation |
| November 1918 insurgency in Alsace-Lorraine Location: Alsace-Lorraine | French Third Republic | Alsace-Lorraine Soviet Republic | Third Republic victory: Alsace-Lorraine annexed by France |
| Hungarian-Romanian War (1918–1919) Location: Hungary, and Transylvania | Romania; Supported by: France Czechoslovakia | Hungarian Republic (until 21 March 1919); Soviet Hungary; Supported by: Soviet Russia | Romanian victory |
| Franco-Turkish War (1918–1921) Location: Cilicia and Upper Mesopotamia: Battle of Marash; Battle of Urfa; Siege of Aintab; Karboğazı ambush; Kaç Kaç incident; Battle of Kovanbaşı; Battle of Kanlı Geçit; Battle of Fadıl | France: (Armenia) French Armenian Legion | Grand National Assembly: Kuva-yi Milliye | French loss: French influence in Anatolia is repelled; Southern Anatolia ceded to Turkey; Cilicia Peace Treaty; Treaty of Ankara; Treaty of Lausanne |
| Allied intervention in the Russian Civil War (1918–1920) Location: Russia, Mongolia, and Iran | (Russia) White Movement; British Empire: United Kingdom; Canada; Australia; India; South Africa; United States; France; Japan; Czechoslovakia; Greece; Estonia; Serbia; Italy; Poland; Romania; China | Russian SFSR; Far Eastern Republic; Latvian SSR; Ukrainian SSR; Commune of Estonia; Mongolian Communists | Allied withdrawal: Allied withdrawal from Russia; Bolshevik victory over White Army |
| German Revolution of 1918–1919 (1918–1919) Location: German Empire | 1918–1919: Weimar Republic: Reichswehr; Freikorps; Der Stahlhelm; Social Democratic Party of Germany; Supported by: France | FSR Germany; Supported by: Russian SFSR | Weimar victory |
| Hungarian–Czechoslovak War (1918–1919) Location: Slovakia, Carpathian Ruthenia, Hungary | Czechoslovakia; Supported by: France; Romania | Hungarian Republic (until 21 March 1919); Soviet Hungary (from 21 March 1919); Supported by: Soviet Russia | Czechoslovak victory: Hungarian retreat after diplomatic negotiations with the Entente; Formation and then dissolution of the Slovak Soviet Republic |
| 1919 Luxembourgish rebellion (January 1919) Location: Luxembourg | French Third Republic; Grand Duchy of Luxembourg | Comité de Salut Public (Luxembourg); Republic of Luxembourg | French and Luxembourgish monarchist victory: Luxembourgish republican and pro-Belgian rebellion suppressed (10 January 1919) |
| Polish-Soviet War (1919–1921) Location: Central and Eastern Europe | Poland; Belarusian PR; Latvia (Note: Battle of Daugavpils); Ukrainian People's Republic (Note: After 1920); Supported by: France; Hungarian Republic; Romania; Russian Whites; United Kingdom (Note: Volunteers); United States | Russian SFSR; Byelorussian SSR; Polrewkom; Ukrainian SSR | Polish victory |
| Bender Uprising (1919) Location: Tighina, Kingdom of Romania (present day Bender, Moldova) | France; Romania | Red Guards; Ukrainian SSR | Franco-Romanian victory |
| Franco-Syrian War (1920) Location: Syria: Alawite Revolt of 1919; Hananu Revolt; Battle of Maysalun; Capture of Damascus (1920) | France: French West Africa | Arab Kingdom of Syria: Arab militias | French victory: Establishment of French Mandate of Syria King Faisal expelled to Mandatory Iraq |
| Rif War (1920–1927) Location: Morocco | Spain; France (1925–1926); Jebala tribes | Republic of the Rif; Jebala tribes | Franco-Spanish victory: Dissolution of the Republic of the Rif |
| Great Syrian Revolt (1925–1927) Location: French Mandate for Syria and the Lebanon Damascus in flames as the result of the French air raid on 18 October 1925.: Capture of Salkhad; Battle of al-Kafr; Battle of al-Mazraa; Battle of al-Musayfirah; 1925 Hama uprising; Battle of Rashaya; Battle of al-Mazraa | France: Syria; Lebanon | Syrian rebels | French victory |
| Kongo-Wara rebellion (1928–1931) Location: French Equatorial Africa, French Cameroon | France: French Equatorial Africa; French Cameroon; Fula people Co-belligerents: Gbaya chiefdoms | Gbaya people and clans Co-belligerents: Mbum people Mbai people Pana people Yangere people Mbimou people Goundi people | French victory |
| Yên Bái mutiny (1930) Location: Vietnam | France: French Indochina | Việt Nam Quốc Dân Đảng | French victory: Uprising crushed VNQDĐ severely damaged by deaths and arrests, jailings and executions by French authorities |
| Second World War (1939–1945) Location: Europe, Pacific Ocean, Atlantic Ocean, Southeast Asia, East Asia, Middle East, Mediterranean, North Africa, Oceania, North and South America | Allied Powers United States; Soviet Union; United Kingdom; China; Free France; Poland; Canada; Australia; New Zealand; India; South Africa; Yugoslavia; Greece; Denmark; Norway; Netherlands; Belgium; Luxembourg; Czechoslovakia; Brazil; Mexico | Axis powers Germany; Japan; Italy; Hungary; Romania; Bulgaria; Croatia; Slovakia; Finland; Thailand; Manchukuo; Mengjiang | Allied victory: Collapse of the Third Reich; Fall of Japanese and Italian Empires; Creation of the United Nations; Emergence of the United States and the Soviet Union as superpowers; Beginning of the Cold War |

== Vichy France (1940–1944) ==
| Conflict | France & allies | France's opposition | Outcome |
|---|---|---|---|
| Franco-Thai War (1940–1941) Location: French Indochina: Battle of Ko Chang | Vichy France: French Indochina | Thailand | Inconclusive: Japanese-mediated ceasefire; On Japanese decision, disputed territories in French Indochina ceded by France to Thailand |

== French Fourth Republic (1946–1958) ==
| Conflict | France & allies | France's opposition | Outcome |
|---|---|---|---|
| War in Vietnam (1945–1946) Location: Vietnam | France; British Empire; Japanese Surrendered Personnel. | Việt Minh | Operational success: Restoration of French rule in Indochina; First Indochina War begins |
| First Indochina War (1946–1954) Location: French Indochina: Battle of Hanoi; Battle of Cao Bằng; Operation Papillon; Operation Léa; Operation Ceinture; Battle of Đông Khê; Battle of Route Coloniale 4; Battle of Vĩnh Yên; Battle of Mạo Khê; Battle of the Day River; Battle of Hòa Bình; Operation Lorraine; Battle of Nà Sản; Operation Bretagne; Operation Adolphe; Battle of Muong Khoua; Operation Camargue; Operation Hirondelle; Operation Brochet; Operation Mouette; Operation Castor; Battle of Dien Bien Phu; Operation Condor; Battle of Mang Yang Pass | French Union: France; French Indochina; State of Vietnam; Kingdom of Cambodia; Kingdom of Laos; Supported by: United States | Democratic Republic of Vietnam: (North Vietnam) Việt Minh; Supported by: China; Soviet Union | DR Vietnamese victory: Division of Vietnam between North Vietnam and South Vietnam in 1954; Independence of Vietnam, Laos and Cambodia |
| Malagasy Uprising (1947–1948) Location: Madagascar | France | MDRM | French victory: Uprising Crushed by French, various participants tried and executed; Scars on Malagasy society |
| Berlin Blockade (1948–1949) Location: West Berlin, Germany | France; United States; United Kingdom; Canada; Australia; New Zealand; South Africa | Soviet Union | Western Allied Victory: Blockade lifted; West Berlin remains under the control of the Western Allies |
| Operation Valuable (1949–1956) Location: Albania | Western Bloc: United States; United Kingdom; France; Albanian exiles NATO: Italy; West Germany (Note: Formation of the unit Company 4000); Greece; Turkey; Separatists: (Northern Epirus) KEVA Yugoslavia | Albania | Operational failure: Failure to overthrow the communist government of Enver Hoxha; 300 DGSE, MI6 and CIA agents killed and another 961 NATO agents and paramilitaries killed or captured |
| Korean War (1950–1953) Location: Korea | South Korea; United States; United Kingdom; Australia; Belgium; Canada; France; Philippines; Colombia; Ethiopia; Greece; Luxembourg; Netherlands; New Zealand; South Africa; Thailand; Turkey | North Korea; China; Soviet Union | UN Victory: Ceasefire armistice; North Korean invasion of South Korea repelled; UN invasion of North Korea repelled; Chinese invasion of South Korea repelled; Korean Demilitarized Zone established; Little territorial change at the 38th parallel border |
| Algerian War (1954–1962) Location: French Algeria: Toussaint Rouge; Battle of Philippeville; Battle of Algiers; Battle of Agounennda; Operation Jumelles; Algiers putsch of 1961; Battle of Bab El Oued | French Fourth Republic (1954–1958); French Fifth Republic (1958–1962); La Main Rouge; MPC; ANPA; FAF (1960–61); OAS (1961–62) | FLN; MNA; PCA | Algerian victory: Independence of Algeria from France; End of the French colonial empire; Collapse of the Fourth French Republic and establishment of the Fifth French Republic |
| Bamileke War (1955–1964) Location: French Cameroon | Before 1960; France: (France) French Equatorial Africa; After 1960; Cameroon; France | UPC | French-Cameroonian victory |
| Suez Crisis (1956) Location: Egypt (from the Gaza Strip to the Suez Canal) | Israel; United Kingdom; France | Egypt | Coalition military victory Egyptian political victory: Israeli occupation of the Sinai Peninsula and the Gaza Strip until March 1957 |
| Ifni War (1957–1958) Location: Spanish Sahara, Ifni, Morocco French wars since 1958 | Spain; France | Moroccan Army of Liberation | Franco-Spanish victory |

== French Fifth Republic (1958–present) ==
| Conflict | France & allies | France's opposition | Outcome |
|---|---|---|---|
| Basque conflict (1959–2011) Location: Greater Basque Country (Spain, France) | Spain: Ertzaintza; National Police Corps; Spanish Army; Civil Guard; Armed Police Corps; Anti-Terrorist Liberation Groups (GAL) (1983–1987); France: National Gendarmerie; National Police | Unaligned and anti-separatist paramilitary groups: Spanish Basque Battalion (1975–1981); Anti-Communist Apostolic Alliance (1976–1983); Spanish Armed Groups (1979–1980); Warriors of Christ the King (1968–1980); Spanish National Action (unknown); ETA Anti-Terrorism (1970s); Anti-Marxist Commandos (unknown); Falange y Tradición (2009); Basque National Liberation Movement: Euskadi Ta Askatasuna (1959–2018); Iparretarrak (1972–2000); Iraultza (1982–1996); Autonomous Anti-Capitalist Commandos (late 1970s–1980s); Irrintzi (2005–2009); Kale borroka (1990s–2000s); Hordago (1980s); Euskal Zuzentasuna (1977–1979); Supported by: Provisional IRA | Partial victory for the Spanish and French states; political gains for Basque nationalism: 2011: ETA declares definitive cessation of its armed activity; 2017: ETA fully disarms; 2018: group dissolves; Spanish and French governments maintain territorial integrity; Basque Autonomous Community regained broad self-government; Majority of Basques support peaceful political autonomy, not armed struggle |
| Bizerte crisis (1961) Location: Bizerte, Tunisia | France | Tunisia | French victory |
| Sand War (1963–1964) Location: Around the oasis towns of Tindouf and Figuig | Morocco; Support: France | Algeria; Support: Egypt; Cuba | Military stalemate: The closing of the border south of Figuig, Morocco/Béni Ounif, Algeria.; Morocco abandoned its intentions to control Béchar and Tindouf after OAU mediation.; No territorial changes were made.; Demilitarized zone established |
| Dirty War (1974–1983) Location: Argentina | Argentina: Argentine Army; Argentine Navy; Argentine Air Force; Argentine Federal Police; Argentine National Gendarmerie; Argentine Anticommunist Alliance; Justicialist Party; Supported by: United States; Bolivia; Brazil; Chile; Paraguay; Uruguay; France | ERP Montoneros; FAP Supported by: Cuba | Argentine government victory: Operativo Independencia; 1976 Argentine coup d'état; National Reorganization Process; Operation was concluded after the Falklands War |
| Western Sahara War (1975–1991) Location: Western Sahara | Morocco; Mauritania (1975–1979); France (1977–78) Operation Lamantin, aid from 1978); Supported by: Saudi Arabia; United States | (Sahrawi Arab Democratic Republic) Western Sahara: Polisario Front; Algeria; Supported by: Libya (until 1984); North Korea (from 1978) | Inconclusive: Spanish withdrawal under the Madrid Accords (1976); Mauritanian retreat and withdrawal of territorial claims |
| Angolan Civil War (1975–2002) Location: Angola | UNITA; FNLA (1975–1978); South Africa (1975–1991); Zaire (1975); Supported By; United States (1975–1991); Morocco (1970s); China (1975); FLEC; Material support: France | MPLA; Cuba (1975–1991); SWAPO (1975–1991); ANC (1975–1991); Executive Outcomes (1993–1995); FLNC (1975–2001); Namibia (2001–2002); Material support: Soviet Union (1975–1991); Yugoslavia (1975–1991); North Korea (1980s); Brazil; Mexico | MPLA Victory |
| Corsican conflict (1976–present) Location: Corsica; Violence occasionally spread to mainland France and Italy | France: French Armed Forces (1 barracks on Corsica); National Gendarmerie; National Police; Municipal Police; Anti-separatist paramilitaries: Front d'Action Nouvelle Contre l'Indépendance et l'Autonomie; Criminal groups: Corsican mafia | Corsican Separatist Paramilitaries National Liberation Front of Corsica (FLNC); FLNC-Canal Historique (FLNC-CS) (1988–1998); FLNC-Canal Habituel (FLNC-CA) (1988–1997); Resistenza (1989–2003); Fronte Ribellu (1996–1999); FLNC-5 Maghju (FLNC-5M) (1996–1999); Armata Corsa (AC) (1999–2001); FLNC-Unione di i Cumbattenti (FLNC-UC) (1999–present); FLNC-22 Uttrovi (FLNC-22U) (2002–present); Armata di U Populu Corsu (APC) (2004–2006); FLNC-5 Maghju 1976 (FLNC-1976) (2007–present); FLNC-21 Maghju (FLNC-21M) (2021–present); Other small groups | Ongoing |
| Shaba I (1977) Location: Shaba Province, Zaire | France; Zaire; Morocco; Egypt; Belgium; Supported by: United States; China; Saudi Arabia; Sudan; Nigeria | Front for the National Liberation of the Congo (FNLC); Supported by: Angola; Soviet Union; East Germany | Zairian victory |
| Chadian–Libyan conflict (1978–1987) Location: Chad | Anti-Libyan Chadian factions: FAT (1978–79); FAN (1978–83); FANT (1983–87); GUNT (1986–87); France; Zaire; Nigeria; Senegal; Supported by: Sudan; Egypt; Israel; Iraq; United States | Libya: Islamic Legion; Pro-Libyan Chadian factions: FROLINAT; GUNT (1979–86); Codos (1983–86); PLO (1987); Supported by: East Germany; Soviet Union | Chadian-French victory: Chad gains control of the Aouzou Strip |
| Shaba II (1978) Location: Shaba, Zaire | France; Zaire; Belgium; Morocco; United States; Supported by China | Front for the National Liberation of the Congo (FNLC); Supported by Angola; Cuba (alleged); Soviet Union (alleged) | Zairian victory |
| Multinational Force in Lebanon (1982–1984) Location: Lebanon | France; United States; United Kingdom; Italy | Islamic Jihad Organization; Iran; Ba'athist Syria; Progressive Socialist Party; Amal Movement | Syrian Allied victory: Multinational forces fail to prevent collapse of Lebanese Army into Syrian- or Israeli- supported militias; Multinational forces evacuated after the US embassy and US Marine barracks are bombed by the Islamic Jihad Organization; Multinational forces oversee withdrawal of Palestine Liberation Organization; Humanitarian crisis in Southern Lebanon; Civil war continues until 1990; President Hafez al-Assad continues his occupation of Lebanon until his son and later president Bashar al-Assad orders a withdrawal from the country |
| Rwandan Civil War (1990−1994) Location: Rwanda | Rwanda; Zaire (1990); France | Rwandan Patriotic Front (RPF) | Rwandan Patriotic Front (RPF) victory |
| Gulf War (1990–1991) Location: Iraq, Kuwait, Saudi Arabia and the Persian Gulf | Kuwait; United States; United Kingdom; Saudi Arabia; Egypt; France; Syria; Morocco; Oman; Pakistan; Canada; United Arab Emirates; Qatar; Bangladesh; Italy; Australia; Netherlands other allies | Iraq | Coalition victory: Iraqi forces expelled from Kuwait; Kuwaiti independence restored; Destruction of Iraqi and Kuwaiti infrastructure |
| Djiboutian Civil War (1991–1994) Location: Northern Djibouti | Djibouti; Supported by : France | FRUD | Franco-Djiboutian victory: FRUD peace accord |
| Bosnian War (1992–1995) Location: Bosnia and Herzegovina | Bosnia and Herzegovina; Herzeg-Bosnia; Croatia; Support: NATO | Republika Srpska; Serbian Krajina; Western Bosnia (from 1993); Support: FR Yugoslavia | Croatian and Bosnian victory |
| Kosovo War (1998–1999) Location: Autonomous Province of Kosovo and Metohija (then part of Serbia) | KLA; Belgium; Canada; Denmark; France; Germany; Italy; Luxembourg; Netherlands; Norway; Portugal; Spain; Turkey; United Kingdom; United States | FR Yugoslavia | NATO Victory: Kumanovo Treaty |
| War in Afghanistan (2001–2014) Location: Afghanistan: Mission Héraclès; French forces in Afghanistan; Operation Anaconda; Operation Mountain Viper; Operation Eagle's Summit; Uzbin Valley ambush; Battle of Alasay; Operation Septentrion; Operation Moshtarak | ISAF | Taliban al-Qaeda | Taliban victory: Invasion and occupation of Afghanistan; Destruction of al-Qaeda and Taliban militant training camps; Fall of the Taliban government; Establishment of the Islamic Republic of Afghanistan under the Karzai administration; Start of Taliban insurgency; Drone Strikes in the tribal areas of Afghanistan and Pakistan; Death of Osama bin Laden; Death of Mohammed Omar in July 2013; Over two-thirds of al-Qaeda's operatives killed or captured; International Security Assistance Force (ISAF) disbanded in December 2014; Commencement of Resolute Support Mission in December 2014; United States led withdrawal in August 2021; Return of Taliban régime in 2021 |
| Insurgency in the Maghreb (2002–present) Location: Maghreb, Sahara desert, Sahel: Operation Barkhane | Algeria; Mauritania; Tunisia; Libya; Mali; Niger; Chad; France; Turkey | al-Qaeda | Ongoing |
| First Ivorian Civil War (2002–2007) Location: Ivory Coast A Forces nouvelles's member caught by the French Foreign Legion in 2004 after a plundering. | Ivory Coast; Young Patriots of Abidjan militia Liberian mercenaries Supported by: Russia; Bulgaria; Belarus France; UNOIC | Forces Nouvelles de Côte d'Ivoire | Victory |
| Haitian coup d'état (2004) Location: Haiti | National Revolutionary Front for the Liberation of Haiti MINUSTAH; United States; Chile; Canada; France | Republic of Haiti | Victory |
| Chadian Civil War (2005–2010) Location: Chad | Chad; France; NMRD; JEM | Rebels; Janjaweed; Alleged support: Sudan (until 2010) | Victory |
| Somali Civil War (2009–present) Location: Somalia: Operation Atalanta; Operation Linda Nchi; Bulo Marer hostage rescue attempt | Somalia; United States; European Union | Al-Qaeda | Ongoing |
| Boko Haram insurgency (2009–present) Location: Northeast Nigeria | Nigeria; Cameroon; Chad; Niger; Turkey; Supported by: Benin; Canada; China; France; Iran; Israel; Italy; Spain; United Kingdom; United States | Boko Haram | Ongoing |
| Second Ivorian Civil War (2010–2011) Location: Ivory Coast | New Forces; Liberian mercenaries RDR; UNOCI; France | Military of Ivory Coast; Liberian mercenaries Young Patriots of Abidjan; Ivorian Popular Front | Victory |
| First Libyan Civil War (2011) Location: Libya Part of a group of six, Italian-built, Palmaria self-propelled howitzers of the Gaddafi regime's forces, destroyed by French Rafale airplanes at the west-southern outskirts of Benghazi, Libya, in Opération Harmattan on 19 March 2011.: Opération Harmattan; Operation Unified Protector | NATO: Belgium; Bulgaria; Canada; Denmark; France; Greece; Italy; Netherlands; Norway; Romania; Spain; United Kingdom; United States | Libyan Arab Jamahiriya: Armed Forces; Pro-Gaddafi militia; Foreign mercenaries | Victory: Overthrow of the Gaddafi regime; Continuation of Libyan Crisis; Escalation of interfactional violence; Which led to beginning of Second Libyan Civil War; Rise of ISIL in Libya |
| Northern Mali Conflict (2012–2022) Location: Northern Mali: Opération Serval | Government of Mali: Military of Mali; France; Turkey; ECOWAS | National Movement for the Liberation of Azawad (MNLA): Islamic Movement of Azawad | Mixed Results: Operation Serval Success; France withdrew from Mali in 2022 |
| Central African Republic Civil War (2012–2021) Location: Central African Republic French soldiers as part of Operation Sangaris, authorized in late 2013.: Opération Sangaris | Central African Republic; MINUSCA (since 2014); MISCA (2013–2014); MICOPAX (2013) France (2013–16); South Africa (2012–13); EUFOR RCA (2014–15) | FPRC; UPC; MPC | France ended support for Central African Republic in 2021. |
| Iraqi Civil War (2014–2017) Location: Iraq: Northern Iraq offensive (June 2014); Siege of Amirli; Northern Iraq offensive (August 2014); Battle of Zumar; Battle of Suq al Ghazi; Battle of Ramadi (2014–15); Battle of Baiji (2014–15); Second Battle of Tikrit (March–April 2015); Al-Karmah offensive (2015) | Iraq; CJTF–OIR: United States; France; United Kingdom; Netherlands; Australia; Jordan; Denmark | Islamic State of Iraq and the Levant | Victory |
| Opération Chammal (2014–present) Location: Iraq, Syria, Libya French Dassault Rafale of Squadron 11F prepares to land on USS Carl Vinson. Carl Vinson is deployed as part of maritime security operations and strike operations in Iraq and Syria. | France | Islamic State of Iraq and the Levant; Syria | Ongoing: French airstrikes on ISIL in Iraq and Syria; ISIL ground attacks on French special forces repelled |
| Operation Aspides (19 February 2024 – present) Location: Red Sea, Gulf of Aden, Yemen | European Union: Belgium; Estonia; Finland; France; Germany; Greece; Italy; Latvia; Netherlands; Sweden | Yemen (SPC): Yemeni Navy (SPC faction); Houthis | Ongoing |

== See also ==
- Anglo-French Wars
- Franco-Spanish War (disambiguation)
- ISIL-related terror attacks in France
- List of battles involving France (disambiguation)
- List of wars in the Low Countries until 1560
- List of wars in the southern Low Countries (1560–1829)
- Military history of France
