= Valle de Zaragoza =

Town in the Mexican state of Chihuahua

- Municipal Seat
- Valle de Zaragoza is located within Valle de Zaragoza Municipality

- Location in Mexico
- Coordinates: 27°27′26″N 105°48′39″W
- Country: Mexico
- State: Chihuahua
- Municipality: Valle de Zaragoza
- Founded: 10 December 1780
- Elevation: 1,340 m (4,400 ft)

Population (2010)
  - Total: 2,223

Valle de Zaragoza is a town in the Mexican state of Chihuahua. It serves as the municipal seat of the surrounding municipality of Valle de Zaragoza.

As of 2010, the town of Valle de Zaragoza had a population of 2,223, up from 1,871 as of 2005.

== History ==
Valle de Zaragoza was founded on 10 December 1780, as Nuestra Señora del Pilar de Conchos; it later became known as Pilar de Conchos. Its current name, given to it on 28 April 1864, honours General Ignacio Zaragoza and his defeat of the French in the Battle of Puebla of 5 May 1862.

== Notable people ==
- Francisco Avitia, singer, actor
