= List of battles of the second French intervention in Mexico =

The French intervention in Mexico (1862–1867) was an invasion of the Republic of Mexico by the army of the Second French Empire in 1862. It resulted in the establishment of the Second Mexican Empire in 1864, which was supported by many conservative Mexicans, under the Austrian Maximilian I of Mexico. Although the empire established control of the center of the country, the republicans held out in the North and South. With the end of the American Civil War, the United States lent its support to the republicans and put pressure on the French to withdraw in 1866. The imperial forces fought on, but were defeated in a series of battles, with the republicans regaining control of the City of Mexico on 15 May 1867. Maximilian was captured and then executed on 19 June 1867. History records show that there were all in all 1,020 minor or major battles and sieges in the intervention.

== Battles and sieges ==
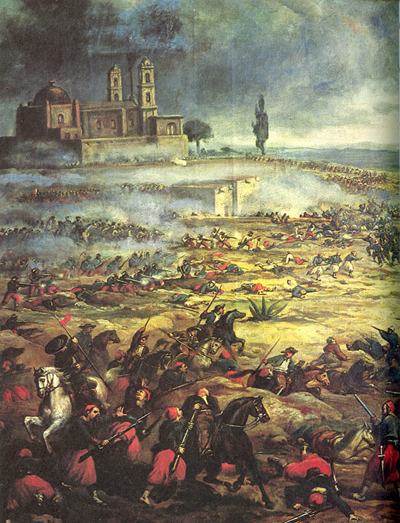
Battle of Puebla (5 May 1862)

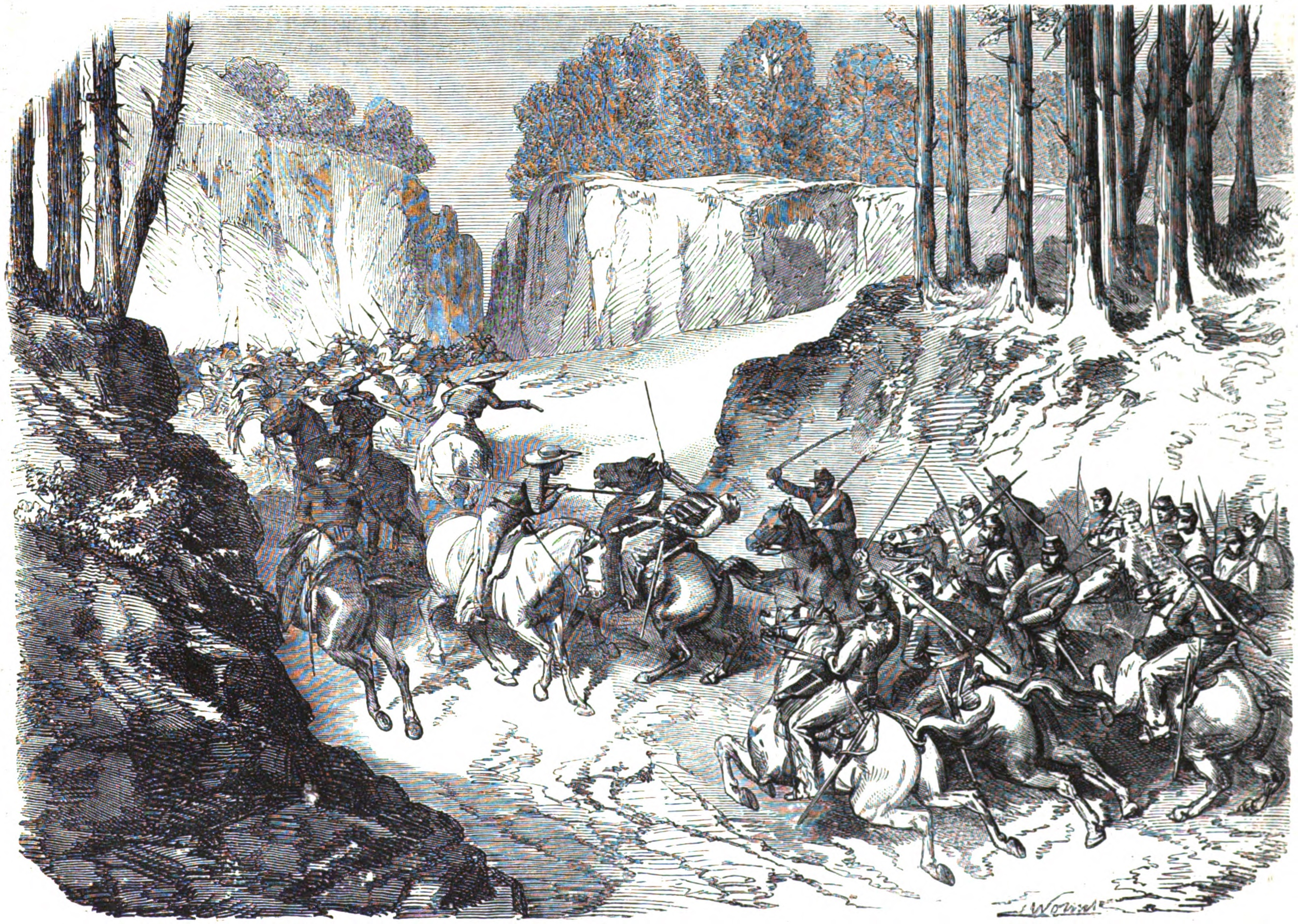
Battle of San Pablo del Monte (5 May 1863)

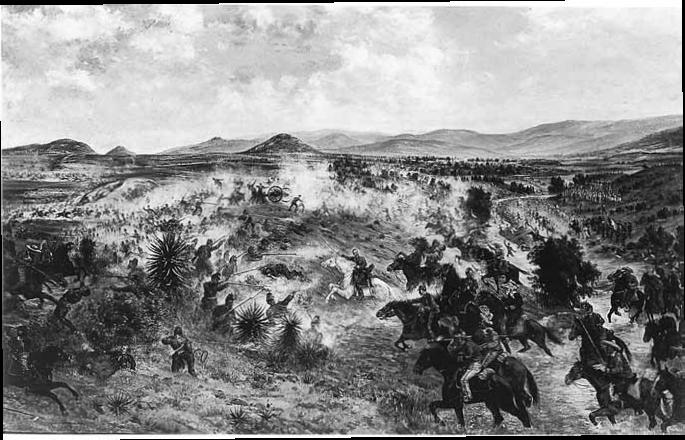
Battle of Miahuatlán (3 October 1866)

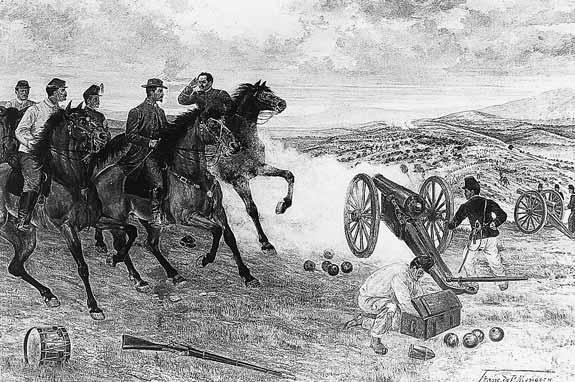
Battle of La Carbonera (18 October 1866)

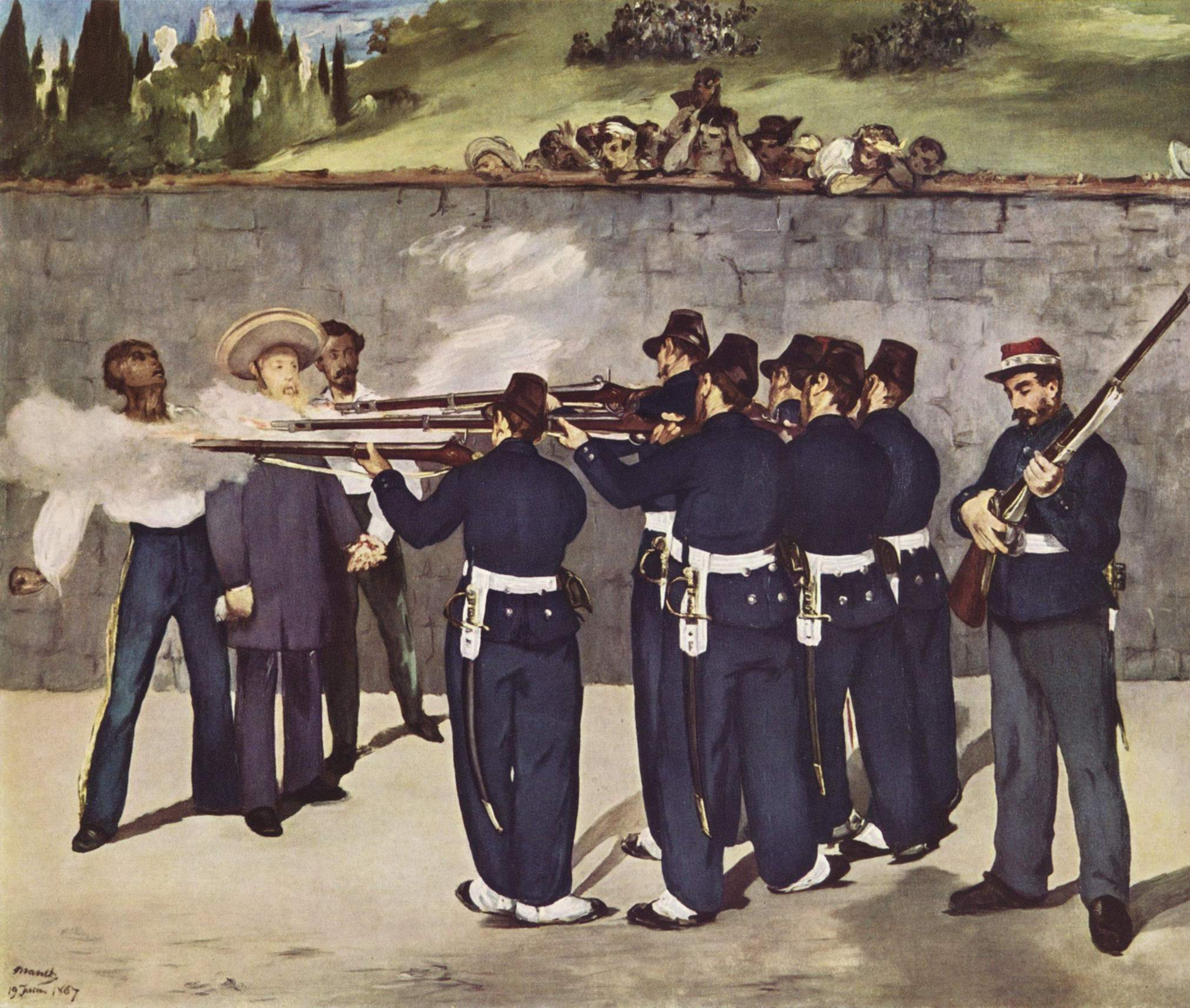
The Execution of Emperor Maximilian by Édouard Manet

Name	Start date	End date	Won by
Fall of Acapulco	1864-06-03	1864-06-03	French
Battle of Álamos	1865-09-24	1865-09-24	Local militants
Battle of Atlixco	1862-05-04	1862-05-04	Republicans
Battle of Bagdad	1866-01-04	1866-01-04	Republicans
Battle of Barranca Seca	1862-05-18	1862-05-18	French
Battle of Camarón	1863-04-30	1863-04-30	Republicans
Fall of Campeche	1864-01-22	1864-01-22	French
Battle of La Carbonera	1866-10-18	1866-10-18	Republicans
Battle of Cerro del Borrego	1862-06-13	1862-06-13	French
Battle of Chiapa de Corzo	1863-10-21	1863-10-21	Republicans
Fall of Chihuahua (1865)	1865-08-15	1865-08-15	Empire
Battle of Chihuahua (1866)	1866-03-24	1866-03-24	Republicans
Fall of the City of México (1863)	1863-06-10	1863-06-10	French
Fall of the City of México (1867)	1867-04-12	1867-06-21	Republicans
Fall of Colima	1864-11-05	1864-11-05	Empire
Battle of Cuauhtémoc	1865-02-02	1865-02-02	Empire
Fall of Durango	1864-07-04	1864-07-04	Empire
Battle of El Jahuactal	1863-11-01	1863-11-01	Republicans
Battle of El Rosario	1865-04-27	1865-04-27	Indecisive
Battle of Fortín	1862-04-19	1862-04-19	French
Fall of Guadalajara (1864)	1864-01-05	1864-01-05	French
Fall of Guadalajara (1867)	1867-01-14	1867-01-14	Republicans
Battle of Guanajuato	1863-12-08	1863-12-08	French
Battle of Guayabo	1866-11-10	1866-11-10	Republicans
Battle of Ixmiquilpan	1865-09-25	1865-09-25	Republicans
Battle of Jiquilpan	1864-11-22	1864-11-22	French
Fall of Jonuta (1863)	1863-02-21	1863-02-21	French
Siege of Jonuta (1866)	1866-04-17	1866-04-17	Republicans
Battle of Juchitán	1866-09-05	1866-09-05	Republicans
Battle of Las Cumbres	1862-04-28	1862-04-28	French
Battle of la Loma	1865-07-16	1865-07-16	Belgian
Battle of las Lomas de San Lorenzo	1867-04-15	1867-04-15	Republicans
Battle of Majoma	1864-08-20	1864-08-20	French
Battle of Mazatlán	1864-03-26	1864-03-31	Inconclusive
Fall of Matamoros	1864-09-21	1864-09-21	Empire
Battle of Miahuatlán	1866-10-03	1866-10-03	Republicans
Fall of Morelia	1863-11-30	1863-11-30	French
Battle of Nanahuatipam	1864-08-10	1864-08-10	Republicans
Fall of Monterrey	1864-08-29	1864-08-29	Empire
Siege of Oaxaca	1864-10-05	1864-10-30	Republicans
Siege of Oaxaca	1864-10-30	1865-02-08	French
Siege of Oaxaca (1867)	1867-00-00	1867-03-16	Republicans
Battle of Parral (1865)	1865-08-08	1865-08-08	Republicans
Battle of Puebla	1862-05-05	1862-05-05	Republicans
Siege of Puebla (1863)	1863-03-16	1863-05-17	French
Fall of Puebla (1867)	1867-04-02	1867-04-02	Republicans
Siege of Querétaro	1867-03-06	1867-05-15	Republicans
Battle of San Jacinto (1867)	1867-02-01	1867-02-01	Republicans
Fall of San Juan Bautista	1864-02-27	1864-02-27	Republicans
Battle of San Lorenzo	1863-05-08	1863-05-08	French
Battle of San Pablo del Monte	1863-05-05	1863-05-05	French
Battle of San Pedro	1864-12-22	1864-12-22	Republicans
Battle of Santa Gertrudis	1866-06-16	1866-06-16	Republicans
Battle of Santa Isabel	1866-03-01	1866-03-01	Republicans
Battle of Tacámbaro	1865-04-11	1865-04-11	Republicans
Battle of Tampico	1863-01-19	1863-01-19	Republicans
Battle of Totoapan	1864-10-18	1864-10-18	Republicans
Battle of Villa de Álvarez	1867-01-29	1867-01-29	Republicans
