= Rodolfo de Anda =

Mexican actor (1943–2010)

- Born: July 6, 1943; Mexico City, Mexico
- Died: February 1, 2010 (aged 66); Aguascalientes, Mexico
- Occupation: Actor
- Years active: 1955–2008
- Height: 6 ft 2 in (188 cm)

Rodolfo de Anda (July 6, 1943 – February 1, 2010) was a Mexican actor most well known for his roles in the film La gran aventura del Zorro and the television series El Pantera. He was born in Mexico City.

== Life and career ==
Rodolfo de Anda was the son of producer, director, actor Raul de Anda. His son is Rodolfo de Anda, Jr. and his brothers include producer Raul de Anda Jr. and director, actor Gilberto de Anda.

He began his acting career in the mid–1950s. De Anda’s IMDB listing has over 150 acting entries both in film and on television beginning with La venganza del Diablo and Echenme al gato. De Anda also starred in many Mexican western films known as rancheras particularly in the 1960-70s, including El zurdo and its sequel Un hombre peligroso.

In 1999, he played General Ampudia in “One Man's Hero” starring Tom Berenger and, Prince Albert of Monaco.

== Death ==
Rodolfo de Anda died February 1, 2010, from complications of diabetes and thrombosis following a stroke the week earlier.
