= Battle of Miahuatlán =

Coordinates: 16°19′0″N 96°35′0″W

- Part of the Second French intervention in Mexico
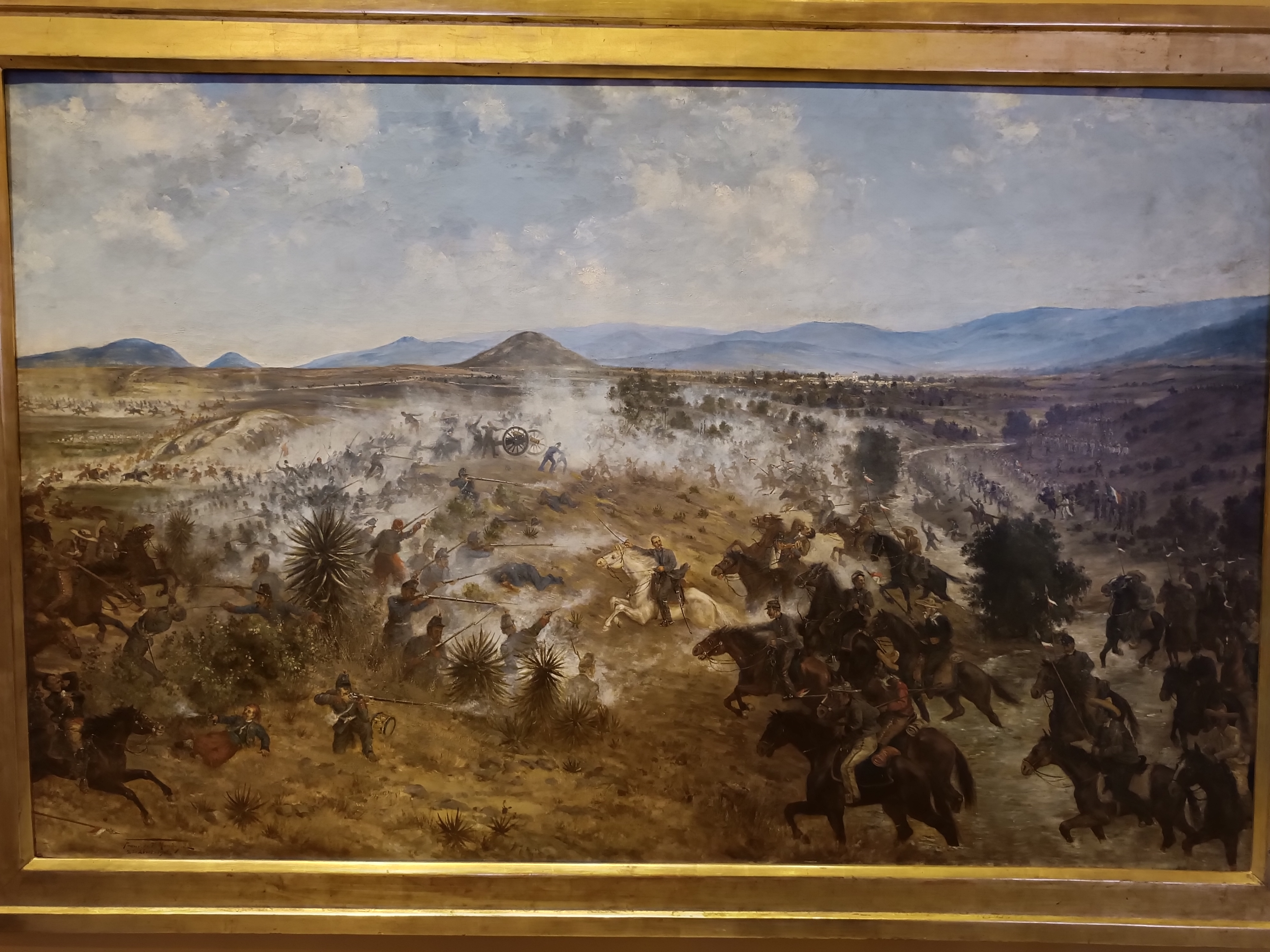
- Battle of Miahuatlán
Date	3 October 1866
Location	Miahuatlán de Porfirio Díaz, Oaxaca, Mexico
Result	Republican victory

Belligerents
(Mexico) Mexican republicans	Mexican Empire

Commanders and leaders
Porfirio Díaz	Carlos Oronoz

Strength
880	1,400

Casualties and losses
59 killed 14 wounded	70 killed 400 captured 2 guns captured

The Battle of Miahuatlán took place on 3 October 1866 in the vicinity of the current municipality of Miahuatlán de Porfirio Díaz in the state of Oaxaca, Mexico. It was fought between elements of the Mexican republican army under General Porfirio Díaz and troops of the Second Mexican Empire during the Second French intervention in Mexico.

The Imperial troops were defeated, opening the way for Díaz to advance on the city of Oaxaca.

== Background ==
Napoleon III, announced his plans on withdrawing his troops from the Second French Intervention in Mexico in January 1866, and the Second Mexican Empire he had set up began to collapse in the wake of the French withdrawal. At the time of the Battle of Miahuatlán, General Porfirio Díaz had escaped French captivity and was advancing from the south towards the city of Oaxaca, his hometown, and former headquarters .

== Battle ==
Díaz's forces at Miahuatlán were almost out of food and ammunition, drenched by rain and demoralized.

He took a defensive position facing northwest, where he was found and attacked by 1,100 Imperial troops under General Carlos Oronoz assisted by a French officer, Enrique Testard. The attackers bombarded the republican positions from long range, then closed in on them with a skirmishing line followed by three columns. Díaz skillfully held off the attackers, then sent his cavalry across the Miahuatlán river to unexpectedly attack the right rear of the Imperial troops. Facing certain defeat, General Oronoz fled the battle. His forces lost 70 dead and 400 prisoners, against Republican losses of 59 killed and 14 wounded.

The victory was due to Díaz's imaginative use of terrain and deception. He placed riflemen in the Nogales Ravine, and a group of armed peasants in a maguey field opposite them, hidden from view. Díaz then made himself conspicuous on the crest of a hill behind them. His cavalry retreated towards Díaz pursued by the imperial forces, who were caught in a lethal cross-fire from the concealed republican troops.

While Díaz launched a frontal assault led by Manuel González (later to become President of the Republic) on the imperial forces, the surprise cavalry attack from rear decided the day.

== Aftermath ==
As a result of the battle, Díaz's forces were replenished with about 1,000 captured rifles, two field pieces and over 50 mules loaded with ammunition. He was able to continue his advance with little opposition, reaching Oaxaca on 8 October 1866.

In his memoirs, Díaz described the battle as the most strategic and brilliantly fought action during the Second French intervention in Mexico. This victory, and that of the Battle of La Carbonera, gave Díaz national fame and would solidify him as a hero of the war for many decades.

== See also ==
- List of battles of the French intervention in Mexico
