= The Great Adventure of Zorro =

1976 film

- Directed by: Raúl de Anda
- Written by: Raúl de Anda
- Starring: Rodolfo de Anda; Carlos León; Carlos López Moctezuma; Jorge Mateos; José L. Murillo; Jorge Russek
- Release date: June 19, 1976
- Running time: 82 minutes
- Language: Spanish
- Box office: 41.6 million tickets (USSR)

The Great Adventure of Zorro (original Mexican title: La gran aventura del Zorro) is a 1976 film starring Rodolfo de Anda in a Mexican version of Zorro, directed by Raúl de Anda and featuring such actors as Helena Rojo and Pedro Armendáriz, Jr.

== Plot ==
The De La Vegas are a wealthy and prestigious family known throughout the territory. When the youngest son of Don Alejandro de La Vega (Monteczuma), Diego (Rodolfo de Anda), returns from his 4 year stay in Spain, he finds his hometown oppressed by the corrupt military forces. The farmers are being run out of their homes and their land is being used as military camps and/or sold off to pay for military supplies and wages, along with taking the poor villagers and using them as slaves.

The Film starts off with the Zorro character in place and does not show a transformation or origin story other than a brief prelude where Don Diego de la Vega tells his handy sidekick, Kino why he dawns the Zorro persona, (who in other versions is referred to as Bernardo or Felipe, specifically the A&E version starring Duncan Reghr) who is also the households butler, and most think is deaf and mute, but shares his secret with Don Diego/Zorro.

Zorro has multiple face offs with the local military and swears to restore order and freedom to the oppressed. However to most, Zorro is nothing but a myth. When the eldest son of Don Alejandro plans to wed the daughter (Helena Rojo) of a fellow wealthy caballero, her father plans to sell his mansion and retire. A buyer emerges (played by Pedro Amendariz Jr) and befriends both families. Upon sealing the deal, he kills the caballero and mortally wounds the elder De la Vega, leaving with the money. He then marks the carriage and surrounding area with the infamous "Z" that Zorro has adapted and is known for. A series of crimes using his own version of the Zorro outfit/mask and impersonating him cause the local towns people to turn on the Zorro. The military starts linking clues together and leads their search right back to the De La Vega's Mansion.

This begins a massive manhunt for the man named "Zorro" which sets out the "real" Zorro to avenge his brothers potential death, the caballeros death, and clear his name, and find out who is sabotaging him.

== Cast ==
- Rodolfo de Anda as Diego De La Vega / El Zorro
- Helena Rojo as Helena
- Pedro Armendáriz Jr. as Emilio Walter
- Ricardo Carrión as Pedro de Vega
- Jorge Arvizu as Kimo
- Carlos López Moctezuma as Don Francisco
- Jorge Russek as Capitán

== Reception ==
The movie was a massive hit in Mexican Cinema. During the time of its release, Rodolfo de Anda, who portrays The Zorro/Diego de La Vega character, was in the prime of his career and was known for Mexico's version of 'Spaghetti Westerns'. The Movie is Western and the first to portray the Zorro character in such fashion, deviating from the clumsy, lazy or uninterested Diego de La Vega that other films portray. In this version, Diego de la Viego is a 'fiery' and educated character with a short fuse who at one point even calls out the local military leader (Jorge Rusek) to a duel. He suggests to his father that the people should revolt against military rule but holds back just enough so people would not imagine him and Zorro being the same person. Because of this, the reception was greater than expected. At the time, Clark Kent (Super Man), Bruce Wayne (Batman), were big hits in Latin America but portrayed their alter ego's as weak and push overs, hence separating itself from other films of its Genre at the time.

It was also a major hit in the Soviet Union, where it sold 41.6 million tickets at the box office in 1977.
