= Valle de Zaragoza Municipality =

Municipality in the Mexican state of Chihuahua

Valle de Zaragoza
- Municipality
- Coat of arms

- Municipality of Valle de Zaragoza in Chihuahua

- Location in Mexico
- Coordinates: 27°27′26″N 105°48′39″W
- Country: Mexico
- State: Chihuahua
- Municipal seat: Valle de Zaragoza

Population (2010)
  - Total: 5,105

Valle de Zaragoza is one of the 67 municipalities of Chihuahua, in northern Mexico. The municipal seat lies at Valle de Zaragoza.

As of 2010, the municipality had a total population of 5,105, up from 4,341 as of 2005.

== Geography ==
As of 2010, the town of Valle de Zaragoza had a population of 2,223. Other than the town of Valle de Zaragoza, the municipality had 156 localities, none of which had a population over 1,000.
