= Battle of La Carbonera =

1866 battle in Mexico

Coordinates: 17.3833°N 96.9333°W

- Part of Second French intervention in Mexico
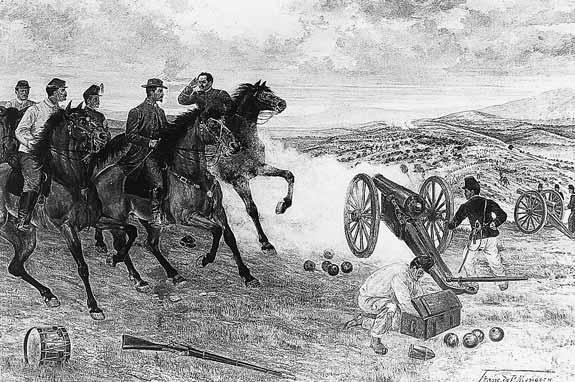
- Battle of La Carbonera
Date	18 October 1866
Location	Oaxaca, Oaxaca, Mexico
Result	Mexican Republican victory

Belligerents
(Mexico) Mexican Republic	Mexican Empire

Commanders and leaders
Porfirio Díaz	Unknown

Strength
3,000	1,500

Casualties and losses
78 killed 153 wounded	500 captured

The Battle of La Carbonera was fought on 18 October 1866 during the Second French intervention in Mexico.

== Background ==
Having triumphed over the Imperial forces in the Battle of Miahuatlán, the Republican General Porfirio Díaz besieged the city of Oaxaca, defended by the conservative General Carlos Oronoz. The siege lasted about 11 days until Díaz learned that a column of 1,500 Mexican, French and Austrian soldiers were approaching from the north. On 16 October Díaz broke off the siege of Oaxaca and marched to fight the relieving Imperial army. The next day he was reinforced at San Juan del Estado by General Luis Pérez Figueroa's brigade. Díaz's army then marched northeast to the town of Etla, arriving at a hilltop area known as La Carbonera.

== Battle ==
Díaz placed his younger brother Felix in command of the Ixtlan National Guard, which fought in the vanguard. Figueroa's brigade was deployed on the right, the Chiautla and Cazadores Battalions under Colonel Juan Espinosa in the center and González's brigade on the left. The cavalry were held in reserve in the rear, along with the Tlaxiaco militia and some artillery.

The two forces made contact around noon on 18 October. After marshaling on a nearby hill, the enemy attacked in two columns despite being outnumbered by two to one. The attacks were repulsed, and the two armies closed into general combat. After a relatively short struggle, the Austro-Imperial right was outflanked and their army disintegrated. By late afternoon, the enemy had been routed. Republican casualties were 78 killed and 153 wounded. Díaz took 500 Austrian prisoners in this battle.

== Results ==
In addition to total victory, the troops of General Porfirio Díaz won a major prize in arms, ammunition and horses, which allowed them to completely rearm. The battle was decisive, opening the way to Puebla and Mexico City.

== See also ==
- List of battles of the French intervention in Mexico
