= El zurdo =

- Directed by: Arturo Martínez
- Written by: Raúl de Anda
- Produced by: Raúl de Anda Serrano
- Starring: Rodolfo de Anda
- Cinematography: Fernando Colín; Raúl Domínguez
- Edited by: Federico Landeros
- Music by: Enrico C. Cabiati
- Production company: Estudios América
- Distributed by: Radeant Films
- Release date: July 4, 1965 (Mexico)
- Running time: 90 minutes
- Country: Mexico
- Language: Spanish

El zurdo (English: The Left-Handed) is a 1965 Mexican drama film directed by Arturo Martínez and starring Rodolfo de Anda, Germán Robles, Andrés Soler, Noé Murayama and special performances by Ofelia Montesco, Francisco Avitia, and Irma Serrano "La Tigresa".

== Cast ==
- Rodolfo de Anda as Pedro "El zurdo"
- Ofelia Montesco as Victoria
- Francisco Avitia as Pancho
- Irma Serrano "La Tigresa" as Catalina
- Andrés Soler as Padre Gil
- Germán Robles as Nazario
- Noé Murayama as Modesto
- Pepito Velázquez as Mario
- Pedro Weber "Chatanuga" as Mario's Father
- Manuel Tamés "Regulo" as Donkey Owner
- Martha Flores as Waitress
- José L. Murillo as Horse Race Judge
- Eduardo Lugo as Pancracio
- Emilio Garibay as Bettor
- Celia Tejeda as Pancho's Wife
- Antonio Padilla "Picoro" as Horse Race Announcer
- Mario Sevilla as Poker Player (uncredited)
- Jesús Gómez as Bettor (uncredited)
- Victorio Blanco as Bettor (uncredited)
