= Francisco Avitia =

Mexican singer and actor

- Born: Francisco Avitia Tapia; 13 May 1915; Valle de Zaragoza, Chihuahua, Mexico
- Died: 29 June 1995 (aged 80) Cuauhtémoc, D.F., Mexico
- Genres: Ranchera, corrido
- Occupations: Singer, actor
- Instrument: Vocals
- Years active: 1950–1995
- Labels: RCA Víctor Mexicana, Orfeón

Francisco Avitia Tapia (13 May 1915 – 29 June 1995), commonly known as "El Charro Avitia", was a Mexican singer, primarily of ranchera and corrido genres. His best known songs include "Maquina 501," "Caballo alazán lucero," and "El Muchacho Alegre". He also acted in films such as Primero soy mexicano (1950) and El zurdo (1965). Avitia was born in Pilar de Conchos (Valle de Zaragoza), Chihuahua, and at the age of six his family moved to Ciudad Juárez. He died from cardiac arrest in a Mexico City hospital at the age of 80.

== Filmography ==
- Primero soy mexicano (1950)
- If I Were Just Anyone (1950)
- The Masked Tiger (1951)
- The Spot of the Family (1953)
- La venganza del Diablo (1955)
- Sed de amor (1959)
- El zurdo (1965)
- Variedades de media noche (1977)
- Viva México (1977)
