= Battle of San Juan Bautista =

- Part of the Second French intervention in Mexico
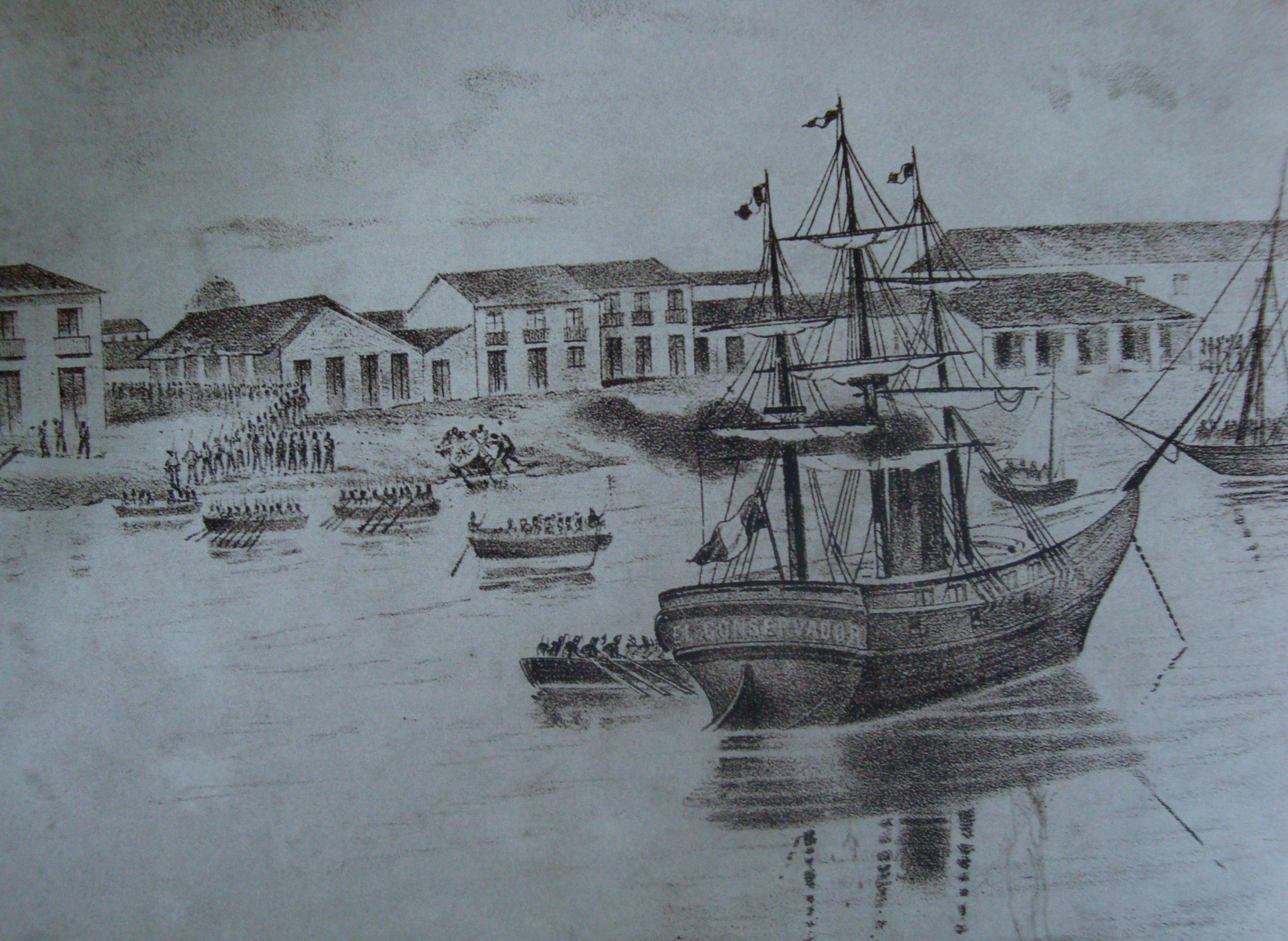
- French evacuation at San Juan Bautista
Date	February 27, 1864
Location	San Juan Bautista, Mexico
Result	Mexican Republican victory

Belligerents
French Empire (Mexico) Mexican Empire	(Mexico) Mexican Republicans

Commanders and leaders
Eduardo González Arévalo; Manuel Diaz de la Vega; Gabriel Escoffié; Antonio Castillo †	Gregorio Méndez; Andrés Sánchez Magallanes; Lino Merino; Pedro Fuentes; Narciso Sáenz

Units involved
French Navy city garrison Martinican volunteers	liberal Tabasco Army (see details)

Strength
700 several ships	1,100

Casualties and losses
4 dead 19 injured	13 dead 11 injured

The Battle of San Juan Bautista was a battle in the Second French intervention in Mexico fought on February 27, 1864. Mexican Republicans were victorious and retook control of the city. The Republican forces consisted only of the Tabasquian militia from the surrounding areas ranging between 300 and 1,100 men, only half of whom were equipped with firearms the others fought with machetes.

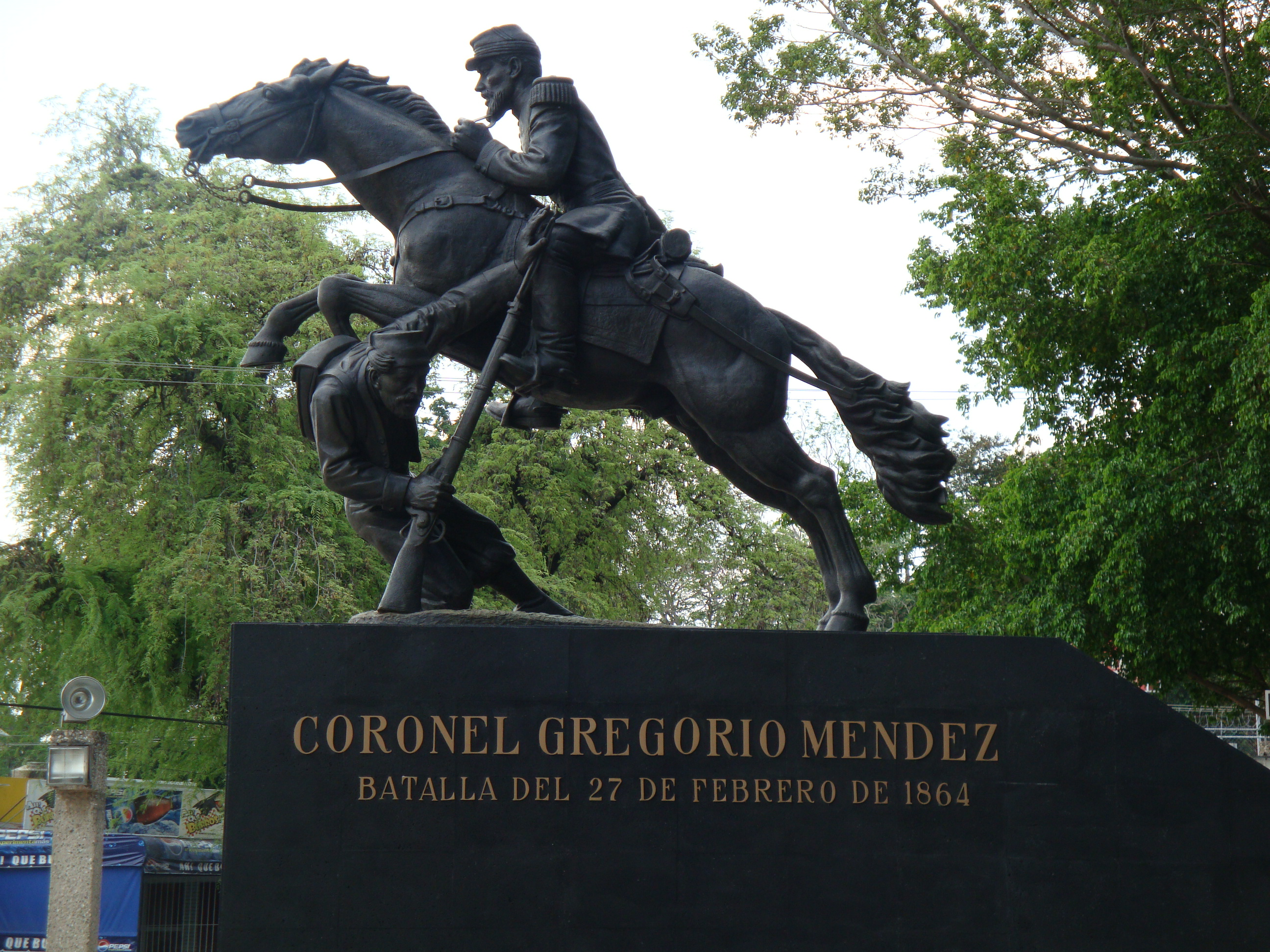
Monument in honor of the battle depicting Gregorio Méndez

San Juan Bautista, Capital of Tabasco was seized by the Imperialist forces on June 13, 1863, by General Marin Dating from December 2, 1863, the Republican forces started attacking the state capital from several points. Second Lieutenant Juan Morales with 30 men stood on the banks of Tinto, cut off all communication with San Juan Bautista and recruited soldiers, commander Narciso Sáenz positioned himself in San Juan Buenavista with his forty volunteers from Cunduacán and the national guard of Cárdenas, Colonel Lino Merino in Pueblo Nuevo de las Raices and Colonel Pedro Fuentes in Mazaltepec. From these points, Republicans began attacking the French in the state capital.

On January 1, 1864, Don Pedro Fuentes along with three dragoons broke into the Esquipulas church and rang its bells in defiance to the enemy fire, and following a brief shootout, returned unharmed to his camp. On the 3rd he reached the plazuela del Águila driving away some French. On the 7th Commander Narciso Sáenz prepared to march 400 infantry and 60 cavalry and a mountain cannon from Mazaltepec, and settled in Tierra Colorada on the 9th, Pedro Fuentes moved to Atasta, meanwhile Lino Merino and Juan Morales unified their forces and established headquarters in Mazaltepec.

At three in the morning on the 14th the Zaragoza section (the right), waded through a forest track to arrive directly on the left flank of the main square, taking positions in the La Punta district, the companies 1st, 2nd "Hidalgo" and auxiliaries from Juchitan, marched to join the Valle section in Tierra Colorada, which would occupy the bottom of the street Loma de los Perez, which was at the French right flank. At five o'clock in the morning, after a cavalry reconnaissance, the Republican center was detached on the National Road, to take up positions against the French center, covered by the mountain artillery composed of three pieces, two from the 4th and one from the 3rd. The rear guard was defended by a line of siege artillery behind them. The reserve constituted of the Castillo section in the Campo Santo, at the bottom of the hill of the same name.

The Mexican scout cavalry was discovered at the gates of the city by the French vanguard commanded by the former commander Antonio Castillo. The first series of shots wounded two of the Mexican lancers. The events quickly turned against the defenders whereas the cavalry company completely disrupted the Imperialist garrison, four soldiers and commander Castillo were left dead, nine taken prisoners, including an officer, who was condemned to death by martial laws.

The Imperialists concentrated the defense of San Juan Bautista around the "Principal" and the Governor's House that were barricaded and perforated with loopholes from top to bottom. These buildings were adjacent to the Comercio Street, which prolonged the trenchline squarewise. These blocks was linked internally by tunnels whose exit led to the Comercio Street. The house north of the market, which had walls pierced with loopholes onto the Esquipulas Street was occupied by the Republican center.

The first defense line was formed by buildings and trenches, with the exception of the Romano tradehouse on the Aurora street, which was equipped by light weapons. The second line were trenches, comprising four blocks immediately to the river, and besides that, the last line followed the flow of the Grijalva and Jícaro rivulets, connecting all together by ditches and exterior walls defended by loopholes. The Republican Army fully sealed the siege on the town starting from January 18 and installed five of the smaller culverins and two 24 pounder cannon around San Juan Bautista. The besieged were entrenched in the streets, along the coast, under the covering protection of two French steam gunships La Tourmente and La Pique; the Pailebot Pizarro, the steamboats Corina, Aurora and Diana and the steam gunships Conservador and Guaraguso, from the Mexican side.

Eduardo González Arévalo's troops counted 350 Mexican riflemen, and about 250 French marines. On the first days of the siege the beleaguered Imperialists made some breakout attempts, without any significant egress. It is worth to note that during the siege more Imperialist soldiers were wounded by machete cuts than gunshots. On January 19, General Manuel Diaz de la Vega as the newly appointed Imperial Governor of the Regency and surrogate of Arévalo was transported to San Juan Bautista from la Frontera by Conservador and Guaraguso on the river. His convoy was attacked by a band of 30 liberals whereas some Imperialist were injured among them was their Captain Gabriel Escoffié. Immediately, on the 20th, the new imperial governor requested the surrender of the Republicans by offering guarantees and compensations. He was declined and subsequently a clash broke out between the Republican center and the besieged ones. Commander Francisco Ramírez repelled the sneak attack and took 18-20 prisoners who were deported to Atasta. On February 5, the garrison received a reinforcement of 280 creole soldiers from Martinique, while on 12th about 50-60 retreating Imperialist soldiers from Palenque led by Pedro Pocurrul sought refuge at Vega's camp.

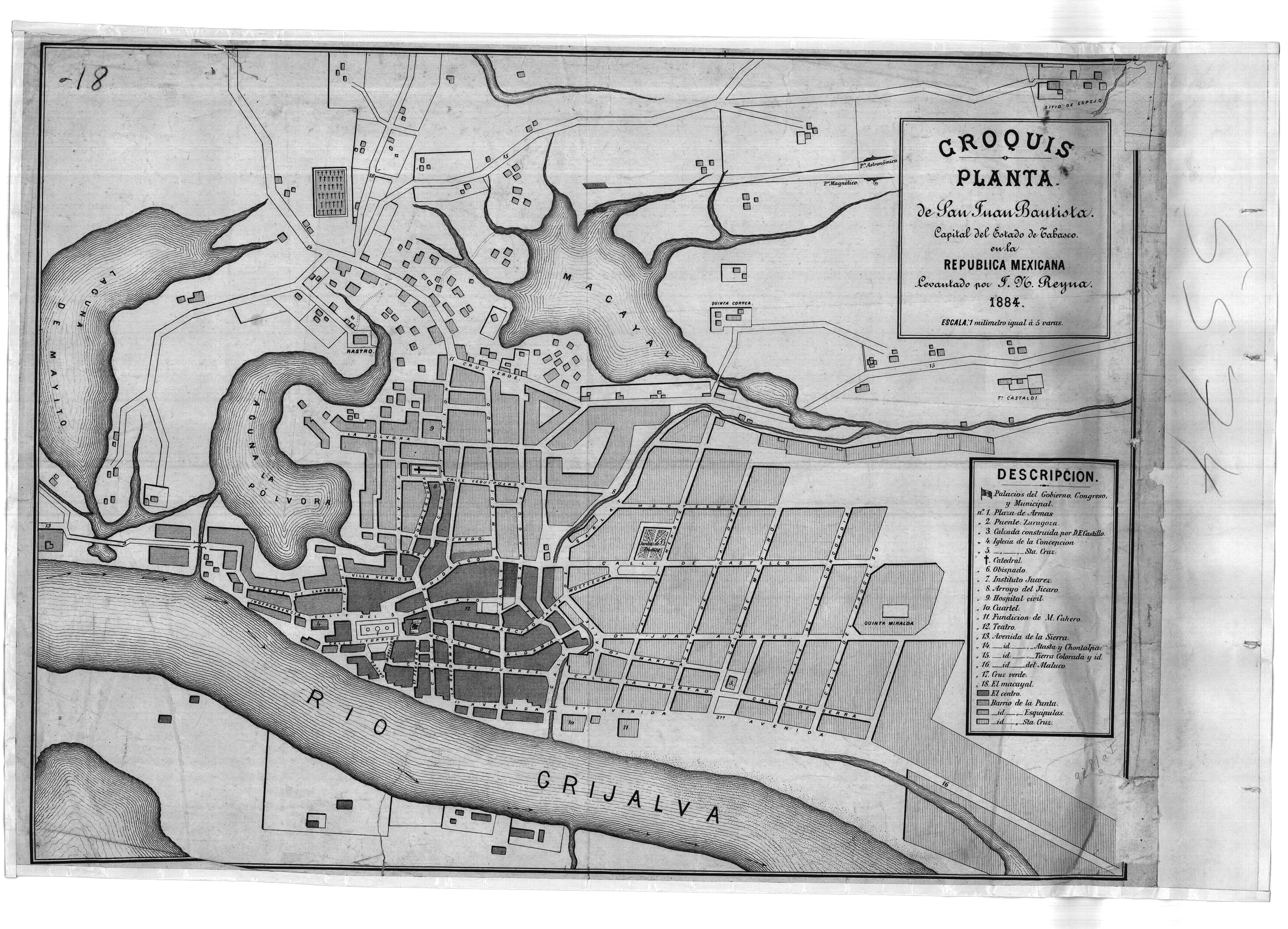
High resolution contemporary map of San Juan Bautista (note that some streets were renamed after the reoccupation)

The Republicans advanced forward house by house in close fights as the French was tearing down the buildings while retreating. The Republicans, with a 24 pounder bombard hit the Tourmente nine times until they ran out of ammunition. They collected the cannonballs of the enemy fire from the ground to recharge their own battery. When the Republicans reached the fortified houses and barricades of the defenders, the French considered to give up the city. On February 11, 1864, Tabasco forces begin an assault on "The Principal" where there were entrenched French troops. From three o'clock the Zaragoza section was ordered to advance in order to cut the enemy from the "casa de Paillet". While this was taking place, two sections of Cardenás raided the house. Under the covering fire by the Zaragoza section the Castillo guerrillas attacked the French guardpost at the entrance. The assault lasted over an hour, but the result was the occupation of the Principal.

As the "Casa Fuerte" remained the last resort of the defenders right at the river, the Republicans decided to attack with heavy artillery from the hill of the Encarnación. Having seen the shelling the French auxiliaries and General Vegas' Mexicans thus evacuated themselves to the ships and sailed to Laguna. The fleeing garrison left big amount of supplies behind among these were two pieces of 68-pound artillery, one 12-pound and 4-pounder culverins, an 8 pounder cannon and its rotating platform, three small 2-pounder pieces, 90 firearms with bayonets, 8 lances, 77 cans of shrapnel, a barrel of grenades and five horses.

== Mexican order of battle ==
Reorganized Mexican divisions after the extraordinary general order of Felipe J. Serra of January 14, 1864.

Mexican divisions of the Tabasquian Operations
- First command
  - Colonel-in-chief Gregorio Mendez
  - Commander Eusebio Castillo
  - Colonel Lino Merino
  - Lieutenant Colonel Andres Sanchez
  - Battalion Commander Pedro Fuentes
  - Secretary to Battalion Commander Francisco Vídaña
  - Commissioner of war captain Miguel Payan Ortiz
  - Assistant to Colonel-in-chief captain Francisco Chapuz
- 1st Center coloumn
  - Companies of Cárdenas and Huimanguillo (Francisco Ramírez)
- 2nd Right coloumn
  - Zaragoza section (Juan R. de la Rosa)
- 3rd Left coloumn
  - Companies of Hidalgo, Valle and Juchitán (Narciso Sáenz)
- 4th Reserves
  - "Castillo" section (Cornelio Castillo)
- 5th Artillery (Mateo Pimienta)
- 6th Cavalry (Mariano Alfaro)

== See also ==
- List of battles of the French intervention in Mexico
