= Battle of San Pablo del Monte =

1863 battle of the second French intervention in Mexico

Coordinates: 19.1167°N 98.1667°W

- Part of the second French intervention in Mexico
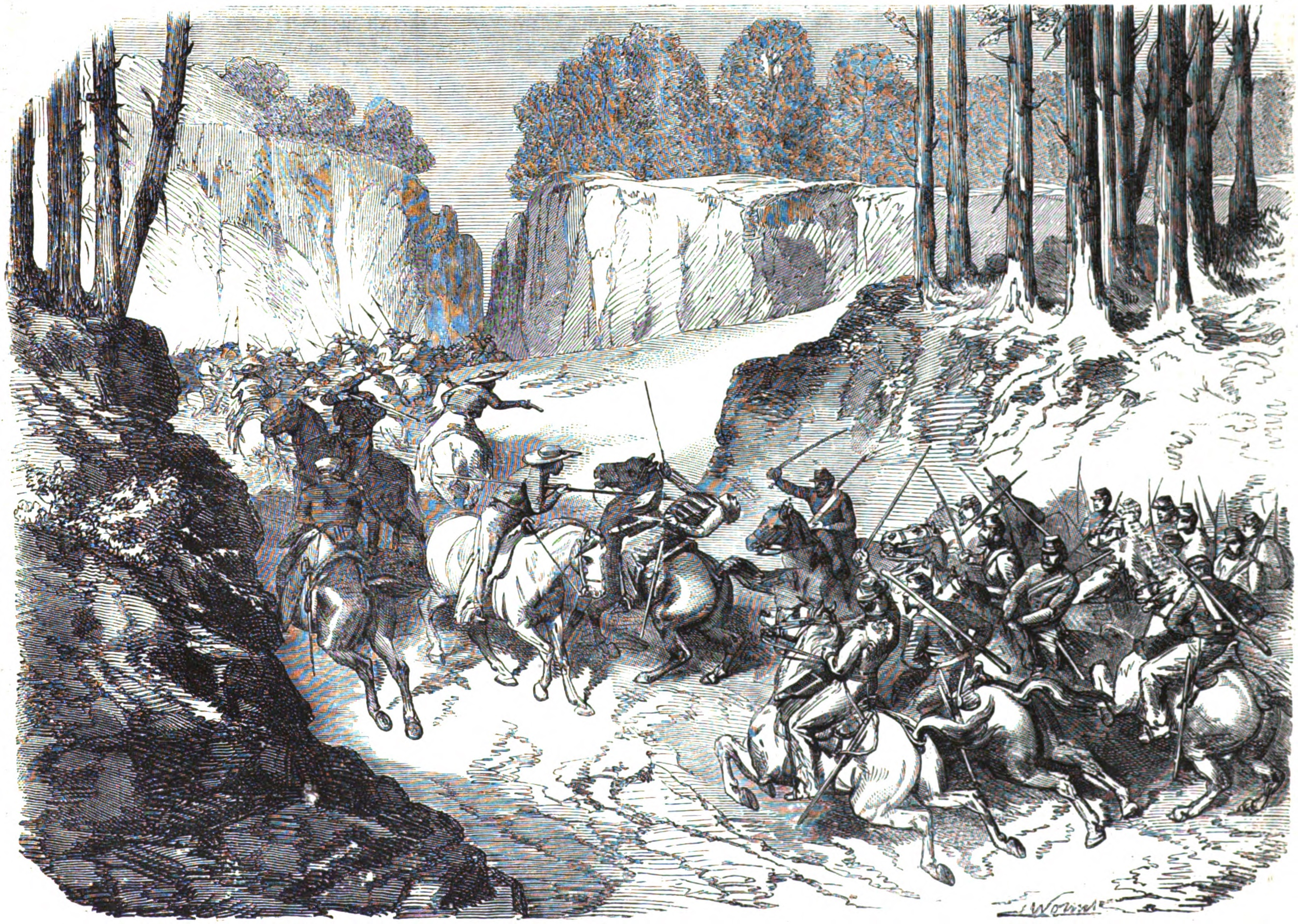
- Aymard de Foucauld's death during the battle
Date	May 5, 1863
Location	San Pablo del Monte, Tlaxcala, Mexico
Result	French victory

Belligerents
Mexican republicans	France

Commanders and leaders
Vicente Riva Palacio	Aymard de Foucault †; Oswald Bénigne de Montarby

Units involved
Central Army	99th Line Grenadier Regiment; Battalions of Light Infantry of Africa

Strength
1,000 soldiers	2,000 soldiers

Casualties and losses
20 dead 20 POWs	4 dead 12 injured

The Battle of San Pablo del Monte took place on May 5, 1863 during the Siege of Puebla (1863).

== See also ==
- List of battles of the French intervention in Mexico
