= Capture of Mazatlán =

Battle of Mazatlán
- Part of the Second French intervention in Mexico
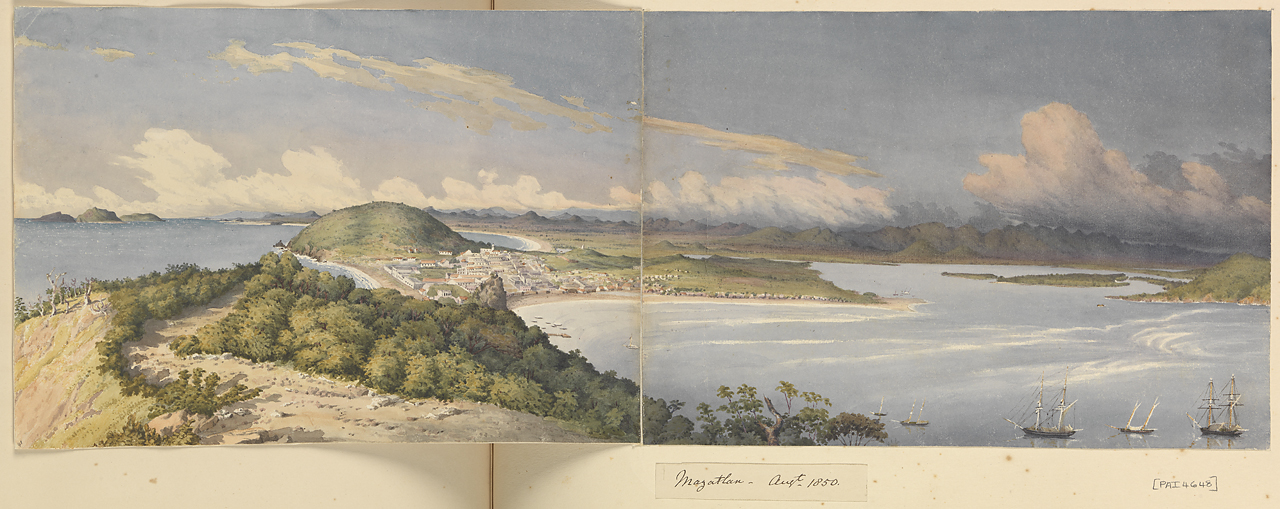
- contemporary view of Mazatlán
Date	28–31 March 1864
Location	Mazatlán, Mexico
Result	Mexican Republican victory

Belligerents
(France) French Empire	(Mexico) Mexican Republicans

Commanders and leaders
Marlineau des Chenez	Jesus García Morales; Gaspar Sanchez Ochoa; Marcial Benitez; Miguel Quintana; Jose Gamboa; Cleopas Tagle

Casualties and losses
Unknown	1 dead 5 injured

The Capture of Mazatlán was a Mexican victory during the Second French intervention in Mexico. Mazatlán was a key port of the Pacific trade routes yielding between $4 and $5 million a year.

== First battle ==
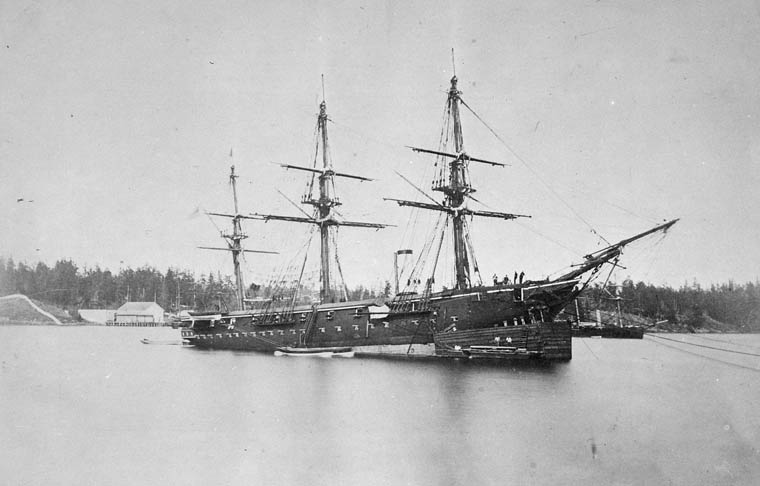
HMS Charybdis hosted a banquet for the victorious Mexican officers after the battle

After his arrival in the city, Colonel Gaspar Sanchez Ochoa rapidly fortified the northern land entrance of the city at the foot of the Nevería hill, extending to the old harbor. On the opposite side, towards the town, he set up his headquarters on the beach, and installed some small pieces of artillery. Additionally, groups of soldiers were placed in reserve in a well situated position to the west, where there are three islands close to the side of the old port.

On 28 March 1864, the French flagship La Cordelière appeared near the center island, signaling between the French war vessels and boats which were about to land artillery and troops. French ships were being spread to a half circle around the shooting range of the port. At first all the boats advanced a league forward and unleashed their artillery while approaching the Mexican positions, which was answered by six batteries commanded by Captain Marcial Benitez. Then a group of boats evaded to the left and only three boats remained in front of the total fourteen, which landed their troops. Captain Marcial Benitez stayed on the beach with two batteries to face the ships, while Colonel Gaspar Sanchez Ochoa, with four battery pieces commanded by Artillery Captain Jose Gamboa, and two battalions, advanced to confront those who had just landed. He proceeded quickly by ordering his troops to march at double time and to open fire, then switched into battle formation and, following an artillery strike and a series of gunshots, the French soldiers fled toward their boats.

The land victory had been of great importance, though an unfortunate accident halted the enthusiasms of the Mexicans for a few minutes. The first captain of Engineers, Miguel Quintana, responsible for ordering the battery pieces to shell the invaders who had come by land, along with Lieutenant Cleopas Tagle, also of the Engineers, wanted to personally roll some cartridges into position, when they exploded under unclear circumstances, and a grenade left Quintana seriously injured, three other gunners and a sergeant wounded, and one soldier dead. Meanwhile, the French boats rowed back to their ships with the surviving landing forces carrying their dead and wounded.

The battle continued on the 31st when La Cordelière positioned itself to half firing range to face the fortifications, picked up her sails, triced up her war flag and hoisted her signal fire, and proceeded to launch 120-pound bomb into the city, injuring some workers and regulars. Colonel Ochoa rode to the shore with the only piece that had a wider range, commanded by Captain Marcial Benitez. He exchanged shots with La Cordelière for six hours with its 80-caliber cannon, until the French ship was covered in smoke and fire. The French flagship's inaccurate shots failed to do much damage to the forts or crew. Late that night, governor Jesus García Morales arrived on the scene and observed the combat as well as the British sloop-of-war Charybdis and Lancaster of the American Navy. La Cordelière had to attend to the damage done to its deck, doused the war flag, and withdrew to the nearby island of Isla del Venado.

== Surrender ==
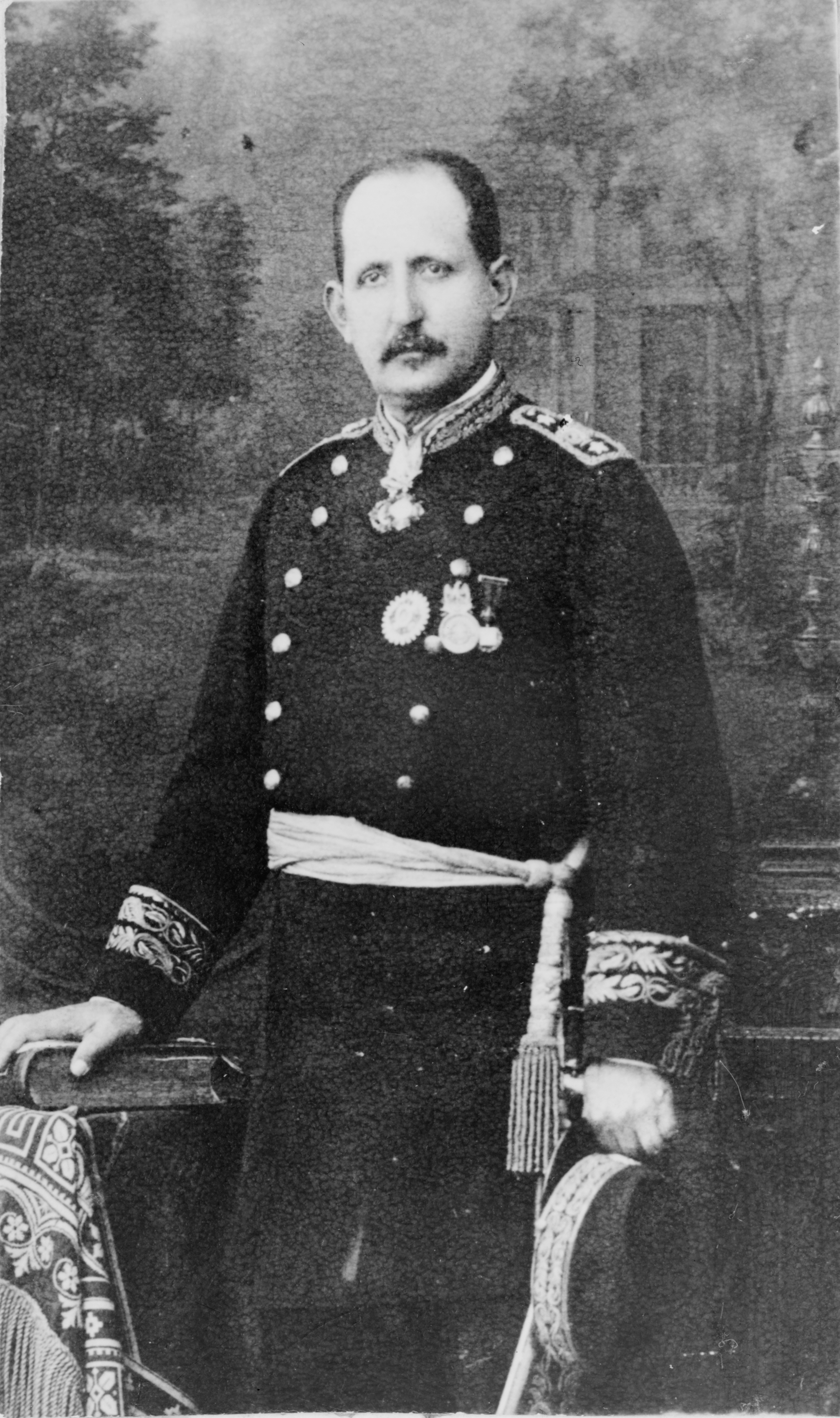
Ramón Corona, controversial defender of the city

The takeover of the city was preceded by a naval blockade dating from mid-April 1864 and a four-way oligarchy regarding the control of the city within the Juarista party. In May Plácido Vega, 3rd division central army general and his volunteer garrison guarded Mazatlán. In October 1864 Jesus García Morales the liberal governor of Nuevo León and one of his officers Ramón Corona both decided to take supreme control of Mazatlán and engaged in internal disputes that resulted in Morales placing an arrest warrant on his officer for misappropriation. On 10 October Ramón Corona was residing in the Presidio some miles away south-east of the city. He emptied the fort the next day and moved in the direction of Los Urias halfway to Mazatlán and asked Morales to officially surrender to him on the 15th. Morales declined and issued immediate war preparations against his fellow rebel officer. He mounted all the guns of the port (48 pieces) on the land passage into the city. His 500-strong garrison faced 600 infantry and 200 cavalry. Corona also had 1,000 reinforcements put on reserve. At 2 a.m., Corona launched an assault from the south 1.5 miles far from the city center. His army easily broke through the first line of defense of the artillery. After a very short close combat Morales' soldiers retreated in disorder. Corona claimed the city for himself and arrested Morales personally. Altogether 18 Republicans were killed and 15 more were wounded just before the arrival of the French forces. Antonio Rosales governor of Sinaloa arrived on the scene in late October and subdued the city for himself, overthrowing the sovereignty of the previous pretenders. Seeing this situation, the inhabitants favored a French occupation. On 24 October three French warships, the Victoire, D'Assas, and the Diamant departed from Acapulco with two Zouave companies (250 riflemen) led by Gustave-Joseph Munier, 150 marins, and 70 Egyptians on board. under the command of Captain Thomas Louis Le Normant de Kergrist. Manuel Lozada, an Imperialist officer, approached the vicinity of the town from inland and waited for the enclosure by the French navy. The city began its evacuation and the population fled from the coastline. On 12 November the Pacific Naval Division reached the port and was greeted by Commander Rosales under the flag of truce. Negotiations started on that very day and an ultimatum was handed over by the French with a deadline of 13 November. A second written notice was then sent, further threatening the Mexican command that any resistance would result in immediate hostilities which would also affect the neutral (mostly American) ships in the harbor. Rosales replied by putting the coastal batteries on alert, which gave them the ability to fire on any ship coming within their range. The next day at six o'clock the frigates started shelling the houses, damaging several of them. The Republican commander, escorted by the local consuls, sailed to the flagship on a boat to inform the French high command that they had fulfilled the criteria for surrender the previous night and thus evacuated Corona's garrison as requested. French troops landed, and Lozada's men (a force of 5000 soldiers) seized the city. One American citizen was shot on sight. A connection with San Blas and Zacatecas was established and the weapons trade as well as carrying of any arms were prohibited.

The advocate for surrender General Corona tried to retake the city three times unsuccessfully in 1866. Only after Lozada's defection and disbanding due to lack of payment could the liberal forces regain possession of the city on 13 November 1866.

== See also ==
- List of battles of the French intervention in Mexico
