= Siege of Puebla (1863) =

1863 battle of the second French intervention in Mexico

Coordinates: 19.0500°N 98.2000°W

- Part of the second French intervention in Mexico
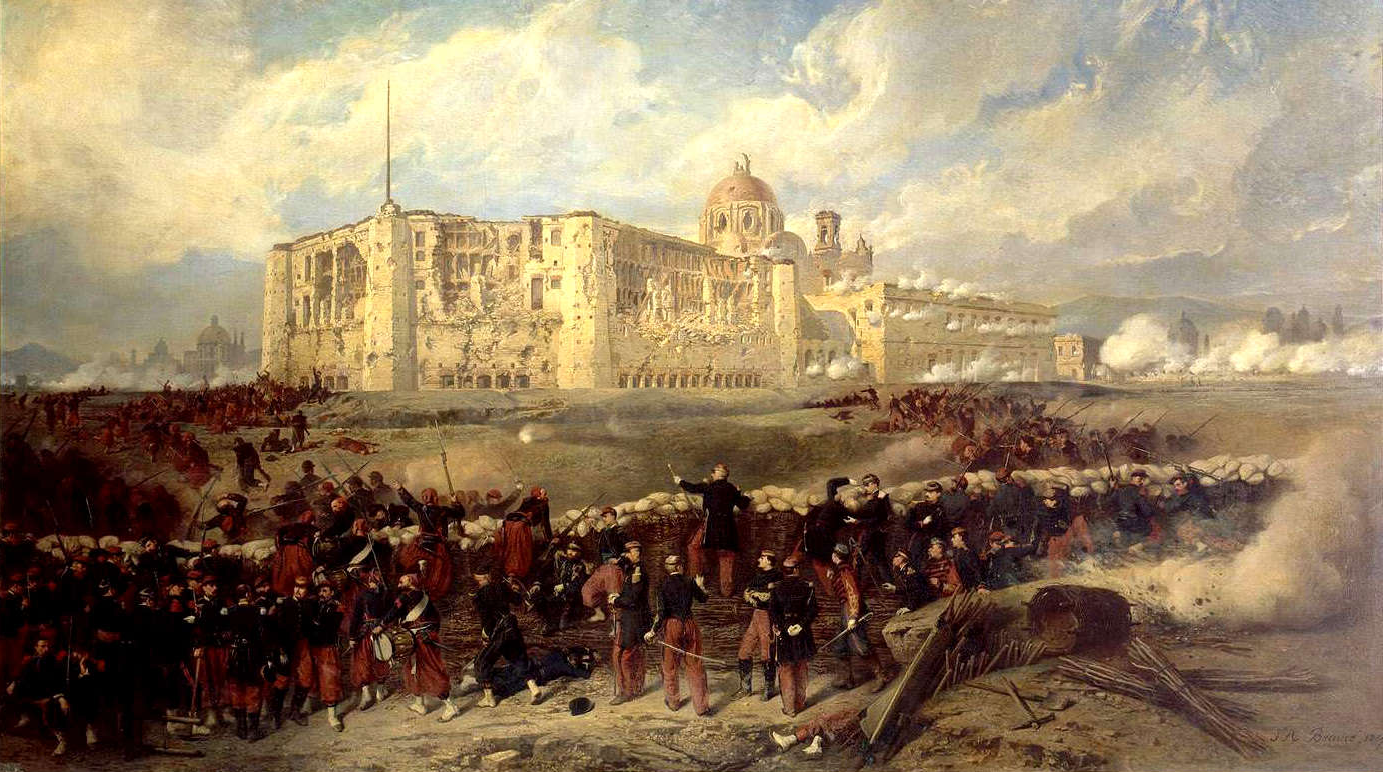
- General Bazaine Attacks Fort San Xavier During the Siege of Puebla by Jean-Adolphe Beaucé, 1867
Date	16 March – 17 May 1863
Location	Puebla, Puebla, Mexico
Result	Franco-Imperial victory

Belligerents
France; Mexican Empire	Mexican Republic

Commanders and leaders
Élie Forey; Félix Douay; François Bazaine; Leonardo Márquez; Juan Nepomuceno Almonte	Jesús Ortega; Ignacio Comonfort; Felipe Berriozábal; Porfirio Diaz; Tomás O'Horán

Strength
28,600	22,000

Casualties and losses
1,150 killed and wounded	2,000 killed and wounded 12,500 captured

The siege of Puebla occurred between 16 March and 17 May 1863 during the Second French intervention in Mexico, between forces of the Second French Empire and forces of the Second Federal Republic of Mexico. The French were advancing toward Mexico City, and were blocked by Mexican troops at Puebla.

== Background ==
French forces had advanced toward Mexico City in 1862, but were defeated at Puebla on 5 May 1862. General Charles de Lorencez was dismissed and replaced by General Forey, who arrived at Veracruz in September 1862. During the winter, the French prepared for a new campaign in spring 1863, while in Puebla, Mexican forces under the command of General Ortega built new fortifications, including Fuerte ("fort") San Javier.

== Siege ==
The siege began on 16 March with an encircling movement led by Generals Bazaine and Douay. By 18 March, encirclement was effective and by 22 March, a relief attempt by Mexican troops from Cholula had failed.

On 29 March, French troops made the first assault on Fort San Javier. Against serious resistance from the Mexicans, it took 20 hours for the French to emerge victorious in a particularly confused melee. On 31 March, the French seized the convent of Guadalupita. From that moment resistance became even more ferocious. The Mexicans raised barricades in every street and forced the French to fight house to house. Simultaneously, the French repulsed another Mexican offensive which aimed to break the siege.

On 25 April, after failing to capture the convent of Santa Ines, the French decided to hold their position and wait for siege artillery to arrive. Troops of the French Foreign Legion escorted the siege artillery. During this operation, the famous Battle of Camarón took place.

From 5 May, General Ignacio Comonfort attempted to break the siege, but failed both at San Pablo del Monte and at San Lorenzo. On 8 May, 7,000 Mexicans attempted a great sortie, which was repulsed by General Bazaine.

On 16 May, the besieged Mexican garrison asked for an armistice; on 17 May the garrison disbanded. On 19 May, the French occupied the city and the road to Mexico City was now open.
