= Jean-Louis-Brigitte Espagne =

French military commander (1769–1809)

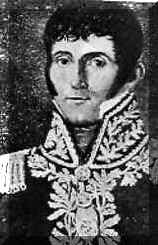
- Born: 16 February 1769; Auch, France
- Died: 21 May 1809 (aged 40); Lobau, Austria
- Military career
- Allegiance: Kingdom of France, Kingdom of France (1791-1792), French First Republic, First French Empire
- Branch: Cavalry
- Service years: 1787-1809
- Rank: General of Division
- Conflicts: French Revolutionary Wars; Napoleonic Wars
- Awards: Count of the Empire

Jean-Louis-Brigitte Espagne, Count d'Espagne and of the Empire (French pronunciation: [ʒɑ̃ lwi bʁiʒit ɛspaɲ]; born 16 February 1769 in Auch, died 21 May 1809 on the island of Lobau) was a French cavalry commander of the French Revolutionary Wars, who rose to the top military rank of General of Division and took part in the Napoleonic Wars.

== Revolutionary Wars ==
Born in Auch in a modest family, Jean-Louis-Brigitte Espagne enlisted in 1787 as a soldier in the Dragons de la Reine (Queen's Dragoons) regiment and then saw a very slow promotion through the ranks. In 1792, Espagne was maréchal-des-logis (roughly equivalent to sergeant) but the outbreak of the French Revolutionary Wars that year offered numerous opportunities for promotion. During the campaigns of the Revolution, he served successively in the armies "of the North," "of the Pyrenees," "of Italy," and "of the Rhine," subsequently fighting in the War in the Vendée. His talents were much appreciated and he gained the rank of General of Brigade in July 1799, before being sent to serve in General Jean Victor Marie Moreau's army. In this capacity, he distinguished himself throughout the 1800 campaign in Germany of the War of the Second Coalition, leading particularly impressive cavalry actions at the battle of Messkirch and battle of Hohenlinden.

== Napoleonic Wars ==
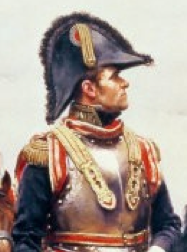
Jean-Louis-Brigitte Espagne in his uniform of general of the cuirassiers.

In 1805, General Espagne was promoted to General of Division, then the top military rank in the French army. With the outbreak of the War of the Third Coalition, he was promptly sent to serve in Italy, in command of a chasseurs à cheval light cavalry division, combating at the battle of San Michele, on 29 October. The next day, at the battle of Caldiero, Espagne led a very significant and successful action. He then took the strategic town of Gradisca. In 1806 Espagne was sent to serve in Marshal André Masséna's army in the Kingdom of Naples, where he fought against Fra Diavolo. Recalled to the Grande Armée at the beginning of 1807, he served in the army corps of Marshal Lefebvre during the successful siege of Danzig. Then, on 10 June that year, he took part to the battle of Heilsberg, where he was wounded. The next year, Espagne was created a Count of the Empire and in 1809 he was called to the command of a cuirassier division in the Army of Germany during the War of the Fifth Coalition. During the desperate battle of Aspern-Essling, Espagne led his cuirassiers in a series of heroic charges, but was wounded in action during the first day of fighting. He was immediately transported to the Danubian island of Lobau, but his wound was too serious and he died that same day.

The name Espagne is inscribed under the Arc de Triomphe in Paris.

== Sources ==
- Fierro, Alfredo; Palluel-Guillard, André; Tulard, Jean - "Histoire et Dictionnaire du Consulat et de l'Empire”, Éditions Robert Laffont, ISBN 2-221-05858-5
