= Louis-Vincent-Joseph Le Blond de Saint-Hilaire =

French general (1766–1809)

Louis-Vincent-Joseph Le Blond, comte de Saint-Hilaire
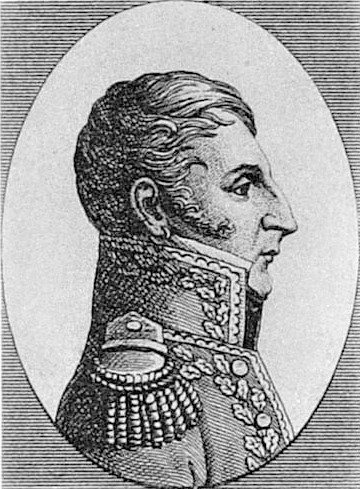
- Born: 4 September 1766; Ribemont, Kingdom of France
- Died: 5 June 1809 (aged 42); Vienna, Austrian Empire
- Burial place: Panthéon, Paris
- Military career
- Allegiance: France
- Branch: Infantry
- Service years: 1777-1809
- Rank: General of division
- Conflicts: French Revolutionary Wars; Napoleonic Wars
- Awards: Count of the Empire

Louis-Vincent-Joseph Le Blond, comte de Saint-Hilaire (French pronunciation: [lwi vɛ̃sɑ̃ ʒozɛf lə blɔ̃ kɔ̃t də sɛ̃t‿ilɛʁ]; 4 September 1766 – 5 June 1809) was a French general during the Revolutionary and Napoleonic Wars, described by Lejeune as "the pride of the army, as remarkable for his wit as for his military talents," and by Berthezène as "the finest division commander on the face of the earth."

== Origins and early career ==
Louis-Vincent-Joseph Le Blond de Saint-Hilaire was born in Ribemont, Aisne on 4 September 1766, the son of a captain in the Conti cavalry regiment. He became a cadet in his father's regiment on 13 September 1777, aged 11. In 1781, he sailed for the East Indies as a second lieutenant in the Binch hussars. Whilst there, he transferred to the Aquitaine infantry regiment (later renamed the 35th infantry regiment) on 16 September 1783. He returned to France in 1785, and was promoted to lieutenant on 1 June 1788 and captain on 1 July 1792.

== French Revolutionary Wars ==
Saint-Hilaire served in Army of the Alps from 1792 to 1793. He commanded the left wing of the advanced guard at the Siege of Toulon in 1793, and it was here that he first met Napoleon. After the fall of the city, he was promoted to provisional adjudant-général chef de bataillon by representatives of the people Saliceti and Barras on 27 December 1793 and posted to Masséna's Army of Italy. He took part in the expedition to Oneglia on 5 April 1794 as part of Mouret's division before coming under General Laharpe's command in August that year. Laharpe wrote this appraisal of the young officer:

The moral and political conduct of this adjutant-general has consistently been good, his principles pure and his civility unfailing. As for his military talents, they are beyond what should be expected of a young man of his age; on all occasions he has conducted himself with the utmost fearlessness and rare intelligence. He did two campaigns and the siege of Toulon with me, and I always found him capable of filling the foremost military ranks.

On 3 December 1794, he was provisionally promoted to adjudant général chef de brigade by representatives of the people Ritter, Turreau and Saliceti. At the head of two companies of scouts, he seized the Col de Thernes near Ormea on 14 April 1795 and defended it for three hours against a whole Piedmontese regiment, taking 300 prisoners. His promotion was confirmed by the Committee of Public Safety on 13 June 1795. Ordered by Kellermann to defend a position nicknamed Little Gibraltar with 480 men, he fought off an attack by 9,000 Austro-Sardinian troops on 19 September 1795, taking 600 prisoners.

Provisionally promoted to général de brigade on 26 September 1795, Saint-Hilaire led a column of 3,000 men in the Battle of Loano. During the battle he was struck by a canister shot and lost two fingers from his left hand. At the opening of Napoleon's Italian campaign of 1796–1797, Saint-Hilaire went ahead of the 1st cavalry division, ensuring there were enough stables for their horses. During the course of 1796, he led brigades in the divisions of Massena, Augereau, Sauret and Vaubois successively, and fought at Castiglione, Rovereto and Bassano. Fighting at San Giorgio near Mantua on 15 September 1796, he was wounded in both legs by a cannonball and a musket shot.

His injury prevented Saint-Hilaire from taking part in the expedition to Egypt, and instead he spent the next few years in rear echelon roles. He was in command at Lodi, then at Toulon (where he managed the depot for the Army of the Orient) and finally the 8th Military District centered on Marseille. He was made General de Division on 27 December 1799. In May 1800 he led a column of National Guard from the Var and Bouches-du-Rhône departments to join with Suchet's defence against Melas' attempted invasion of Provence. The Austrians were pushed back and he helped recapture Nice. Back in Marseille, he gathered supplies to send to those besieged in Genoa. On 12 November 1800 he was given command of the 15th military district at Rouen.

== Napoleonic Wars ==
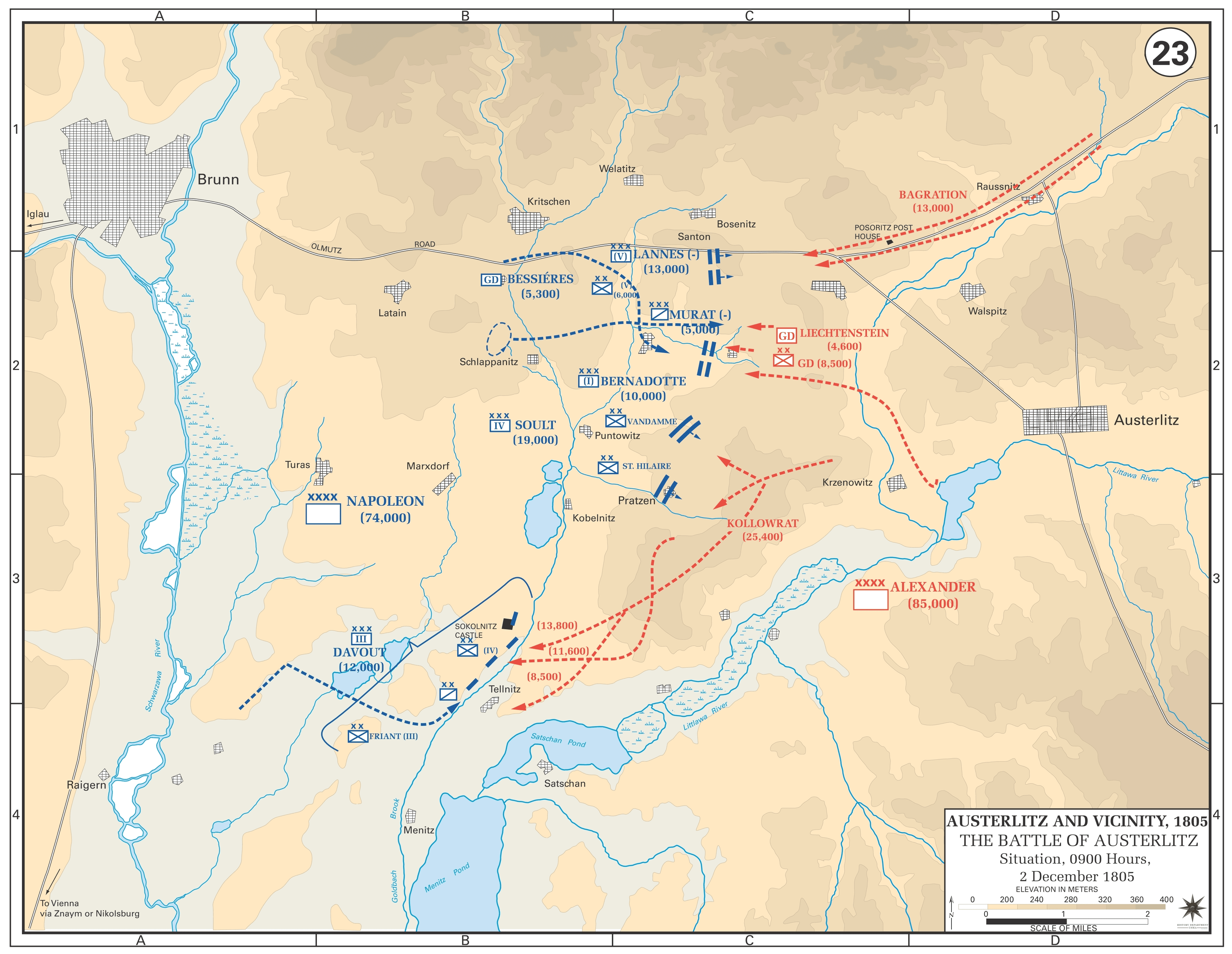
IV Corp's decisive attack on the Allied center in the battle of Austerlitz was led by Saint-Hilaire's division.

After the breakdown of the Treaty of Amiens, Saint-Hilaire was recalled to front line service and appointed to command a division at the camp of Saint-Omer under Marshal Soult on 31 August 1803. He was created a Grand Officer of the Legion of Honour on 14 June 1804. On the outbreak of the War of the Third Coalition, he led what was now the 1st division of Soult's IV corps of the Grande Armée on the march to the Danube and General Mack's encirclement at Ulm. At the Battle of Austerlitz, he led the decisive assault on the Pratzen plateau, receiving a serious wound at the beginning of the assault (his arm was broken in three places) but nonetheless retaining his command for the rest of the battle. Napoleon rewarded him with the Grand Cross of the Legion of Honour (then called the Grand Eagle).

The following year brought war with Prussia and Russia, and Saint-Hilaire's division continued to serve in Soult's IV corps. With it, he crushed the Prussian left wing around Rödingen at the battle of Jena. As the fighting progressed into Poland, he fought with distinction at Allenstein, Eylau and Heilsberg. In 1808, he was made a Count of the Empire and a Commander of the Order of the Iron Crown.

Not involved in the Peninsular War, Saint-Hilaire was instead transferred to command a division in Marshal Davout's III Corps of the Army of Germany. Saint-Hilaire's division contained many raw recruits, but nonetheless fought well in the opening battles of the War of the Fifth Coalition: Teugen-Hausen and Eckmühl. The day after the latter, Napoleon publicly told Saint-Hilaire "You have earned the marshal's baton; you will receive it!"

Saint-Hilaire did not live to see that promise fulfilled. On 22 May 1809 he led his division in the battle of Aspern-Essling, now as part of Marshal Lannes' II Corps. Toward the end of the day, he was struck on the left foot by a cannonball. He refused to allow his leg to be amputated, instead opting to lose half his foot. The wound became infected, and Saint-Hilaire died 15 days later in the Vienna house of the Apponyi family.

In 1810, Napoleon ordered his remains interred in the Panthéon, and that a statue of him be placed on the Pont de la Concorde (though this was never completed due to the fall of the Napoleonic Empire in 1814). The name Saint-Hilaire is inscribed under the Arc de Triomphe in Paris.
