= Jean-Marie Dorsenne =

Former French military officer

Jean-Marie-Pierre-François Dorsenne
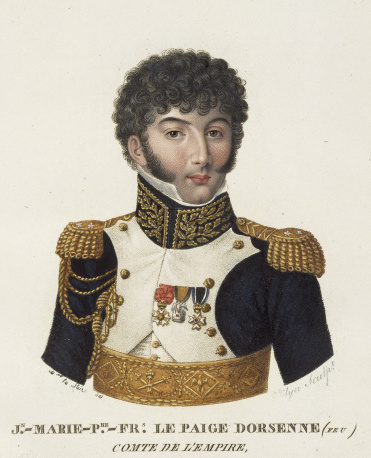
- Born: 30 April 1773; Ardres, France
- Died: 24 July 1812 (aged 39); Paris, France
- Military career
- Allegiance: France
- Branch: Imperial Guard
- Service years: 1791–1812
- Rank: General of Division
- Nickname: Le beau Dorsenne
- Units: 1st Grenadiers (1806–1807), 2nd Division (Old Guard) (1809), Army of the North in Spain (1811–1812)
- Conflicts: French Revolutionary Wars; Napoleonic Wars
- Awards: Count of the Empire
- Other work: Governor of Burgos; Governor of Old Castille

Jean-Marie-Pierre-François Doursenne, called Dorsenne, count Lepaige (30 April 1773 – 24 July 1812) was a French military officer of the French Revolutionary Wars and the Napoleonic Wars. He eventually became one of the senior commanders in the Imperial Guard.

== Early career and involvement in the Revolutionary Wars ==
Dorsenne's military career began in 1791, when he joined the army as a volunteer. He quickly rose through the ranks of the Armée du Nord and became captain, subsequently joining the Armée du Rhin and then the Armée d’Italie. With the Army of Italy at the crossing of the Battle of Valvasone (16 March 1797), Dorsenne's heroic conduct was noticed by commander-in-chief, general Napoleon Bonaparte, who promoted him to the rank of chef de bataillon (battalion commander). Bonaparte then enlisted Dorsenne's services for the Egyptian campaign, where the latter would display his usual bravery and would receive several battle wounds.

== Napoleonic Wars ==
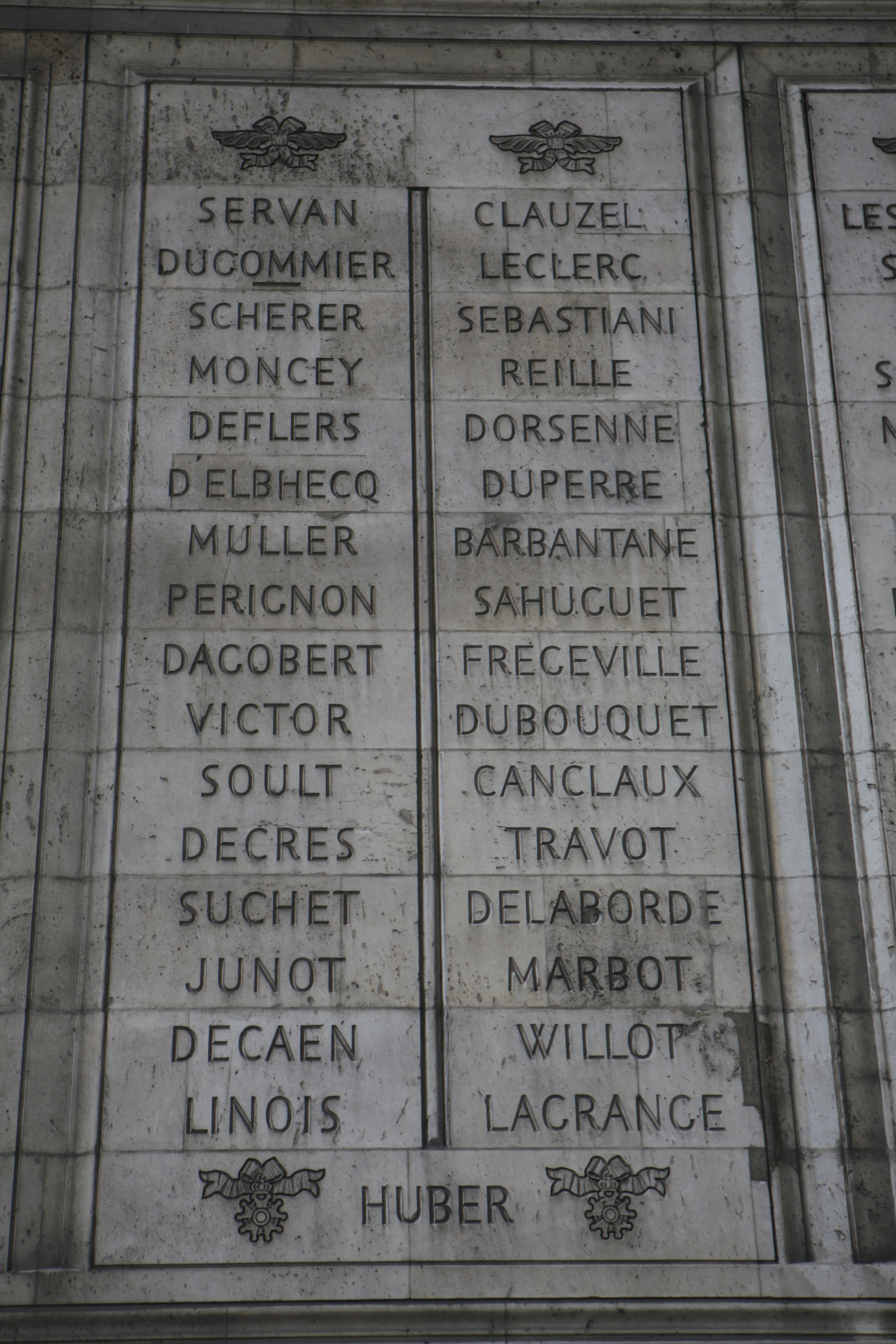
Dorsenne's name is inscribed on the Arc de Triomphe (5th from top on the right).

In 1805, after Emperor Napoleon created the Imperial Guard, Dorsenne was admitted in this elite unit as a major and displayed remarkable bravery at the Battle of Austerlitz, which would gain him the rank of colonel, on 18 December 1805. Only a week later, he was once again promoted, to the rank of brigadier general. By the end of 1806, Dorsenne had taken command of the prestigious Foot Grenadiers of the Imperial Guard, which he soon had to lead in combat at the bloody Battle of Eylau. An impeccable officer, Dorsenne was created Count Lepaige in 1808. His elegance and robust physique brought him the nickname le beau Dorsenne (the handsome Dorsenne). After serving briefly in Spain, when the War of the Fifth Coalition broke out, Napoleon called him back to the newly created Armée d'Allemagne and was given command of the Old Guard Infantry Division. After fighting at the battle of Ratisbon, Dorsenne had two horses killed under him at the battle of Aspern-Essling, subsequently receiving a serious head wound from a cannonball as he and his men were valiantly covering the retreat. He was promoted general of division soon after the battle and, after being present at the great battle of Wagram, was once again sent to Spain. There he was named governor of Burgos and then of Old Castile.

On 25 July 1811, Napoleon recalled Marshal Jean-Baptiste Bessières as commander of the Army of the North because of his negative reports of the situation. Dorsenne was Bessières' replacement. Paul Thiébault later wrote that Dorsenne was a "conceited imbecile", but in the opinion of Charles Oman his record does not match with the accusations of his jealous subordinate. In particular, Dorsenne had the good sense to cooperate with other French commanders more than was normally seen in Spain.

However, by the beginning of 1812 Dorsenne began to suffer from violent headaches, an effect of the severe wound he had received at Essling. He was forced to come back to France, where he had to undergo a trepanation. General Dorsenne, comte Lepaige died soon after the operation. His name is inscribed under the Arc de Triomphe in Paris.
