= Groß-Enzersdorf =

- Municipality
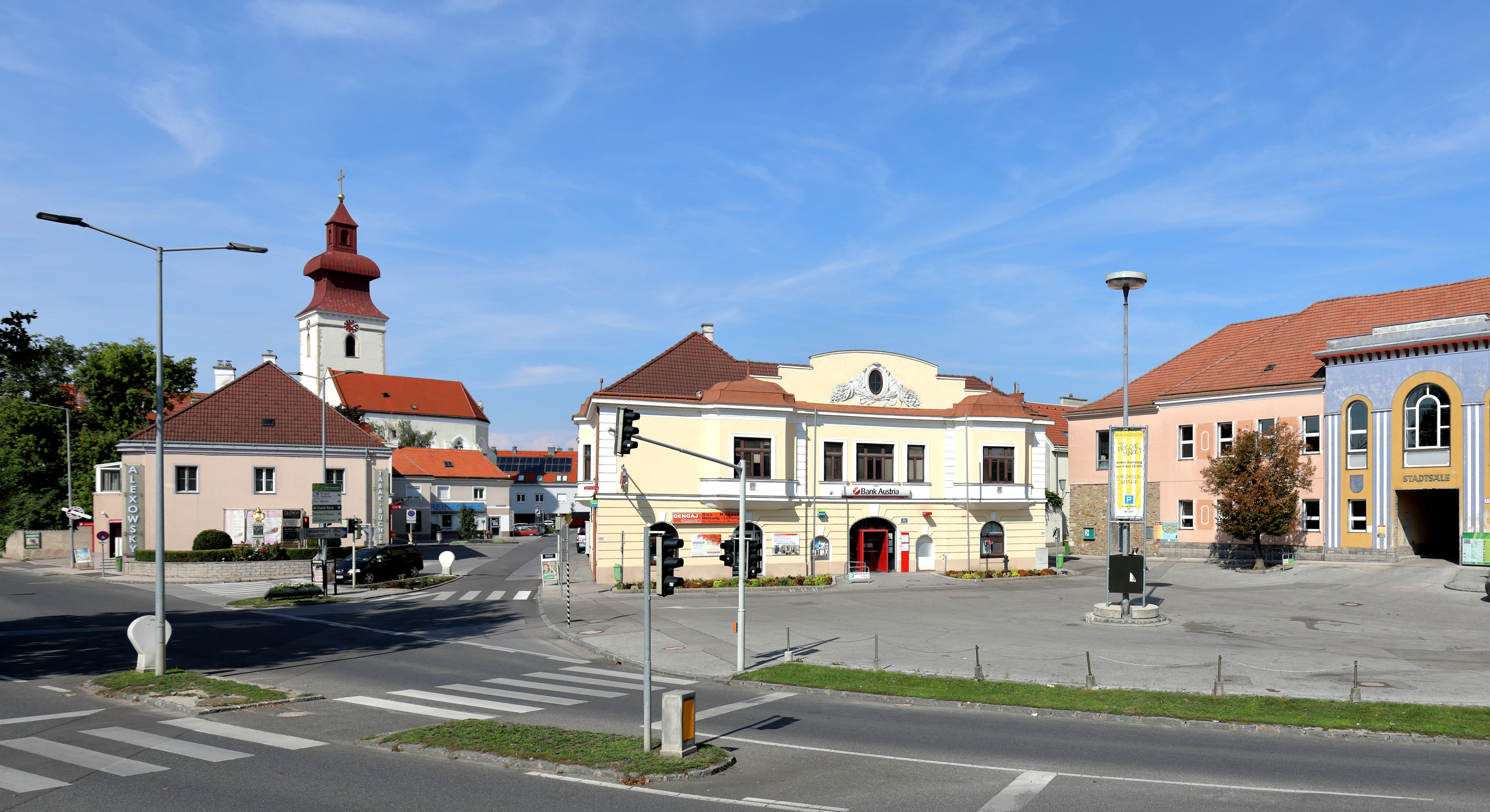
- Main square

- Coat of arms

- Location within Austria
- Coordinates: 48°12′N 16°33′E
- Country: Austria
- State: Lower Austria
- District: Gänserndorf

Government
  - Mayor: Monika Obereigner-Sivec (SPÖ)

Area
  - Total: 83.91 km^{2} (32.40 sq mi)
- Elevation: 156 m (512 ft)

Population (2023-01-01)
  - Total: 12,043
  - Density: 143.5/km^{2} (371.7/sq mi)
- Time zone: UTC+1 (CET)
  - Summer (DST): UTC+2 (CEST)
- Postal code: 2301
- Area code: 02249
- Website: www.gross-enzersdorf.gv.at

Groß-Enzersdorf is a town and municipality in the district of Gänserndorf in the Austrian state of Lower Austria, directly east of Vienna and north of the river Danube. Apart from the town itself, it also comprises seven subordinated municipalities.

== History ==
While the area was inhabited in pre-Roman times, the first written mention of the settlement by the name of Encinesdorf dates back to 1160. At its current location, an estate was built about 870. The area comprising this estate (the island Sahsonaganc, which roughly coincides with today's municipality) was donated to the Weihenstephan Abbey by Henry II in 1021, only to be transferred to the Diocese of Freising in 1028. While the general area was under the influence of the Diocese of Passau, a document of 1202 formally associates the church in Groß-Enzersdorf to the Diocese of Freising. By 1298, all of Sahsonaganc belonged to the Diocese of Freising and the administrative center was located in what was then called Entzeinestorf.

In 1396, the settlement received formal town privileges and the construction of a massive city wall started. The wall was completed in 1399 and still stands to this day. Despite these fortifications, the town was conquered several times and suffered serious damages in the subsequent centuries. In 1483, during the Austrian–Hungarian War the army of Matthias Corvinus, the king of Hungary, ransacked the town. In 1529, during the Siege of Vienna, the town was invaded by troops of the Ottoman Empire. In the aftermath, many Croats rebuilt destroyed houses and eventually settled in the town. In 1554, a fire destroyed all but a few houses in the town. During the Thirty Years' War in the first half of the seventeenth century, the town was occupied and again set on fire by troops of the Swedish Empire. This was followed by an outbreak of the Plague in 1679 and another occupation and partial destruction by the Ottoman Empire during the Second Siege of Vienna before the Battle of Vienna in 1683.

In 1693, Georg Rafael Donner, a baroque sculptor, who was born in the neighboring village Eßling, was baptized in Groß-Enzersdorf, marking the beginning of a relatively calm period, interrupted only by another major fire in 1730. In 1803, the belongings of the Diocese of Freising were secularized and thus Groß-Enzersdorf was formally transferred to the House of Habsburg. The town became involved in acts of war again in 1809, during the Battle of Aspern-Essling and the Battle of Wagram, suffering major damages. In 1850, Groß-Enzersdorf became the district capital, which was later in 1893 moved to Floridsdorf . In the second half of the 19th century, a Jewish community was founded and a synagogue was built. From 1886, the town was the terminus of a steam tramway connecting to the Viennese tram network, which was later electrified, however it ended its service in 1970.

The Anschluss of Austria to Nazi Germany in 1938 brought a major change on the local level for Groß-Enzersdorf: It was absorbed into the new Greater-Vienna and gave its name to the new 22nd district, Groß-Enzersdorf, which comprised many of the rural Marchfeld villages, but also some more urban zones to the east of the Danube that were already previously part of Vienna, such as Kaisermühlen. The synagogue was heavily damaged in the infamous Kristallnacht in November 1938, after which most of the Jewish population was deported. During the Second World War, the town suffered aerial bombings by the Allied Forces due to its vicinity to an oil refinery in the Lobau. Groß-Enzersdorf was conquered by Soviet Armed Forces on April 12, 1945. In Allied-occupied Austria the town was located in the Soviet zone and administratively remained in the 22nd district of Vienna until 1954, when it was re-established as a municipality within the state of Lower Austria.

The more recent history of Groß-Enzersdorf marks a shift from a service town characterized by its agricultural surroundings towards a suburban center, with many inhabitants commuting to Vienna.

== Geography ==
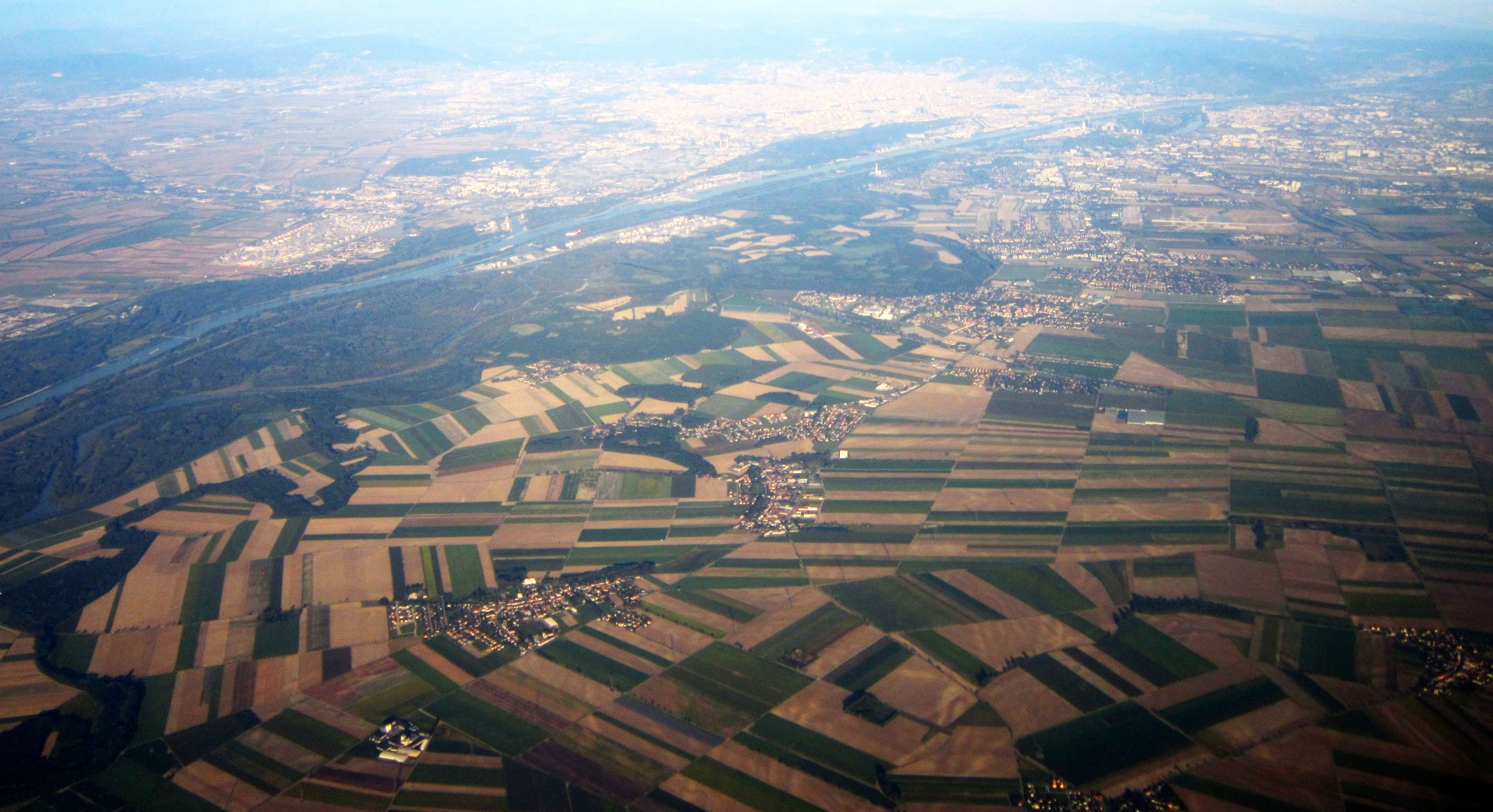
Groß-Enzersdorf and the dependent villages (counterclockwise): Oberhausen, Mühlleiten, Wittau, Probstdorf, Franzensdorf

The city is 18 km east from the city center of Vienna. It is just east of the Viennese municipality Eßling and next to the Lobau, which is a part of the Danube-Auen National Park. The city consists of the 8 administrative communes:

- Franzensdorf
- Groß-Enzersdorf
- Mühlleiten
- Oberhausen (including Neu-Oberhausen)
- Probstdorf
- Rutzendorf
- Schönau an der Donau
- Wittau

Historical population
Year	Pop.	±%
1910	4,705	—
1923	4,805	+2.1%
1934	4,995	+4.0%
1939	5,529	+10.7%
1951	4,896	−11.4%
1961	4,432	−9.5%
1971	5,019	+13.2%
1981	5,731	+14.2%
1991	6,750	+17.8%
2001	8,128	+20.4%
2011	9,533	+17.3%
2014	10,003	+4.9%

== Politics ==
The current mayor is Monika Obereigner-Sivec of the Social Democratic Party. The district council has 37 seats. Apportionment according to the district council elections from the 26th of January 2025:

- SPÖ: 19 seats
- ÖVP: 6 seats
- FPÖ: 6 seats
- Greens: 3 seats
- NEOS: 2 seats
- Gemeinsam für Groß-Enzersdorf (together for ...): 1 seat

== Culture and POIs ==
The village is connected to Vienna through the 26A Bus, which terminates at Kagran and connects to the U1 and U2 metro system.

Austrias only remaining Drive-in theater is situated in Groß-Enzersdorf, directly on the border to Vienna. It was opened 1967 and extended in 1990 to a "center" including three screens. On Sundays a flea market is held in the town. The town cointains the Marchfeld Center, a strip mall containing multiple different chainstores, including a grocery, a shoe store, a pet supply sore and an opticians.

The city has an old defensive wall, which was built from 1396 to 1399 and is still almost completely intact. The Danube–Oder Canal, a man-made waterway, runs through the villages of Groß-Enzersdorf and Neuoberhausen.

== Sports ==
In 2018, the local football club FC Groß Enzerndorf fused together with the nearby FC Mannsdorf to create FC Marchfeld Donauauen, who currently play in the Austrian Regionalliga East, the third tier of Austrian football.

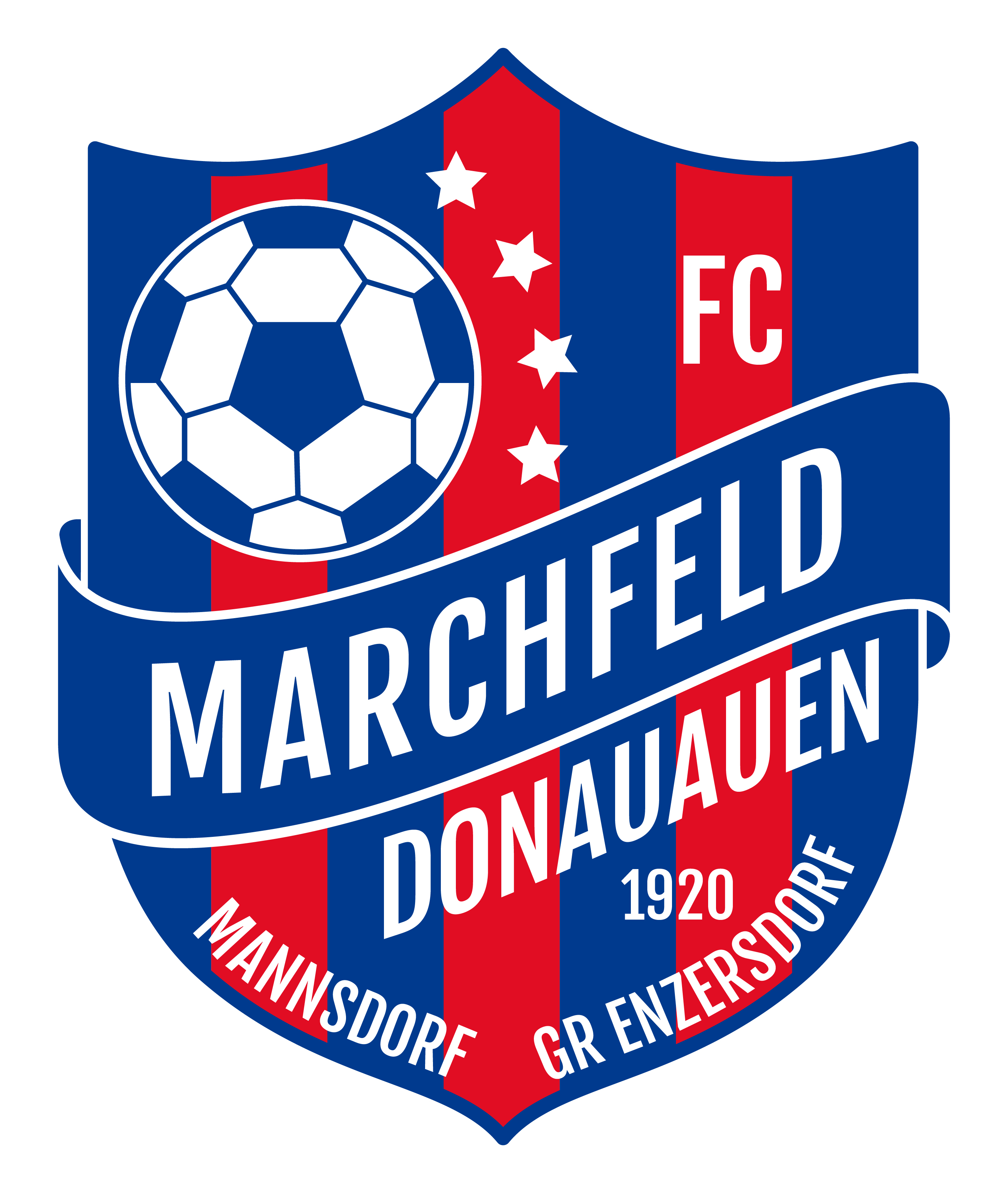
The logo of FC Marchfeld
