= Napoleon's Return to the Island of Lobau After the Battle of Essling =

Painting by Charles Meynier

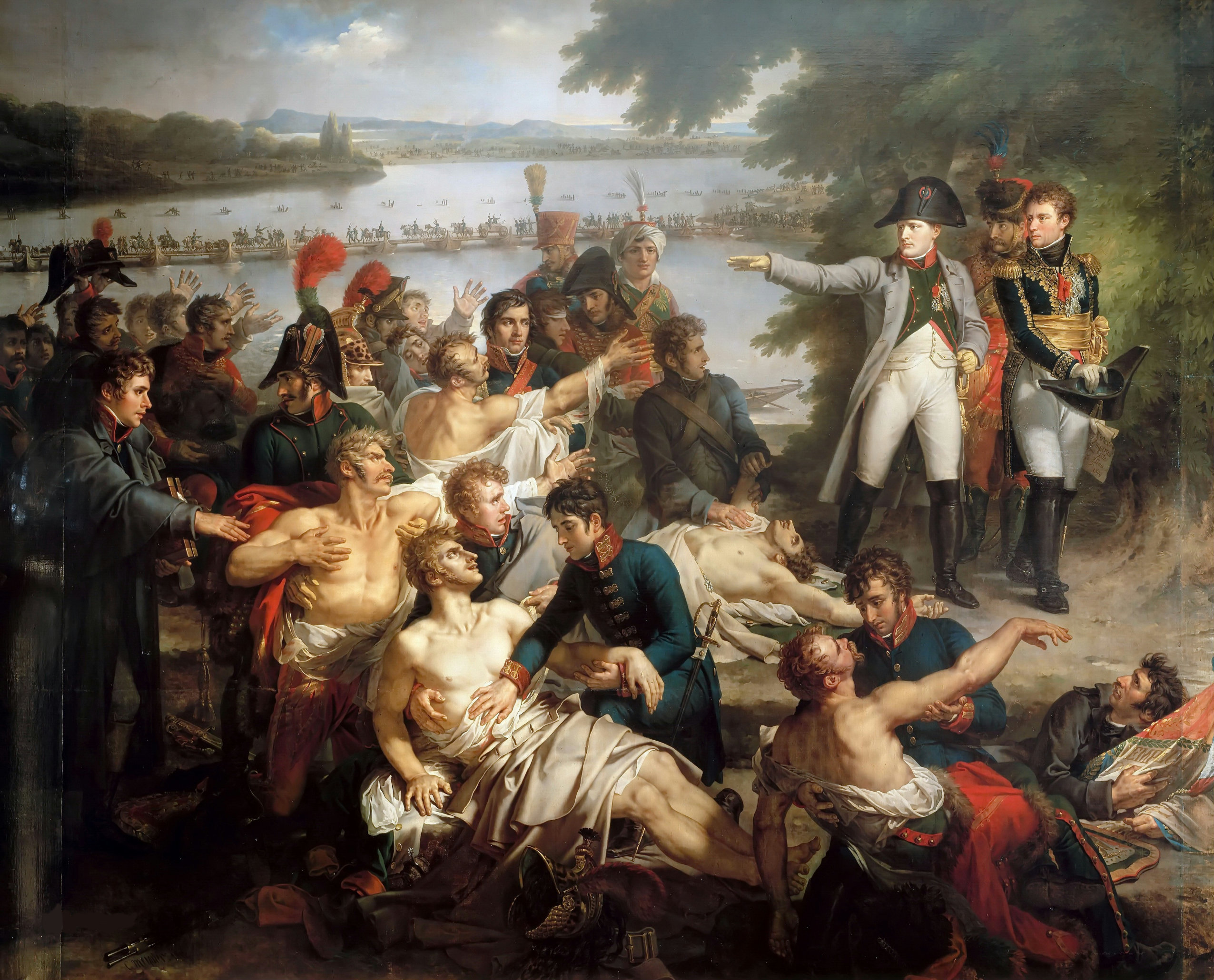
- Artist: Charles Meynier
- Year: 1812
- Type: Oil on canvas, history painting
- Dimensions: 473 cm × 529 cm (186 in × 208 in)
- Location: Palace of Versailles; Versailles

Napoleon's Return to the Island of Lobau After the Battle of Essling (French: Retour de Napoléon dans l'île de Lobau après la bataille d'Essling) is an 1812 history painting by the French artist Charles Meynier. It depicts a scene from the War of the Fifth Coalition, part of the wider Napoleonic Wars. After his defeat at the Battle of Aspern-Essling, Napoleon returned to the island of Lobau where the French wounded from the battle lay. The River Danube is in the background. Shown with Napoleon are his chief of staff Louis-Alexandre Berthier and his bodyguard Roustam Raza as well as the surgeon Dominique Jean Larrey. In July Napoleon would decisively defeat the Austrians nearby at the decisive Battle of Wagram.

The painting was commissioned by Napoleon for the Luxembourg Palace. It was displayed at the Salon of 1812 at the Louvre. In 1835 during the July Monarchy it was transferred to the Palace of Versailles.

== Bibliography ==
- Grigsby, Darcy Grimaldo. Extremities: Painting Empire in Post-revolutionary France. Yale University Press, 2002.
