= Battle of Aspern–Essling =

1809 battle during the War of the Fifth Coalition

- Part of War of the Fifth Coalition
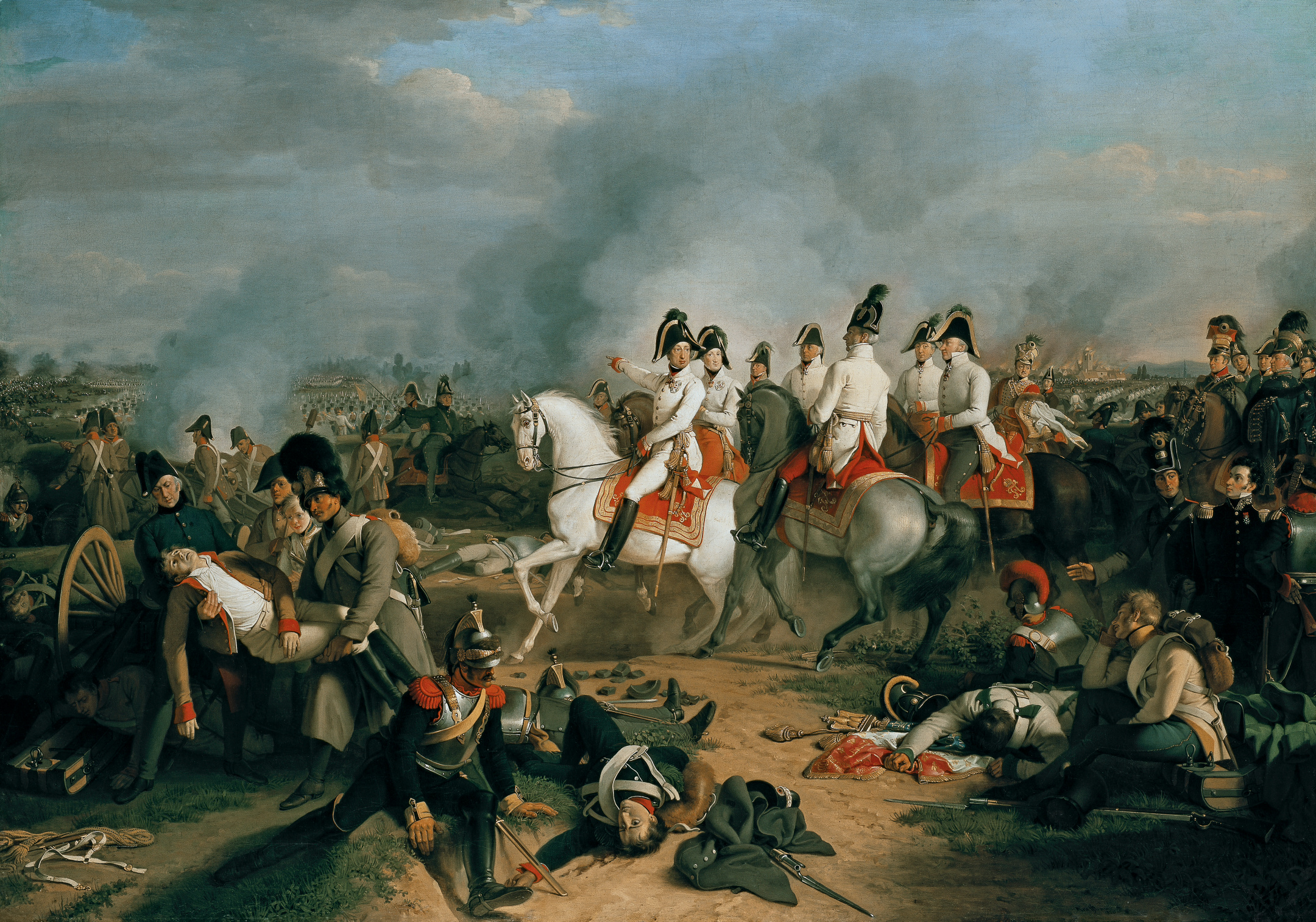
- The Battle of Aspern-Essling; Johann Peter Krafft, 1820
Date	21–22 May 1809
Location	Lobau, Vienna 48°12′47″N 16°30′09″E
Result	Austrian victory

Belligerents
Austria	France

Commanders and leaders
Archduke Charles; Johann von Hiller; Heinrich von Bellegarde; Friedrich von Hohenzollern-Hechingen; Franz von Rosenberg; Johann I of Liechtenstein	Napoleon I; André Masséna; Jean Lannes (DOW); Jean-Baptiste Bessières; Gabriel Jean Joseph Molitor; Antoine Charles Louis de Lasalle; Jean-Louis-Brigitte Espagne (DOW); Louis-Vincent-Joseph Le Blond de Saint-Hilaire (DOW)

Units involved
Hauptarmee	Army of Germany

Strength
98,000	80,000

Casualties and losses
23,000 (Note: Andrew Roberts (2014), without including missing, which is also considered a casualty, puts the number at 19,700 KIA, WIA, or POWs. The article from V. F. Novitsky (1911) provides the following data: 13 generals, 772 officers, and about 21,500 lower ranks (22,285). John H. Gill (2016) generalizes casualties, without specification. His figures coincide with those of Gaston Bodart (1908). There are also larger figures, such as 26,700 from Gunther E. Rothenberg (1995); he also points out that the French casualties were "about the same".)	20,000, (Note: Both Gill (2016) and Roberts (2014) acknowledge casualties at 20,000; Roberts, however, claims that they could also amount to 23,000. The article from Novitsky (1911) provides the following: 24 generals, 977 officers, and about 23,000 lower ranks (24,001). Bodart (1908) notes 25,000. There is unconfirmed report of 44,000 casualties and the propaganda figure of 4,100.) 3 guns
- Location within Europe

War of the Fifth Coalition
current battle
Napoleon in command
Napoleon not in command

In the Battle of Aspern–Essling (21–22 May 1809), (Note: Also simply known as the Battle of Aspern.) Napoleon crossed the Danube near Vienna, but the French and their allies were attacked and forced back across the river by the Austrians under Archduke Charles. It was the first time Napoleon had been personally defeated in a major battle, as well as his first battle defeat in 10 years since the siege of Acre, and his first battle defeat as head of state, although he did suffer a tactical defeat in the Battle of Caldiero and in the Second Battle of Bassano. Archduke Charles drove out the French but fell short of destroying their army. The French lost approximately 23,000 men, including one of Napoleon's ablest field commanders and closest friends, Marshal Jean Lannes.

== Background ==
On 10 April 1809, Austrian troops under Archduke Charles had crossed the border into Bavaria, a French client state; thus beginning hostilities without a declaration of war. The French, initially taken by surprise, were able to defeat the Austrians at Eckmühl, Abensberg and Ratisbon. The Archduke, fearing that his army might be destroyed, retreated towards Bohemia. After these victories the way to Vienna for Napoleon was eventually open. By 13 May Napoleon had entered the City.

== Prelude ==
Considering the French army would need to rest at Vienna, Charles decided to march there, joining Hiller at the Marchfeld. When he arrived there, he had an army of 115,000 men at his disposal. Napoleon could muster only 82,000 troops. The 8th and 9th Corps, numbering 38,000, were back on the River Traun, observing Johann Kollowrath's 25,000 Austrian troops who were entrenched on the north bank of the Danube near Linz. At the same time, they were safeguarding Napoleon's communications with France and his current centre of operations. They were also dealing with the inconvenience posed by local risings, which were becoming a constant source of concern. Davout, having previously crossed his corps to the south bank of the Danube via Straubing and Enns, was engaged on similar duties with 35,000 men near St. Polten on the River Traisen, approximately 40 miles west of Vienna. Meanwhile, Lefebvre's 7th Corps, comprising 22,000 personnel, was engaged in monitoring the movements of Archduke John's forces, specifically 8,000 troops stationed in Innsbruck and 7,000 more under Jellacic on the higher reaches of the River Enns, from the vicinity of Salzburg. In addition, the remaining 30,000 Austrians of Archduke John's army was responsible for maintaining a watch on the 57,000 Frenchmen of Eugene’s Army of Italy in Carinthia and Carniola.

Francis urged the Archduke to take immediate offensive action, given numerical superiority, but Charles had no wish to venture a major attack across the Danube. Charles argued that, by remaining on the left bank of the river, the army would retained freedom of manoeuvre. Napoleon wanted an early battle and he was aware that a decision was required urgently. He was concerned about the potential for unrest in his rear, the approach of John's army and the possibility of Prussian intervention and a reversal of Russia's position. Furthermore, he held the Austrians in low regard and believed that the main army was retreating into Moravia. He did not believe that it was in a position to deliver a significant battle on the northern bank of the Danube.

The French wanted to cross the Danube. A first crossing attempt on the Schwarze Lackenau was repulsed with some 700 French losses. Lobau, one of the numerous islands that divided the river into minor channels, was selected as the next point of crossing. Careful preparations were made and on the night of 19–20 May the French bridged all the channels on the right bank to Lobau and occupied the island. By the evening of the 20th many men had been collected there and the last arm of the Danube, between Lobau and the left bank, had been bridged. Masséna's corps at once crossed to the left bank and dislodged the Austrian outposts. Undeterred by the news of heavy attacks on his rear from Tyrol and from Bohemia, Napoleon ferried all available troops to the bridges, and by daybreak on the 21st, 25,000 men in three infantry and two cavalry divisions were collected on the Marchfeld, the broad plain of the left bank which was also to be the scene of the Battle of Wagram.

Charles did not resist the passage. It was his intention as soon as a large enough force had crossed to attack it before the rest of the French army could come to its assistance. Napoleon had accepted the risk of such an attack but he sought at the same time to minimize it by summoning every available battalion to the scene. His forces on the Marchfeld were drawn up in front of the bridges facing north with their left flank in the village of Aspern (Gross-Aspern) and their right in Essling. Both places lay close to the Danube and could not therefore be turned; Aspern, indeed, is actually on the bank of one of the river channels. The French had to fill the gap between the villages and also move forward to give room for the supporting units to form up.

== Order of battle ==
=== Austrian ===
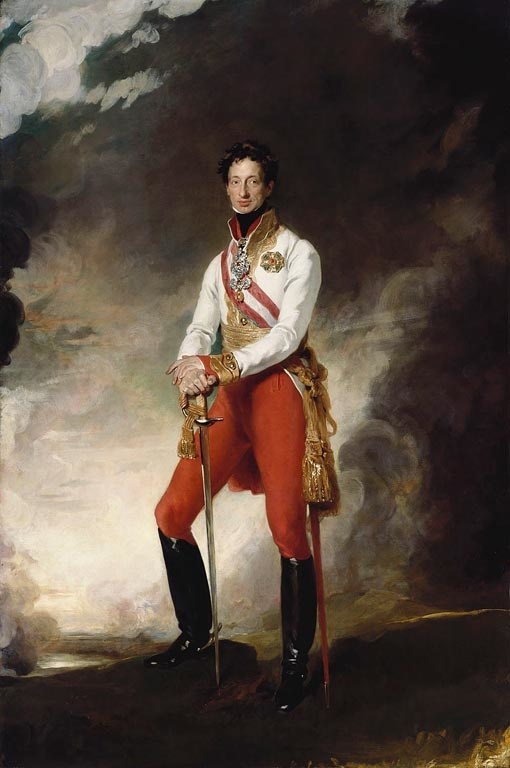
Portrait of Archduke Charles by Thomas Lawrence, 1819

Kaiserlich-Königliche Hauptarmee, under the command of Charles of Austria:

- 1st Column (VI Corps), Hiller:
  - Vanguard: Nordmann
  - Div. Kottulinsky
  - Div. Vincent
- 2nd Column (I Corps), Bellegarde:
  - Div. Fresnel
  - Div. Vogelsang
  - Div. Ulm
  - Div. Notitz
- 3rd Column (II Corps), Hohenzollern-Hechingen:
  - Advance Guard
  - Div. Brady
  - Div. Weber
- 4th Column (IV Corps), Rosenberg/Dedovich:
  - Div. Klenau
  - Div. Dedovich
- 5th Column (a part of IV Corps), Rosenberg/Hohenlohe:
  - Vanguard: Rohan
  - Div. Hohenlohe
- Reserve Corps, Liechtenstein:
  - Div. Hessen-Homburg
  - Div. Kienmayer
  - Div. of grenadiers, Lindenau
  - Div. of grenadiers, d'Aspre

Total: 99,000 men (84,000 infantry, 14,250 cavalry), 288 guns

The corps led by Johann von Hiller (VI), Heinrich Graf von Bellegarde (I) and Prince Friedrich of Hohenzollern-Hechingen (II) were to converge upon Aspern, while Prince Franz Seraph of Rosenberg-Orsini (IV) was to attack Essling. Prince Johann of Liechtenstein's Austrian reserve cavalry was in the center, ready to move out against any French cavalry attacking the heads of the columns. During the 21st the bridges became more and more unsafe, owing to the violence of the current, but the French crossed without intermission all day and during the night.

=== French ===
Armée d'Allemagne, under the command of Napoleon I:

- Imperial Guard:
  - Div. 1 (Young Guard): Curial
  - Div. 2 (Old Guard): Dorsenne
  - Div. 3 (cavalry): Arrighi
- II Corps, Lannes † :
  - Div. Tharreau
  - Div. Claparède
  - Div. Saint-Hilaire †
  - Div. of reserve, Demont (unengaged)
- IV Corps, Masséna:
  - Div. Legrand
  - Div. Carra Saint-Cyr
  - Div. Molitor
  - Div. Boudet
  - Brig. Marulaz (cavalry)
  - Div. Lasalle (cavalry)
- Cavalry Reserve Corps, Bessières:
  - Div. Nansouty
  - Div. Saint-Sulpice
  - Div. d'Espagne †

Total: 77,000 men (67,000 infantry, 10,000 cavalry), 152 guns

Following the overnight redeployment of Molitor's division between Aspern and Essling, the division is now fully concentrated in Aspern. The recently arrived divisions of Legrand and Boudet have been assigned to Aspern and Essling, respectively. Bessiéres' cavalry occupied the area between the two villages, along a slightly banked east-west road. Lannes, the official commander of II Corps, was given temporary control of Boudet's division and charged with defending Essling, the most vulnerable part of the French position.

== Battle ==
=== First day ===
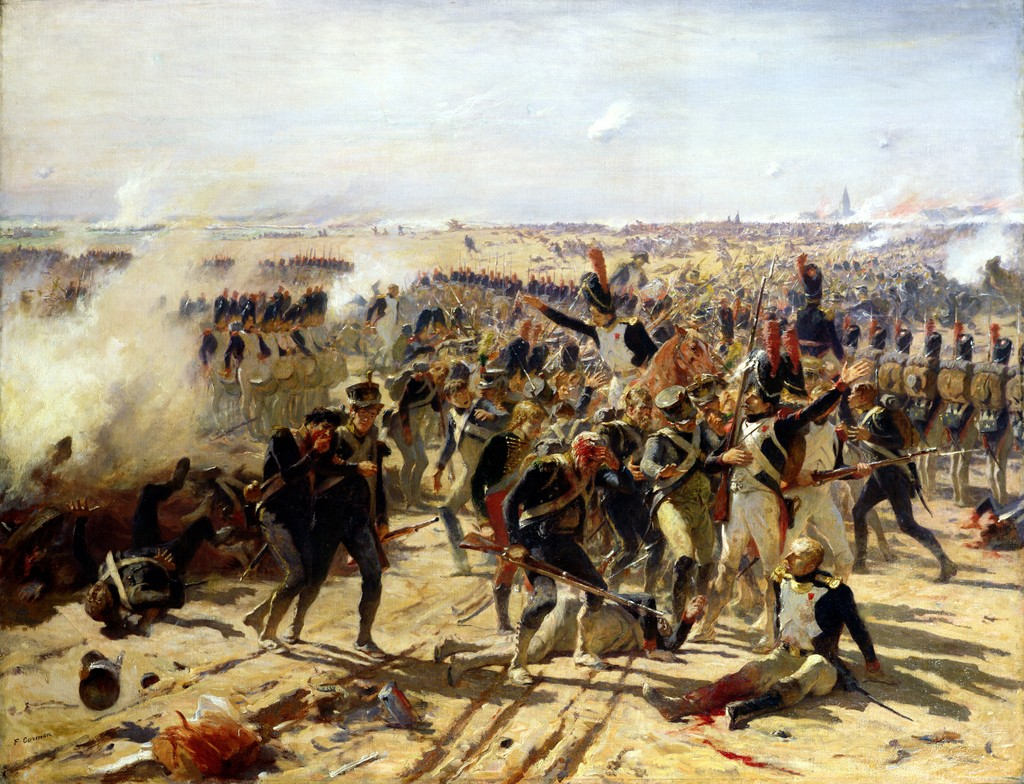
The Battle of Aspern-Essling, May 1809 by Fernand Cormon

Napoleon had not anticipated a significant engagement on the northern bank. The significant deployment of light cavalry at the head of the crossing schedule suggests that he still anticipated the necessity to locate Charles' army. At 4:00 p.m. on the 21st, Napoleon convened a meeting with his senior military officers to review the latest intelligence and plan the next steps. Despite the expectation that Bessières' advanced cavalry patrols would have discovered the presence of the main Austrian army so close to the bridgehead, they sent back no such information. This suggests that the French reconnoitering cavalry proved ineffective on this occasion. As there were no reports of the enemy, Lannes stated that he believed the army would encounter no more than 8,000 Austrians on the 21st, at the very outside. Only the cautious Masséna made an estimation that the enemy might already be nearby in force, but this was not agreed with by the others.

At approximately 1:00 p.m., the leading elements of the Austrian 1st Corps drove Molitor's outposts back into Aspern. The French were caught off-guard; the attack was hidden by the combination of a low ridge and a convenient dust storm until the last moment. However, Molitor was able to repel the initial attack and gain sufficient time to bring all four of his regiments into the town. Despite repeated Austrian attacks throughout the afternoon, the French defence held firm. However, by 5:00 p.m. the Austrian forces had formed a half-circle around Aspern, and Archduke Charles ordered a general assault. Molitor was now facing significant challenges in maintaining his position, with the enemy launching simultaneous attacks from three directions. In the hours that followed, Aspern changed hands no less than six times. However, Molitor was determined not to concede defeat and continued to hold his position until he could be reinforced by Legrand and Carra St. Cyr. This enabled the vital bridge to be opened to traffic once more.

Meanwhile, in a strategic centerpiece, the 7,000 sabers of Bessières engaged in a prolonged battle against Austrian cavalry and neighboring corps. The garrison at Essling was holding its own on the extreme right. Here, the French forces were only effectively attacked by Rosenberg's 4th Corps from 6:00 p.m. onwards. Due to Lannes' strategic deployment of Boudet's troops positioned within the town, the French successfully repulsed three successive Austrian attacks, maintaining control of their position and preventing significant losses.

Just before 7:00 p.m., the last new personnel arrived on the scene. St. Germain's brigade from Nansouty's division and St. Sulpice's cuirassiers were present for Bessiéres' final assault on the enemy centre, but there were no significant outcomes. With the onset of darkness, the majority of combat ceased, and the two armies settled into a state of relative calm, with the exception of the ongoing engagement at Aspern, where a narrow distance separated the French and Austrian forces. At his new headquarters in Breitensee, Archduke Charles was engaged in planning the next day's operations. Meanwhile, on the nearby island of Lobau, Napoleon was sending urgent messages to Davout in Vienna and mobilising all available troops in the bridgehead.

The bridge remained open for the majority of the night, allowing Lannes' command, comprising St. Hilaire's division and Oudinot's corps of grenadiers (Tharreau and Claparéde's divisions), to safely reach the bridgehead by 4:00 a.m. This contingent was accompanied by additional cavalry and artillery units. The new troops were immediately deployed to secure the central sector of the position, while Bessiéres' cavalry was redeployed to a local reserve position. Boudet's troops were still in control of Essling, with a contingent on their right occupying the open ground. On the left flank, Aspern and its surrounding area were under the control of Legrand and Carra St. Cyr. However, Molitor's depleted regiments, which had been the primary focus of the previous day's fighting, were relocated to a reserve position to the south. In addition, two divisions of the Guard were positioned to defend the bridgehead, and General Demont's division was preparing to cross from Lobau. This brought the French forces to around 50,000 infantry, 12,000 cavalry and 144 guns. They were facing over 100,000 Austrian troops supported by at least 260 artillery pieces.

=== Second day ===
Despite the cessation of hostilities in Aspern earlier that evening, sporadic fighting continued throughout the night. At approximately 5:00 a.m., the Austrian 1st and 5th Corps initiated a new full-scale assault on the town and the nearby wooded area known as Gemeinde-Au. This was conducted under cover of darkness and a thick mist. The fortunes of the struggle fluctuated, but a particularly successful counterattack by Massena at approximately 7:00 a.m. resulted in the French recapturing the entirety of Aspern. Meanwhile, Dedovich and Rosenberg leading the fourth and fifth columns, respectively launched a new attack on Essling. Despite making some progress, they were unable to gain the upper hand and were held back by Boudet's forces.

This meant that Napoleon was in a position to contemplate a breakout from the bridgehead. There is a strong possibility that he had intended Davout to provide support for this operation, but due to a lack of available bridges, Davout's corps was not involved in the battle. Notwithstanding this, Napoleon remained confident and ordered an attack from the centre of his position, perhaps with the expectation that Davout would still arrive.

Shortly after 7:00 a.m. Lannes' corps began to advance in echelon, with Saint-Hilaire leading on the right and Oudinot following in the centre and on the left with Claparéde's and Tharreau's divisions. They marched into a sustained bombardment, but the Austrians at the front wavered, forcing Charles to send his reserve grenadier divisions forward, which halted the French. Napoleon then tried to salvage the situation with a series of cavalry chargers under Bessiéres, but they too were driven back. At this point, Napoleon was becoming seriously concerned by reports from another quarter.

Shortly after eight o'clock he learned that the bridge had broken down again, meaning that Davout's corps could not cross. This, together with the fact that Lannes failed to bring the Austrian center down, left Napoleon with no alternative but to order a gradual withdrawal to Aspern and Essling. When Archduke Charles heard of the new collapse of the bridge at 10 a.m., he ordered his troops to attack again. All the while, fighting raged on the flanks. The first and second Austrian columns attacked Aspern again and another desperate battle ensued until an artillery barrage drove the defenders back. Shortly after 1:00 p.m., with no reserves left and exhausted after a day of almost non-stop fighting, the French finally abandoned the village.

At approximately two in the afternoon, Charles initiated a strategic withdrawal of his units, positioning approximately 150 cannons to engage the French centre. During this intense period of bombardment, Lannes was struck by a cannonball that resulted in a fatal injury to his leg. Napoleon was also subject to enemy fire and, at the insistence of his personal guards, withdrew to the Lobau. Subsequently, Rosenberg's IV Corps, supported by Merville's grenadiers, led by Charles, forced Boudet out of Essling. However, the general and a few hundred Grenadiers were able to hold out in the granary. It was imperative that Essling be held, and thus Napoleon dispatched General Mouton with some Young Guard battalions to retake the village.

Mouton advanced into Essling but was at risk of being isolated by Austrian reinforcements. General Rapp was dispatched with two additional battalions of Middle Guard Fusilier Grenadiers to reinforce Mouton. Rapp advised Mouton to disregard Napoleon's orders and launch a counterattack against the Austrian troops in Essling. The French battalions advanced, charged, repulsed and dispersed the enemy at the point of the bayonet. Rosenberg lost his nerve and fell back towards Gross-Enzersdorf. It was evident to Napoleon that his position was untenable. With no reinforcements or ammunition, his only viable option was to abandon the bridgehead and retreat to Lobau, where he could await the reestablishment of the bridge. Deciding that enough had been achieved, Charles did not pursue. The decision not to pursue allowed Napoleon to withdraw his army from the north bank of the Danube, and by 23 May the last French troops had left.

== Aftermath ==
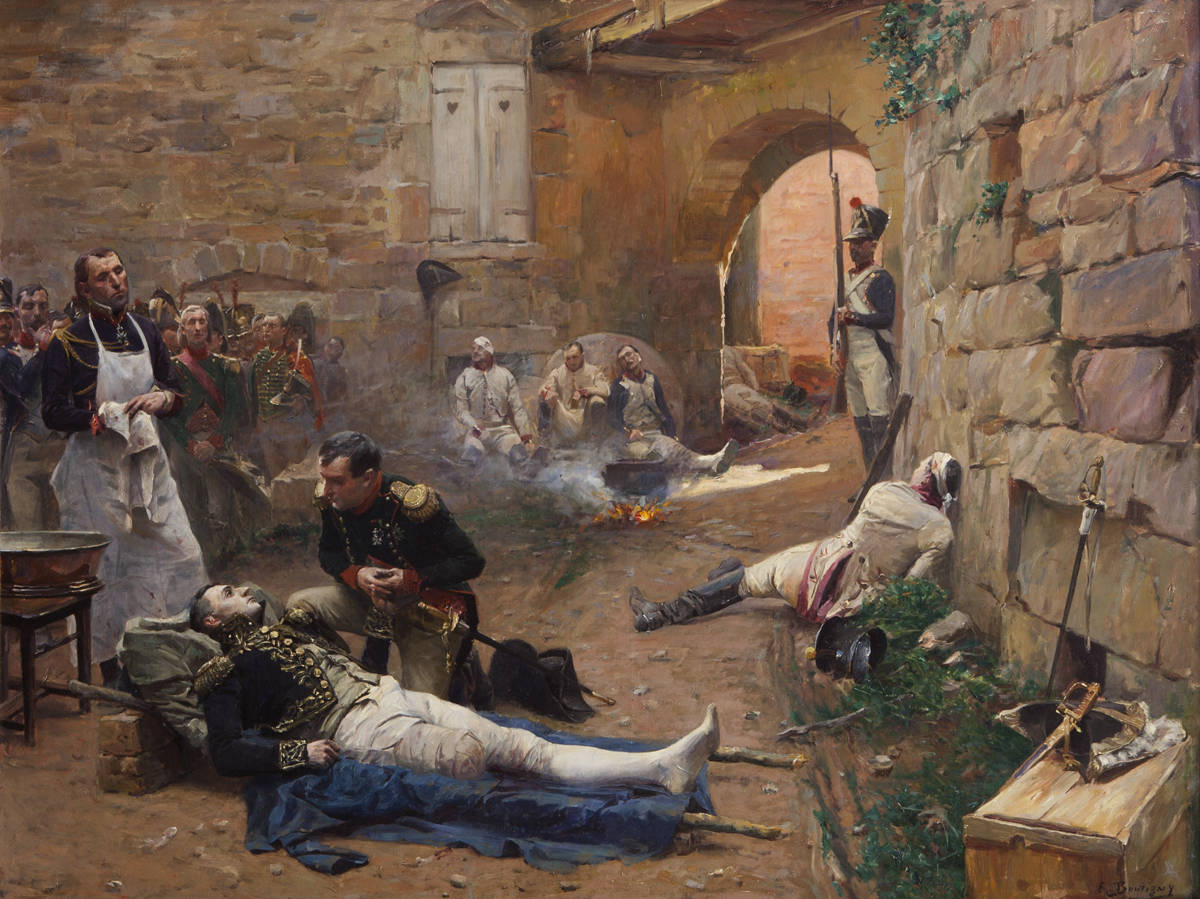
Marshal Lannes was mortally wounded at Essling. Painting by Paul-Émile Boutigny, 1894

After the surprise defeat at Aspern-Essling, the Emperor's reputation for invincibility was significantly damaged. The total number of casualties was estimated to be between 20,000 and 23,000 killed and wounded, along with 3,000 captured. Among them were one of Napoleon's ablest field commanders and closest friends, Marshal Jean Lannes. The Austrian losses were comparable, with 19,000 killed and wounded, though only 700 captured. In his subsequent bulletin, Napoleon acknowledged 4,100 killed and wounded, characterising the battle of Aspern-Essling as a new memorial to the glory and inflexible firmness of the French army. This was the closest he could come to an admission of defeat.

The Austrians had also suffered similar casualties but had secured the first major victory against the French for over a decade. When Emperor Francis I learnt of this victory, he was relieved. He then wrote a letter to his brother:

Lieber Herr Bruder, Erzherzog Karl!
Ihnen war es vorbehalten, das 15 jährige Waffenglück des stolzen Gegners zuerst zu unterbrechen. Sie, der meinem Herzen theure Bruder, Sie die erste Stütze meines Thrones, Sie sind der Retter des Vaterlandes, das Ihnen, wie der Monarch, ewig danken und Sie segnen wird.

[Dear brother, Archduke Karl!
It was reserved for you to be the first to interrupt the 15 years of military fortune of the proud enemy. You, the brother dear to my heart, the first pillar of my throne, you are the saviour of the fatherland, which, like the monarch, will thank thee eternally and bless you.]

— Francis I, Feldmarschall Erzherzog Carl

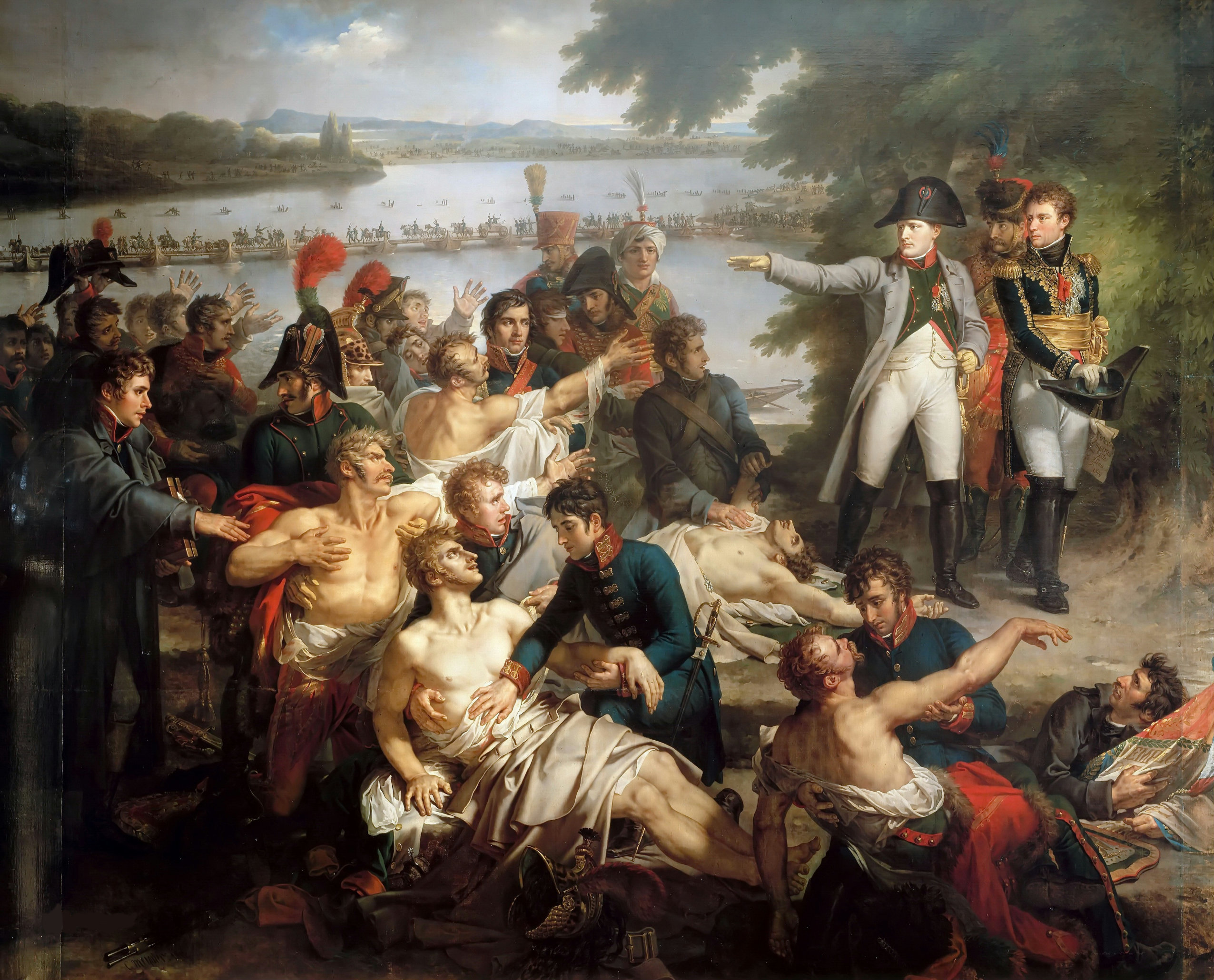
Napoleon's Return to the Island of Lobau After the Battle of Essling by Charles Meynier, 1812

The victory demonstrated the progress the Austrian army had made since the string of catastrophic defeats in 1800 and 1805. It also damaged Napoleon's longstanding reputation of invincibility after finally being defeated in battle. The loss of Marshal Lannes was an especially severe blow to Napoleon, as he lost one of the few marshals who was capable of independent command, something that would haunt him dearly in the future. The damage to Napoleon's image would ultimately not bear fruit for the Fifth Coalition since he would go on to decisively defeat the Austrians six weeks later at the Battle of Wagram.

== Accounts ==
Patrick Rambaud, a French author, wrote a fictionalized account of the conflict entitled "The Battle" using many first-hand sources. Just looking from the French perspective, the novel provides a rather realistic description of combat in the Napoleonic era, as well as detailed depictions of famous commanders such as Napoleon, Massena, and Lannes. The concept and notes for the book originally came from noted French author Honoré de Balzac. Marcellin Marbot, one of Marshal Lannes aide-de-camps, wrote in his memoirs of the battle, in which he had to observe the last moments of his close friends, and describes the amount of bloodshed and sadness which came to the Grande Armée after the crossing of the Danube. The army surgeon Dominique-Jean Larrey also described the battle in his memoirs and mentions how he fed the wounded at Lobau with a bouillon of horse meat seasoned with gunpowder. Larrey is quoted in French by Dr Béraud.

== Sources ==
- Béraud, Dr. (1841). Études Hygiéniques de la chair de cheval comme aliment (in French).
- Bodart, Gaston (1908). Militär-historisches Kriegs-Lexikon (1618–1905) (in German). Vienna: Stern. OCLC 230729343.
- Castle, Ian (1990). Aspern Wagram (1809). Oxford: Osprey. ISBN 9781855323667.
- Chandler, David G. (1966). The Campaigns of Napoleon. New York: Scribner. ISBN 0-02-523660-1.
- Chisholm, Hugh (1911). "Aspern-Essling, Battle of" . In Chisholm, Hugh (ed.). Encyclopædia Britannica. Vol. 2 (11th ed.). Cambridge University Press. pp. 767–768.
- Criste, Oskar (1912). Erzherzog Carl von Osterreich (in German). Vol. III. Vienna: Wilhelm Braumüller. OCLC 310047327.
- Gill, John H. (2009). The Fall of Vienna and the Battle of Aspern. 1809 Thunder on the Danube: Napoleon's Defeat of the Habsburgs. Vol. II. London: Frontline Books. ISBN 9781848325104.
- Gill, John H. (2016). Leggiere, M. (ed.). Napoleon and the Operational Art of War. Leiden: Brill. ISBN 978-90-04-27034-3.
- Haythornthwaite, Philip J (1996). Die hard! : dramatic actions from the Napoleonic Wars. London: Arms and Armour. ISBN 1854092456.
- Mikaberidze, Alexander (2020). The Napoleonic Wars A Global History. Oxford: Oxford University Press. ISBN 978-0-19-995106-2.
- Novitsky, Vasily F.; Schwartz, Aleksey V. von; Apushkin, Vladimir A.; Schoultz, Gustav K. von (1911). Военная энциклопедия Сытина [Sytin Military Encyclopedia] (in Russian). Vol. III: Аральская флотилия – Афонское сражение. Moscow: Типография Т-ва И. Д. Сытина. pp. 180–182.
- Parker, Harold T. (1983). Three Napoleonic Battles (2nd ed.). Durham: Duke University Press. ISBN 9780822305477.
- Roberts, Andrew (2014). Napoleon : A Life. New York: Viking. ISBN 9780670025329.
- Rothenberg, Gunther (1995). Napoleon's Great Adversary : Archduke Charles and the Austrian Army, 1792–1814. New York: Sarpedon. ISBN 1-885119-21-6.
- von Wurzbach, Constantin (1880). Feldmarschall Erzherzog Carl (in German). Salzburg: Dieter. OCLC 162430028.

Preceded by Battle of Tarvis (1809)	Napoleonic Wars; Battle of Aspern-Essling	Succeeded by Battle of Alcañiz
