= Lobau =

Vienna floodplain and protected area

National Reserve Lobau
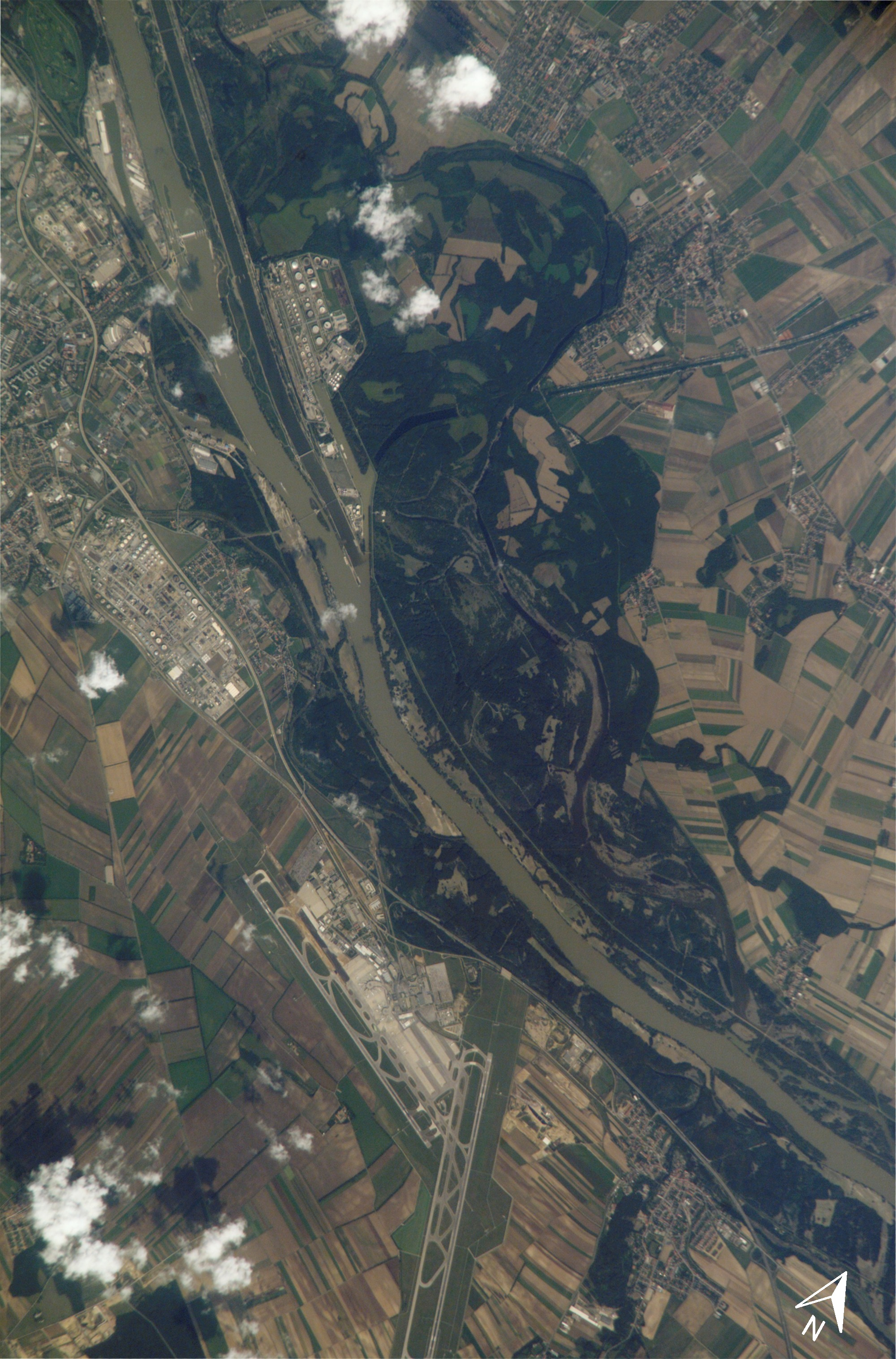
- Lobau (north of the Danube) and Vienna Airport in Schwechat
- Interactive map of National Reserve Lobau

Geography
- Location: Donaustadt, Vienna, Austria
- Coordinates: 48°11′00″N 16°31′00″E
- Area: 22 km^{2} (8.5 sq mi)

Ramsar Wetland
- Official name: Untere Lobau
- Designated: 16 December 1982
- Reference no.: 273

The Lobau (German pronunciation: [loˈbaʊ̯]) is a floodplain in Vienna, Austria. Located in the south-east of the city, on the northern bank of the Danube, it is a part of the Danube-Auen National Park.

== History ==
=== Before 1870 ===
The Danube meandered through the flat Marchfeld, forming floodplains that constantly changed due to floods.

==== Battle of Aspern ====
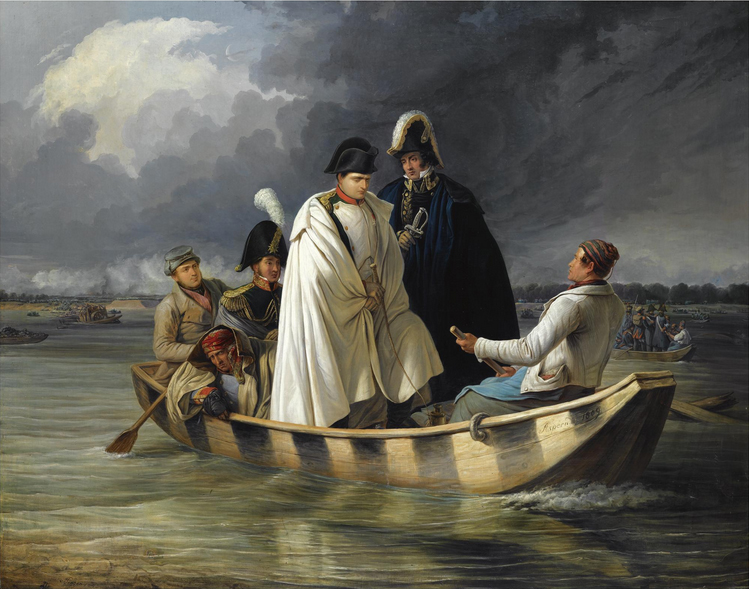
Napoleon crossing the Lobau

On May 21 and 22, 1809, during the War of the Fifth Coalition, the Lobau was the site of the Battle of Aspern. To confront the Austrian troops led by Archduke Charles stationed north of the Danube, Napoleon ordered his army to cross the river in the Lobau area near Kaiserebersdorf. The crossing of the Danube was a challenging operation due to the need to cross several wide branches of the river, and the absence of any bridges.

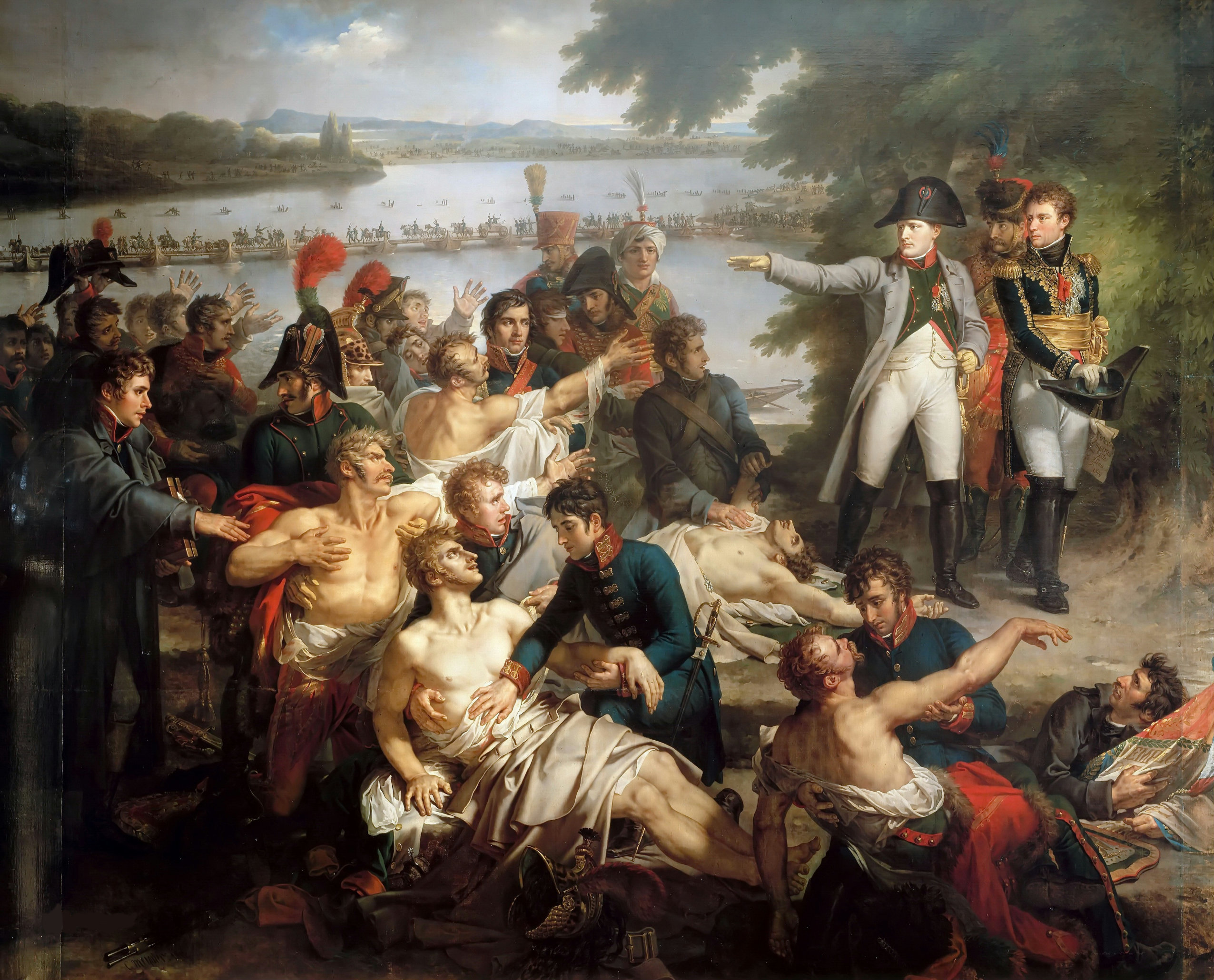
Napoleon's Return to the Island of Lobau After the Battle of Essling by Charles Meynier, 1812

The Battle of Aspern was Napoleon's first defeat and led to the death of Jean Lannes, one of his most trusted marshals and a key figure in his military campaigns. The fighting took place north of the Lobau on open fields and in nearby villages, particularly Aspern and Essling. After the battle, Napoleon retreated with his troops into the Lobau, which at the time was an island between the Danube branches, and set up his headquarters there for several weeks. On the night of July 5, 1809, Henri-Gatien Bertrand had several bridges built, allowing Napoleon to move 150,000 men to the left bank of the Danube in just a few hours. He then launched an immediate attack on the Austrian army and decisively defeated them at the Battle of Wagram.

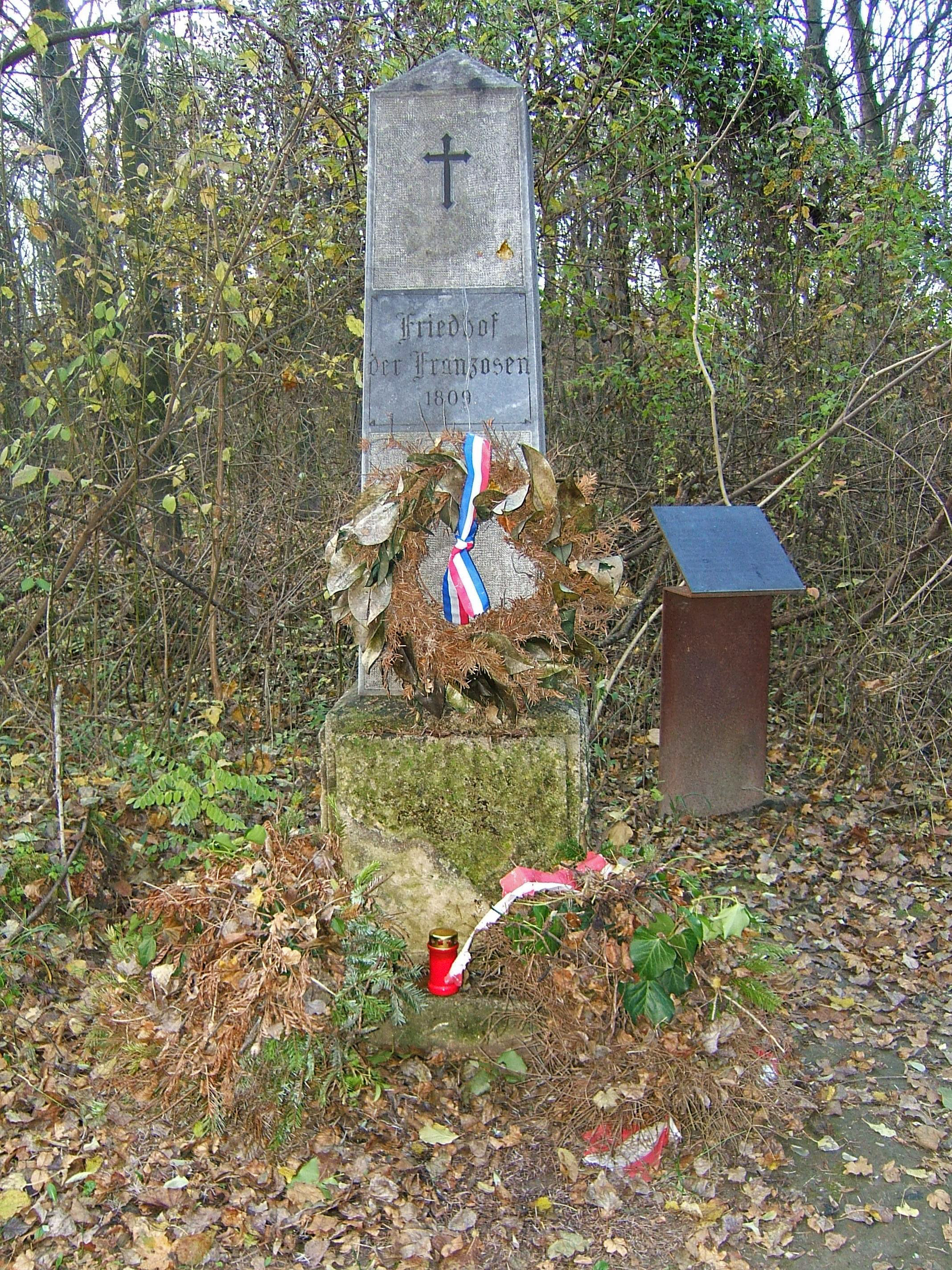
French cemetery

Today, locations like Napoleonstraße, monuments at Napoleon's headquarters (near the Panozzalacke), Napoleon's powder magazine, the French cemetery, the French crossing (south of Groß-Enzersdorf), and the Lion of Aspern commemorate the battle. In Paris, the Rue de Lobau by the Hôtel de Ville and the Avenue de Wagram, which leads to the Arc de Triomphe, are named in remembrance of the battle and the subsequent victory.

=== Danube regulation ===
Following the Danube regulation in 1870, many of the river's side arms and floodplains in Vienna were filled in or developed, especially on the southern bank. In contrast, the northern bank, farther from the city, faced less urban pressure, allowing the Lobau to remain a preserved area for hunting, forestry, and agriculture, eventually becoming a popular recreational space.

Historically, the Lobau was a royal hunting reserve, frequently visited by Crown Prince Rudolf. In 1903, Emperor Franz Joseph I. and King Edward VII of Britain embarked on a hunting trip there. In 1905, the Lobau was designated as a protected area, and in 1918, Emperor Charles I. gifted the Upper Lobau to the city of Vienna.

=== Development ===
The concept of a Danube-Oder Canal through the Lobau dates back to 1719, with construction commencing in 1939 during the Nazi era. By the time work was halted, 4.2 kilometers of navigable canal had been completed. The Lobau Oil Harbor was established, including a refinery and large tank storage facilities. The canal split the Lobau into the Upper and Lower Lobau, with the Lower Lobau remaining largely untouched and natural, while the Upper Lobau was developed for agriculture. Forced laborers, primarily Soviet prisoners and Jews, were used in the construction of the refinery, which became a target of bombing raids.

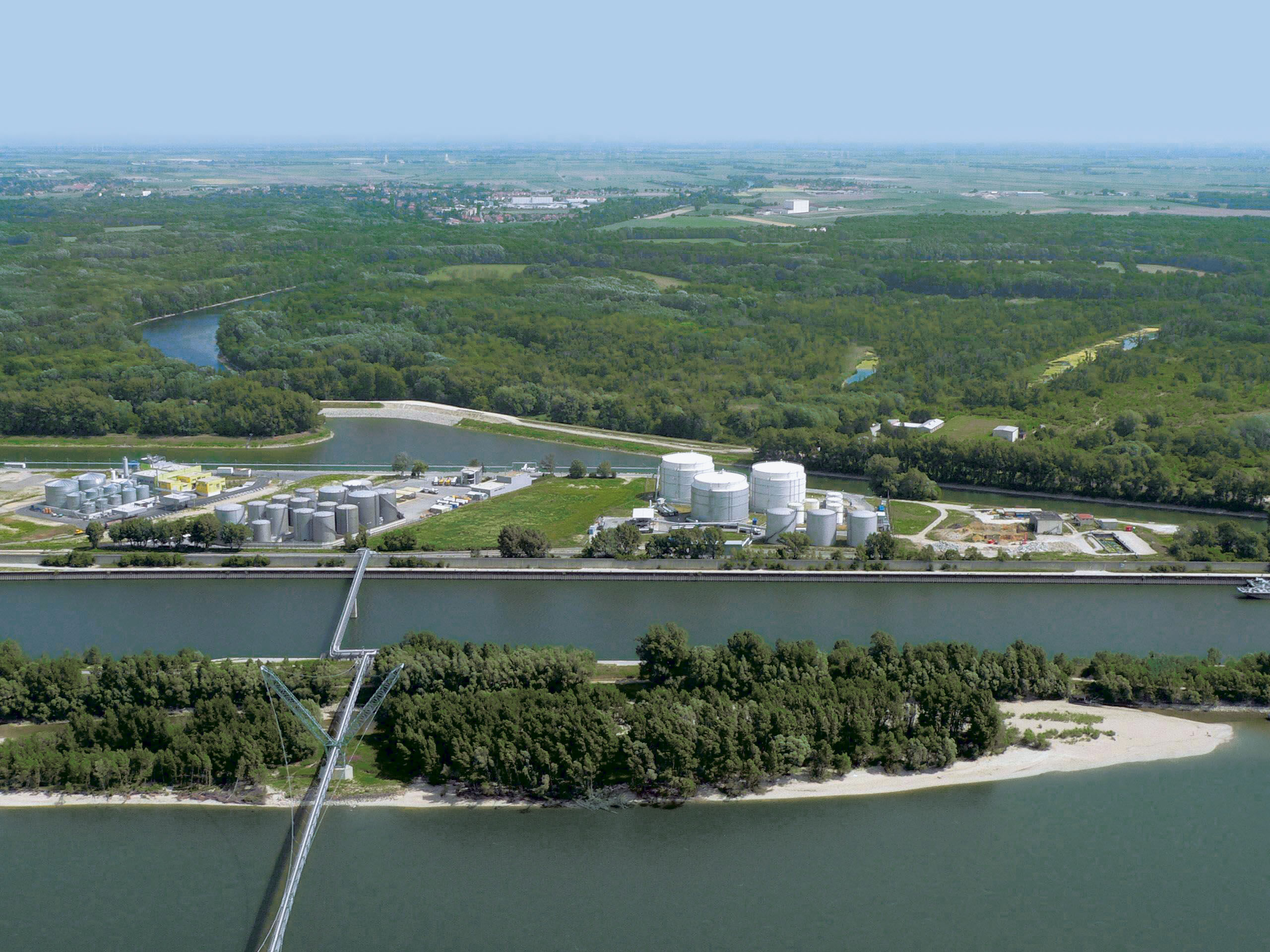
The oil refinery with the Lobau in the background and the tip of the Donauinsel in the foreground.

In addition, small areas of the Lobau were used for military exercises. The Lobau Groundwater Works, which provides Vienna with drinking water during peak demand, was also constructed in the area.

=== Conservation ===
The Lobau is a crucial refuge for endangered species and was designated a UNESCO Biosphere Reserve from 1977 to 2016. Since 1978, it has been a nature reserve, with a landscape protection area extending to Aspern, protecting a quarter of Donaustadt.

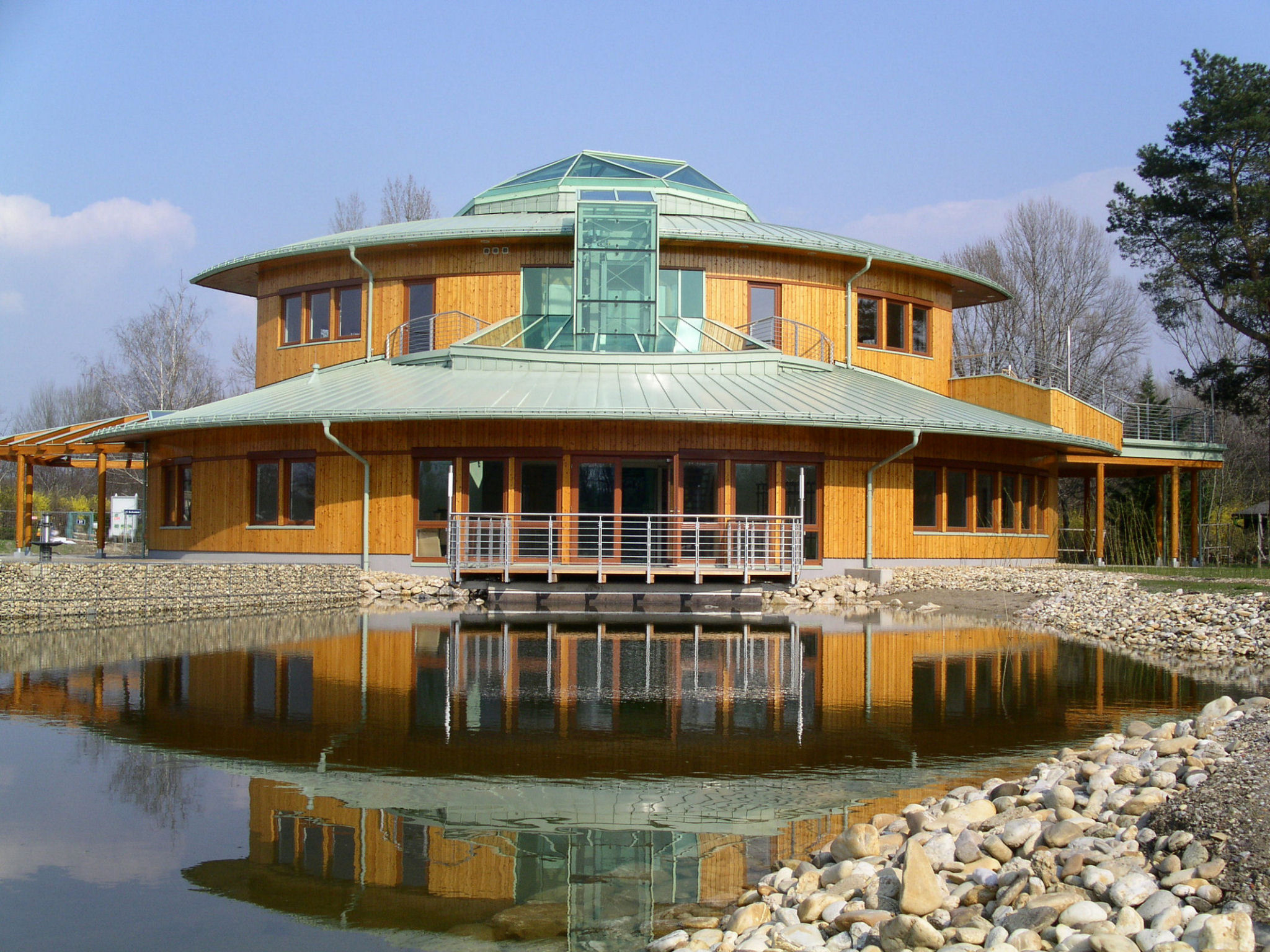
National park house

In 1983, the Lower Lobau was designated a Ramsar Wetland area. Since 1996, the Lobau has been part of the Danube-Auen National Park, which extends downstream into Lower Austria, creating an ecological corridor with other protected areas. The Lobau is also connected to the Ramsar areas in Slovakia and the Czech Republic, forming a trilateral cross-border Ramsar area.

== Leisure ==
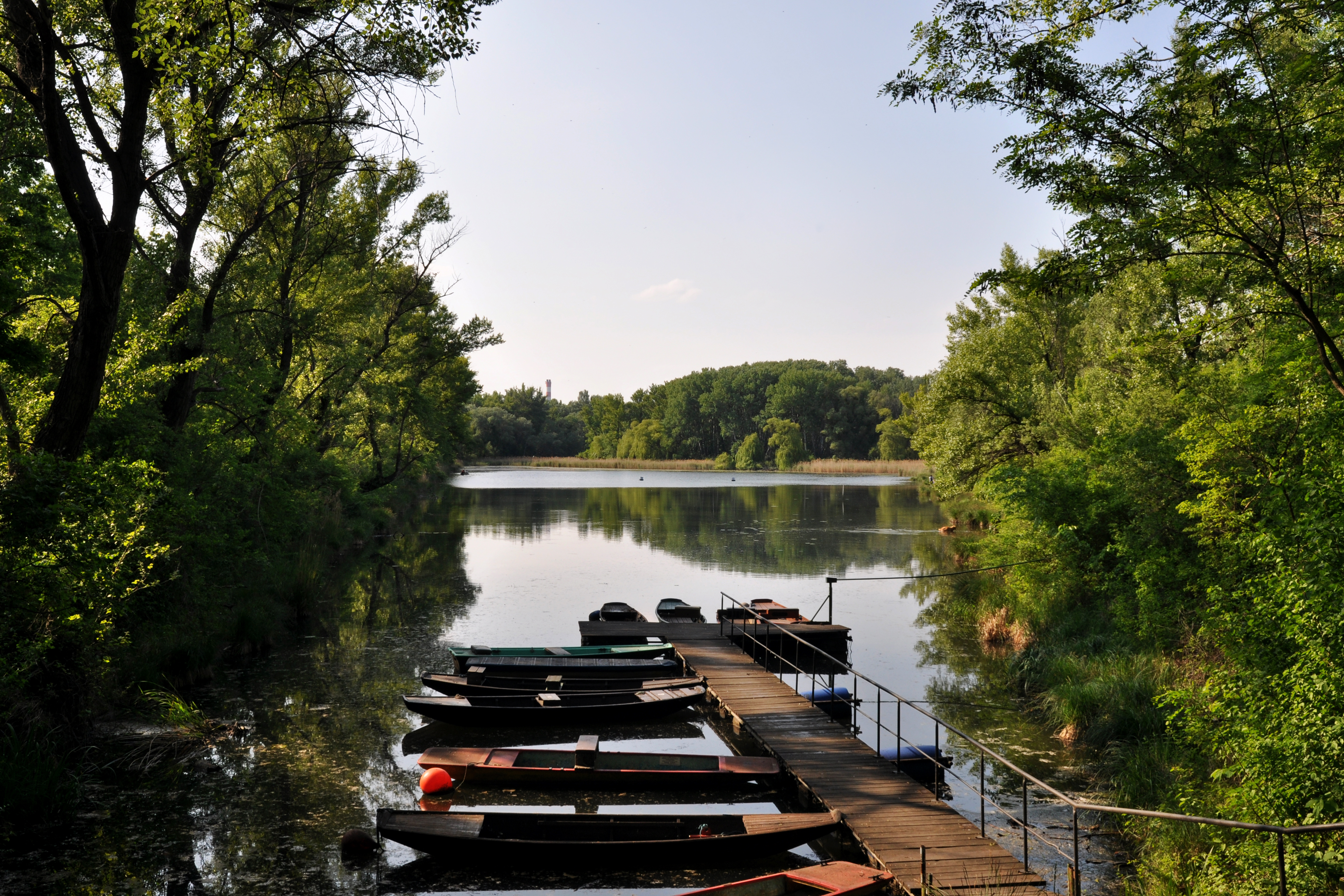
The Panozzalacke

After World War I, the Lobau became a popular recreational area. Tram line 317 from Kagran transported people there, where they could enjoy long hikes and spend relaxing days by the water without encountering large crowds. In the 1920s, naturism, whether officially permitted or not, took off in the Lobau. Along its old river arms, naturist groups established meeting spots that continue to exist to this day. The Dechantlacke and Panozzalacke are popular swimming spots in the Lobau. A nature trail called Obere Lobau was established in the national park area. It runs from the park entrance at Saltenstraße to the entrance at Dechantweg. The Lobau is connected by numerous hiking trails, including the long-distance Ostösterreichischer Grenzlandweg and the European long-distance trails E4 and E8.

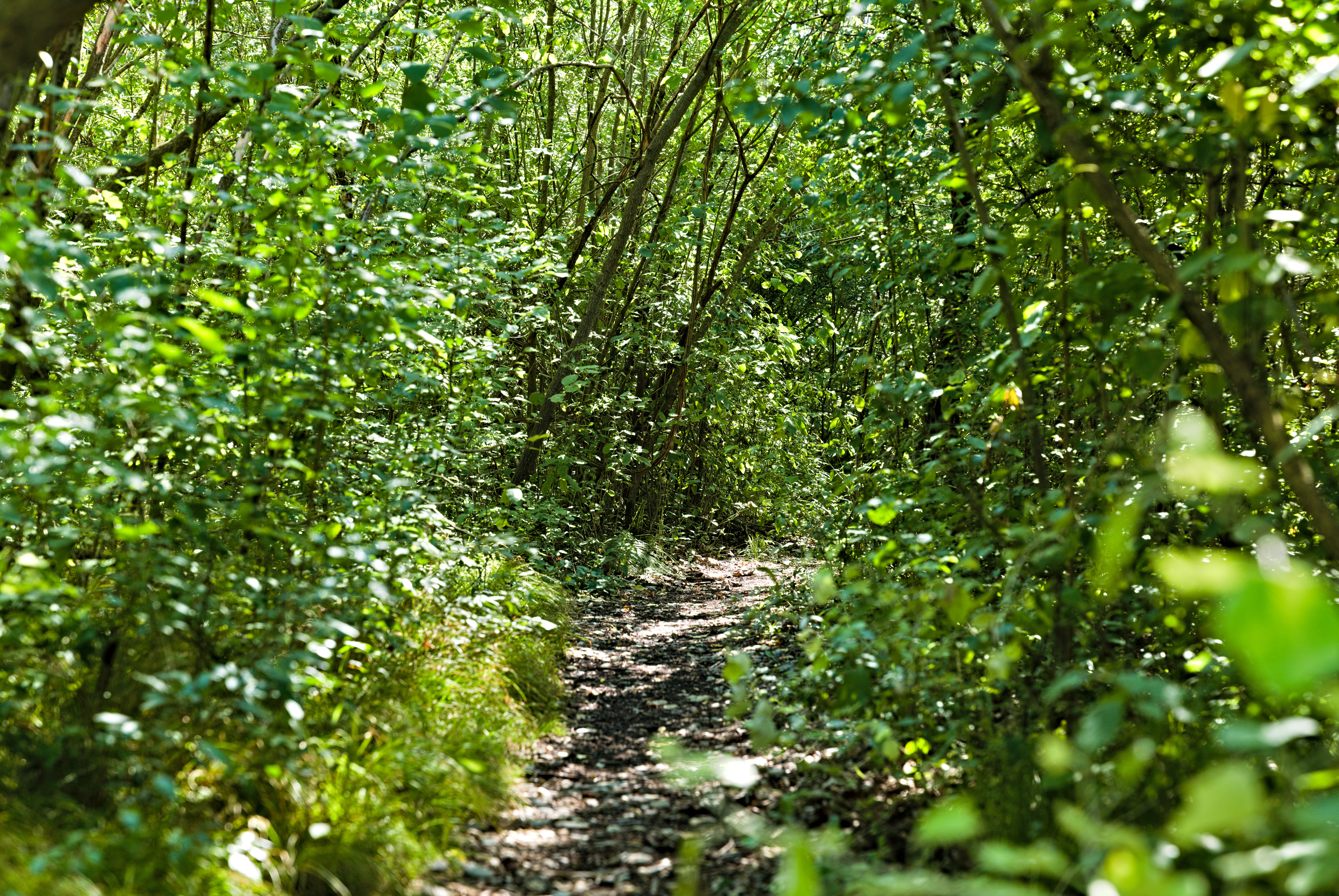
A trail in the Lobau

== Ecology ==
The straightening of the river through the Danube regulation altered the Lobau's hydrology. The formerly flood-prone landscape transitioned into a groundwater-fed wetland, while many of the Danube's main and side arms became stagnant water bodies, gradually filling with sediment. The reduction in large-scale flooding and natural water flow disrupted ecological connections between the river and its floodplain, leading to a steady decline in groundwater and surface water levels.

The Lower Lobau has been experiencing rapid desiccation and sedimentation. A noticeable drop in water levels can be observed in the receding groundwater table and the frequent drying out of surface waters. These changes are largely attributed to river regulation efforts and the deepening of the Danube's riverbed, a process intensified by hydropower development. Additionally, sediment deposits in floodplain waters, shifts in the Danube's flow patterns, and inadequate water management have further altered the ecosystem. As water levels decline, the region's biodiversity is also diminishing.

=== Water ===
The oxbow lakes and ponds occasionally dry out completely. These standing or slow-flowing bodies of water support diverse plant communities, some of whom are highly endangered. Many of these species have adapted to the changes in water levels. During particularly dry years, the receding water creates extensive mudflats, which are subsequently colonized by specialized plant and animal species.

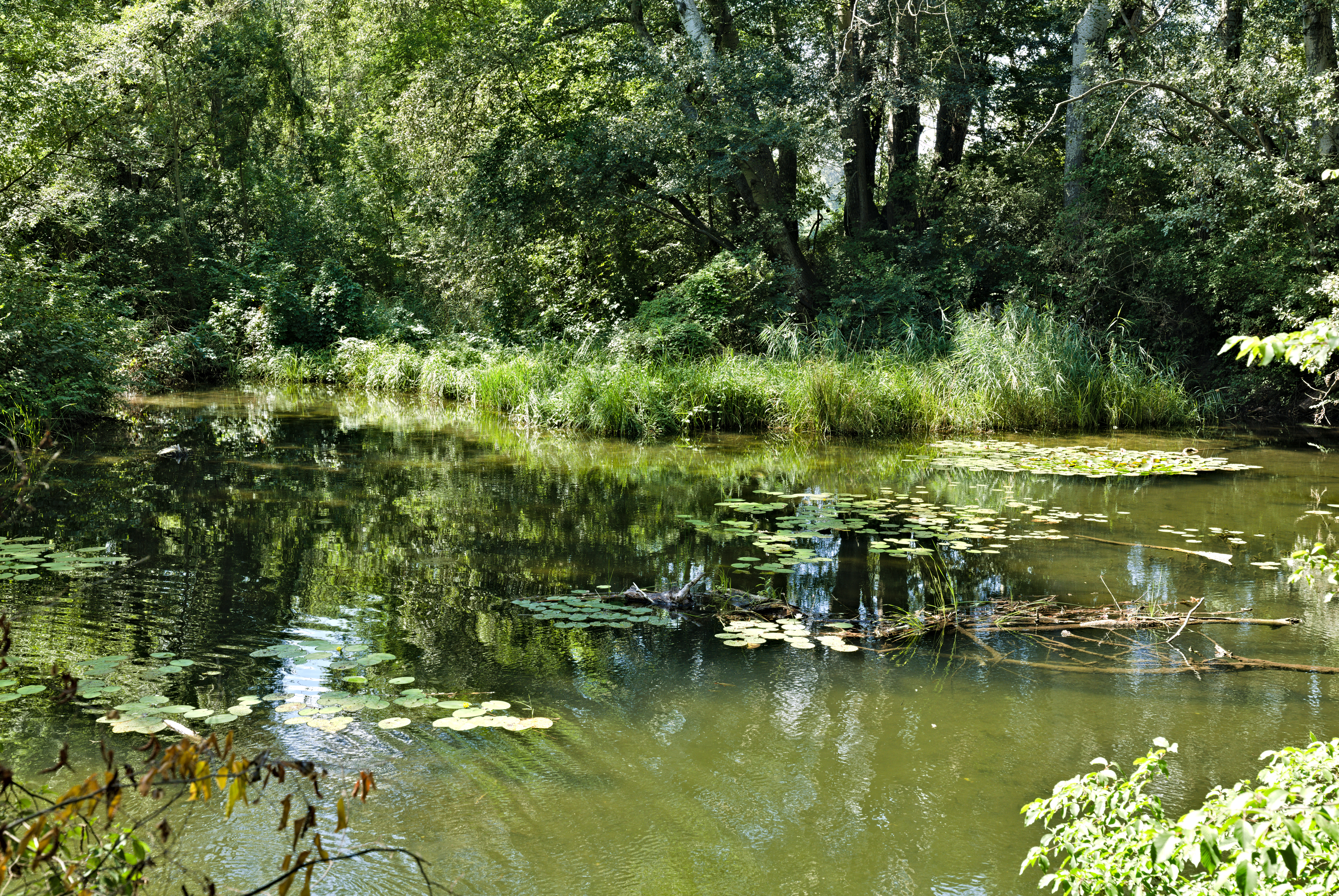
A pond in the Lobau

Endangered aquatic plants in the region include water violet (Hottonia palustris), various pondweed species (Potamogeton spp.), water chestnut (Trapa natans), water crowfoot (Ranunculus aquatilis), and the carnivorous bladderwort (Utricularia). Plants adapted to temporarily dry shorelines include spikerush (Eleocharis), mudwort (Limosella), beggarticks (Bidens), and club-rush (Schoenoplectus).

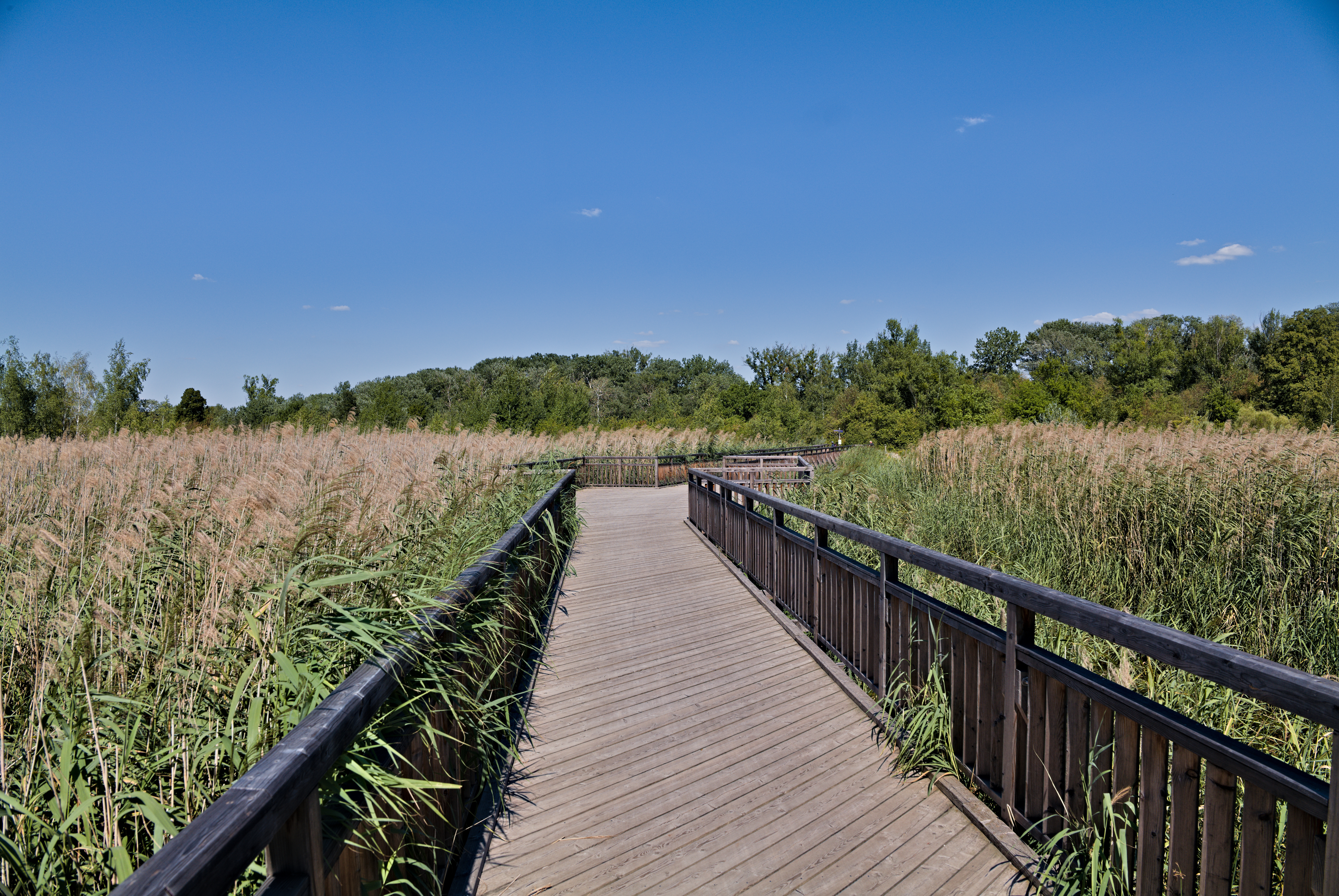
The Josefsteg

The Josefsteg is a 135-meter-long pedestrian bridge in Vienna's Lobau area, spanning the Schröderwasser. It is surrounded by a sea of common reed (Phragmites australis). The bridge was rebuilt in 2020.

=== Fauna ===
==== Softwood riparian forests ====
On newly deposited sand or gravel, influenced by the type of substrate and its proximity to the river, an initial plant cover establishes itself. This process marks the onset of typical wetland succession. The succession typically begins with herbaceous vegetation, followed by the growth of willow shrubs, and ultimately leads to the development of wetland forest trees, resulting in the formation of softwood riparian forests.

These forests are primarily composed of light-demanding deciduous trees, such as willows (Salix spp.) and poplars (Populus spp.), which require open, unshaded areas to thrive. Common species include white willow (Salix alba), crack willow (Salix fragilis), European ash (Fraxinus excelsior), black poplar (Populus nigra), and white poplar (Populus alba).

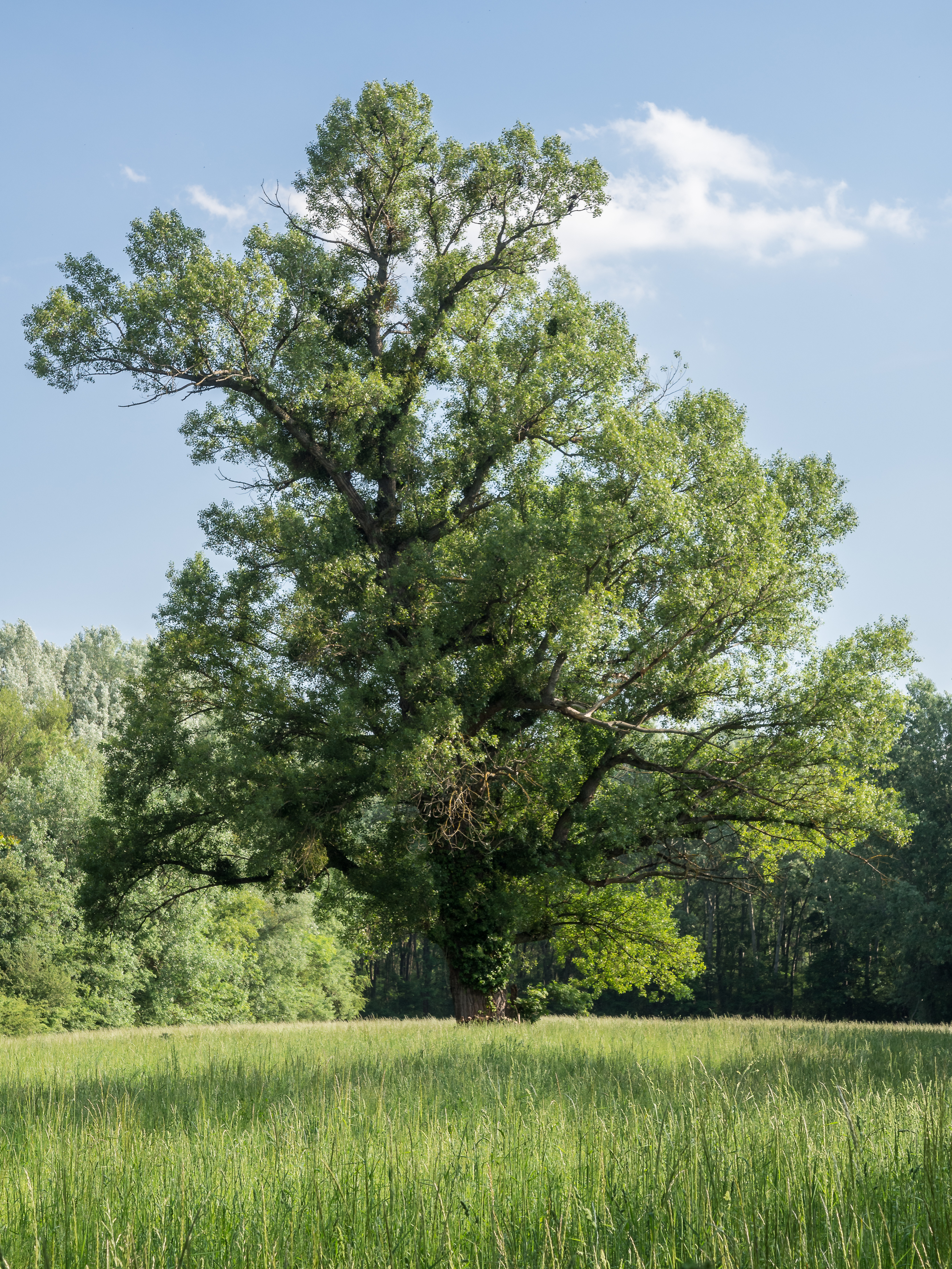
A poplar

==== Hardwood riparian forests ====
If an area is no longer subject to periodic flooding by the river, different tree species may gradually establish themselves on the mature wetland soils over several generations. Although flooding becomes less frequent, the area remains influenced by the river, with its ecological characteristics strongly affected by fluctuations in groundwater levels driven by the Danube's high and low water events.

Typical tree species in these forests include the fluttering elm (Ulmus laevis), field elm (Ulmus minor), ash (Fraxinus excelsior), small-leaved lime (Tilia cordata), pedunculate oak (Quercus robur), and white poplar (Populus alba). These habitats support a variety of specialized species, including beetles and their larvae, which live in the decaying wood of trees and shrubs. The tree stumps and dead trees are particularly important for bird life.

==== Dry gravel terraces (Heißländen) ====
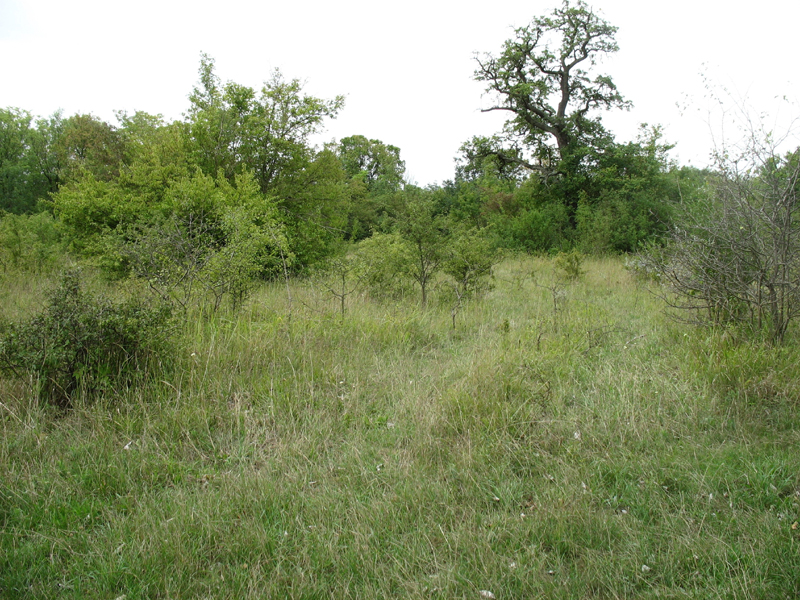
Heißländer

Heißländen are savanna-like habitats that develop on thick gravel deposits in the Lobau. Trees grow only where the soil layer is deep enough and retains sufficient moisture. These areas are relatively common in the Lobau but can be extremely dry in some locations.

The floodplains feature distinctive steppe-like dry gravel terraces known as Heißländen. These areas, formed on deep gravel deposits, have limited water availability, allowing only drought-tolerant plants to thrive. Typical species found here include hawthorn (Crataegus), sea buckthorn (Hippophae rhamnoides), various orchids, barberry (Berberis), and feather grass. Lichens and mosses, which can withstand dry conditions, are also common. The praying mantis, an insect native to extremely dry environments, is another notable species found in these habitats.

== Wildlife ==
The Lobau supports a diverse range of flora and fauna due to its dynamic floodplain ecosystem. Seasonal flooding and varied habitats, including wetlands, forests, and river arms, create favorable conditions for numerous species.

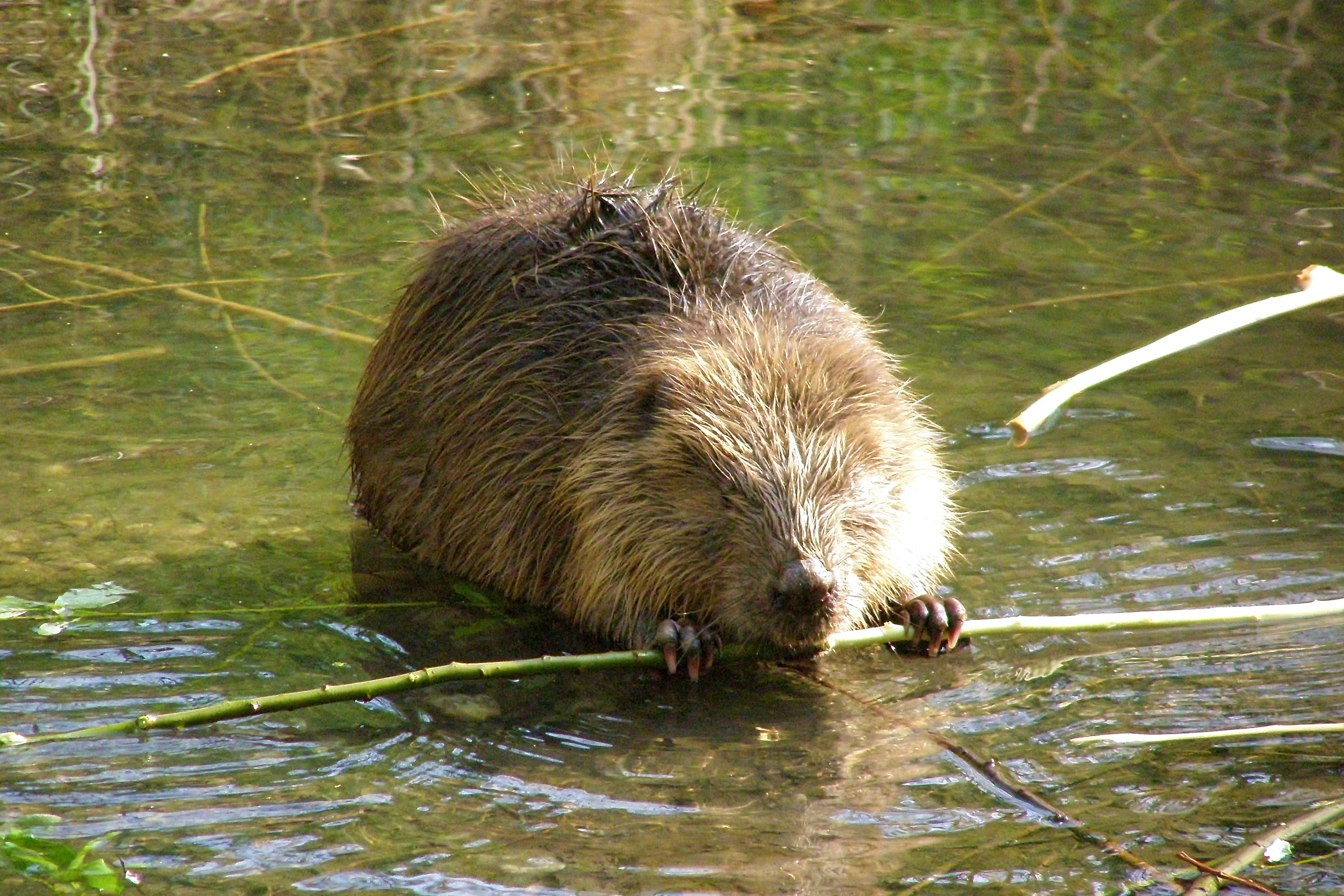
A Eurasian beaver

=== Mammals ===
The Lobau provides habitat for over 30 species of mammals. One of the most notable is the Eurasian beaver (Castor fiber), which was reintroduced in the 1970s after having been extirpated from Austria. Other mammals found in the area include wild boar (Sus scrofa), European otter (Lutra lutra), roe deer (Capreolus capreolus), Eurasian water shrew (Neomys fodiens), red fox (Vulpes vulpes), and European hare (Lepus europaeus). Several bat species also inhabit the region, such as the common noctule (Nyctalus noctula), Natterer's bat (Myotis nattereri), and Daubenton's bat (Myotis daubentonii).

=== Reptiles and amphibians ===
The wetlands and forests of the Lobau provide a suitable habitat for a variety of reptiles and amphibians. Among the reptiles found in the area are the European pond turtle (Emys orbicularis), slow worm (Anguis fragilis), Aesculapian snake (Zamenis longissimus), dice snake (Natrix tessellata), grass snake (Natrix natrix), and smooth snake (Coronella austriaca). Amphibians in the region include the European tree frog (Hyla arborea), agile frog (Rana dalmatina), European fire-bellied toad (Bombina bombina), and Danube crested newt (Triturus dobrogicus).

=== Fish ===
The waterways of the Lobau also support diverse fish species, such as the European bitterling (Rhodeus amarus), common carp (Cyprinus carpio), pigo (Rutilus pigus), and European mudminnow (Umbra krameri).

=== Birds ===
The Lobau serves as a key stopover and wintering site for migratory birds. Fish-eating species include the great cormorant (Phalacrocorax carbo), grey heron (Ardea cinerea), and common kingfisher (Alcedo atthis). Birds of prey found in the area include the red kite (Milvus milvus), white-tailed eagle (Haliaeetus albicilla), and European honey buzzard (Pernis apivorus). Other notable species include the middle spotted woodpecker (Dendrocoptes medius) and the sand martin (Riparia riparia).

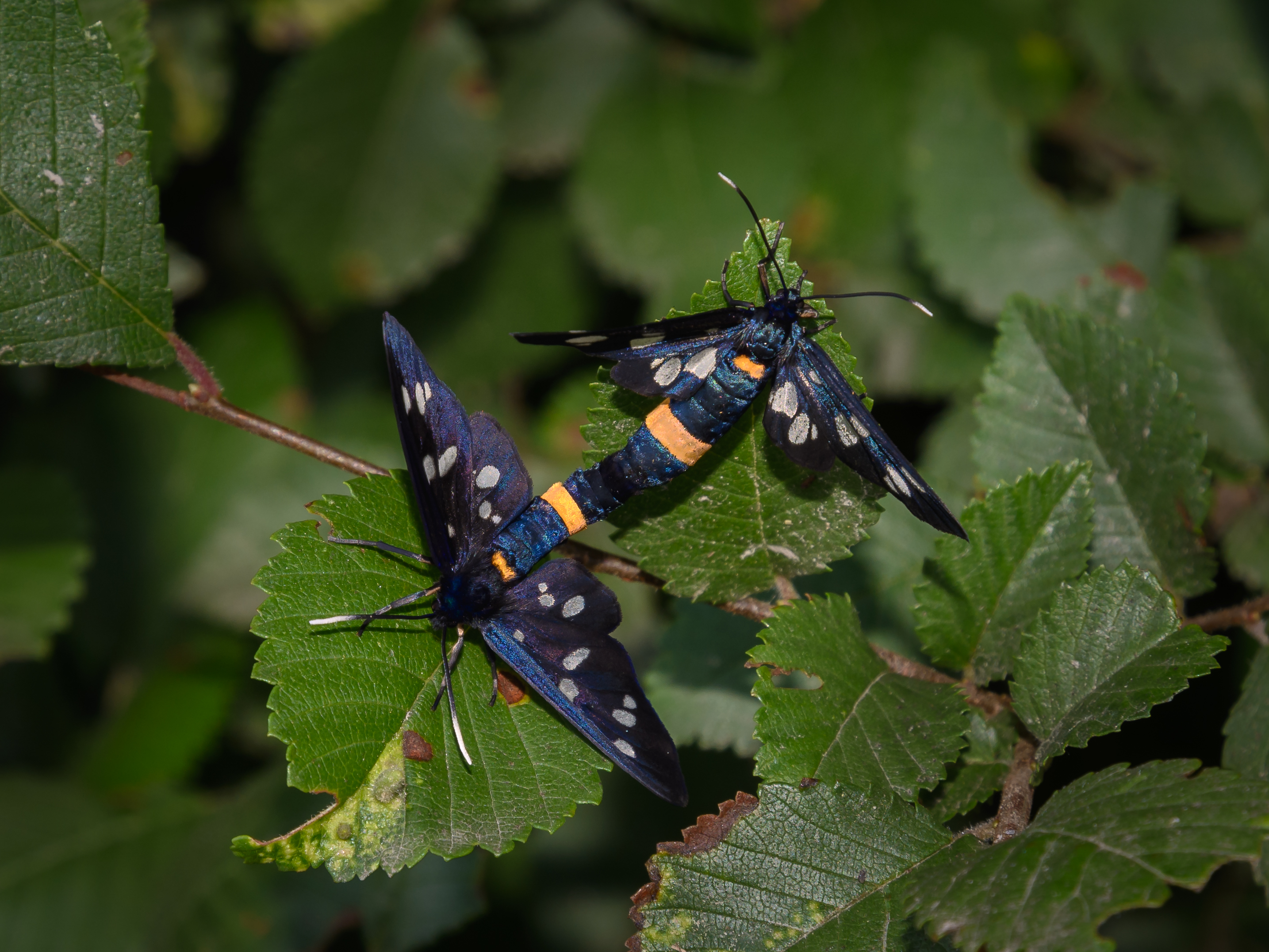
Two nine-spotted moths

=== Invertebrates ===
The Lobau is home to a wide range of invertebrates, including mollusks, crustaceans, arachnids, and insects. Mollusks found in the area include the duck mussel (Anodonta anatina), great pond snail (Lymnaea stagnalis), and Lister's river snail (Viviparus contectus). The noble crayfish (Astacus astacus) represents the region's crustaceans, while arachnids include the zebra spider (Salticus scenicus) and the tarantula wolf spider (Lycosa singoriensis).

The insect population is particularly diverse, featuring species such as the dragonflies green snaketail (Ophiogomphus cecilia) and Eurasian baskettail (Epitheca bimaculata), the southern festoon butterfly (Zerynthia polyxena), the European mantis (Mantis religiosa), the water strider (Gerridae), and the stag beetle (Lucanidae).
