= Army of Germany (1809) =

French Empire military formation

The Army of Germany or Armée d'Allemagne was a military formation of the First French Empire during the War of the Fifth Coalition in 1809.

The Army of Germany was distinct from the Grande Armée (Great Army) of the preceding Coalition Wars, which the Emperor Napoleon I had disbanded in October 1808. In a letter to General Louis-Alexandre Berthier dated 8 April 1809, Napoleon describes the new army's creation: "from 1 April, all the troops that I have in Germany will be known under the title Armée d'Allemagne, of which I reserve to myself the command in chief." He goes on to name its officers and describe its composition.

At its formation, the Army of Germany's French units were scattered in cantonments throughout France's allies in the Confederation of the Rhine. The cavalry reserve had not been formed and the Imperial Guard assigned to it was still en route from Spain. Besides French units, the army incorporated many German units from France's allies. It took days to muster the army at its assigned places, and this was not complete at the start of the war on 10 April. Berthier was de facto in command until Napoleon arrived at headquarters in Donauwörth on 17 April.

The total strength of the Army of Germany was about 160,000, with a higher proportion of conscripts than the Grande Armée of 1804–1808, with which its performance has been unfavourably compared. It was short on equipment and structurally incomplete at the start of hostilities, but, after a setback at Aspern-Essling, it won the war at Wagram.
