= List of battles involving France in modern history =

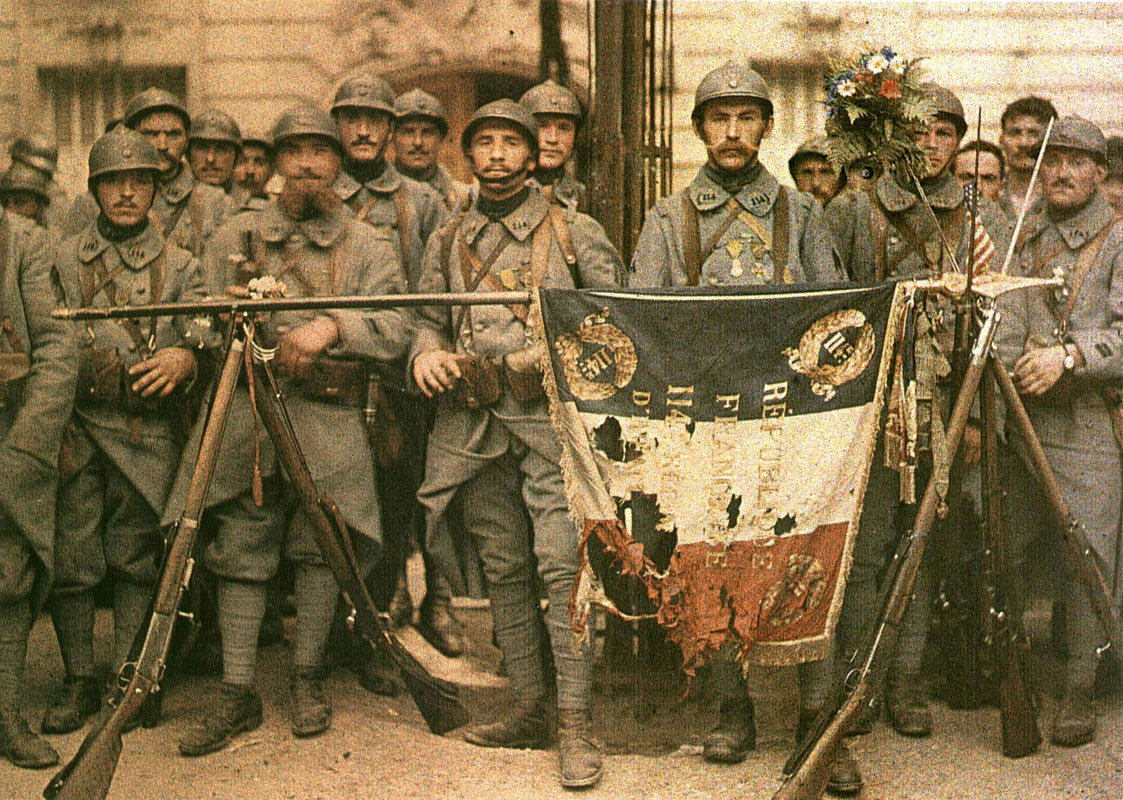
Poilus posing with their war-torn flag in 1917, during World War I (1914–1918).

This is a chronological list of the battles involving France in modern history.

These lists do not include the battles of the French civil wars (as the Wars of Religion, the Fronde, the War in the Vendée) unless a foreign country is involved; this list includes neither the peacekeeping operations (such as Operation Artemis, Opération Licorne) nor the humanitarian missions supported by the French Armed Forces.

The list gives the name, the date, the present-day location of the battles, the French allies and enemies, and the result of these conflicts following this legend:

French military victory
French military defeat
Indecisive or unclear outcome
Ongoing conflict

== Modern history (1789–present) ==
=== National Convention (1792–1795) ===
Battle	Date	Location	Allies	Enemies	Result
War of the First Coalition (1792–1797)
Capture of Porrentruy	28 April 1792	Switzerland	None	(Habsburg monarchy) Habsburg Empire	Victory
1st Battle of Quiévrain	28 April 1792	Belgium	None	(Habsburg monarchy) Habsburg Empire	Victory
Battle of Marquain	29 April 1792	Belgium	None	(Habsburg monarchy) Habsburg Empire	Defeat
2nd Battle of Quiévrain	30 April 1792	Belgium	None	(Habsburg monarchy) Habsburg Empire	Defeat
Battle of Harelbeke	23 June 1792	Belgium	None	(Habsburg monarchy) Habsburg Empire	Defeat
Capture of Longwy	19–23 August 1792	France	None	Prussia	Defeat
Siege of Thionville	24 August – 30 September 1792	France	None	(Habsburg monarchy) Habsburg Empire (Kingdom of France) Émigrés	Victory
Battle of Valmy	12 September 1792	France	None	Prussia (Habsburg monarchy) Habsburg Empire (Kingdom of France) Émigrés	Victory
Siege of Lille	29 September – 8 October 1792	France	None	(Habsburg monarchy) Habsburg Empire	Victory
First Siege of Mayence	19–21 October 1792	Germany	None	Electorate of Mainz	Victory
Battle of Jemappes	6 November 1792	Belgium	None	(Habsburg monarchy) Habsburg Empire	Victory
Siege of Namur	19 November – 1 December 1792	Belgium	None	(Habsburg monarchy) Habsburg Empire	Victory
Battle of Neerwinden	18 March 1793	Belgium	None	(Habsburg monarchy) Habsburg Empire	Defeat
Siege of Coné	8 April – 12 July 1793	France	None	Austria	Defeat
Second Siege of Mayence	10 April – 23 July 1793	Germany	None	Prussia Austria Saxony Hesse-Kassel Hesse-Darmstadt Electorate of the Palatinate (Electorate of Saxony) Saxe-Weimar	Defeat
Battle of Raismes	8 May 1793	France	None	(Holy Roman Empire) Austria Great Britain (Kingdom of Prussia) Prussia	Defeat
Battle of Famars	23 May 1793	France	None	(Habsburg monarchy) Habsburg Austria (Province of Hanover) Hanover Great Britain	Defeat
Capture of San Pietro and Sant'Antioco	25 May 1793	Italy	None	Spain	Defeat
First Battle of Arlon	9 June 1793	Belgium	None	(Habsburg monarchy) Habsburg Austria	Victory
Siege of Valenciennes	13 June – 28 July 1793	France	None	Austria Great Britain	Defeat
Action of 18 June 1793	18 June 1793	English Channel	None	Great Britain	Defeat
Action of 31 July 1793	31 July 1793	France	None	Great Britain	Indecisive
Siege of Dunkirk	24 August – 8 September 1793	France	None	Great Britain Austria (Province of Hanover) Hanover Hesse-Kassel	Victory
Battle of Hondshoote	8 September 1793	France	None	Great Britain (Habsburg monarchy) Archduchy of Austria Hesse-Kassel (Province of Hanover) Hanover	Victory
Battle of Avesnes-le-Sec	12 September 1793	France	None	Austria	Defeat
Battle of Méribel	13 September 1793	France	None	Sardinia	Victory
Siege of Toulon	18 September – 18 December 1793	France	None	Great Britain Spain (Kingdom of France) French Royalists (Kingdom of the Two Sicilies) Naples and Sicily Sardinia	Victory
First Battle of Wissembourg	13 October 1793	France	None	Austria Hesse-Kassel (Kingdom of France) Émigrés	Defeat
Battle of Wattignies	16 October 1793	France	None	Austria	Victory
Battle of Kaiserslautern	28–30 November 1793	Germany	None	Prussia	Defeat
Battle of Woerth-Froeschwiller	22 December 1793	France	None	Austria	Victory
Battle of Geisberg	26 December 1793	France	None	Austria Prussia	Victory
Second Battle of Wissembourg	26 – 27 December 1793	France	None	Austria Prussia Electorate of Bavaria Hesse-Kassel	Victory
Battle of Martinique	5 February 1794	Martinique	None	Great Britain	Defeat
Siege of Saint-Florent	7–18 February 1794	France	None	Great Britain Corsica	Defeat
Siege of Bastia	4 April – 19 May 1794	France	None	Great Britain Corsica	Defeat
Invasion of Guadeloupe	11 April 1794 – 10 December 1794	Guadeloupe	None	Great Britain	Victory
Second Battle of Arlon	17–18 April 1794	Belgium	None	Austria	Victory
Battle of Villers-en-Cauchies	24 April 1794	France	None	(Holy Roman Empire) Habsburg Austria Great Britain	Defeat
Battle of Saorgio	24–28 April 1794	Italy	None	Kingdom of Sardinia (Holy Roman Empire) Habsburg Austria	Victory
Battle of Beaumont	26 April 1794	France	None	(Holy Roman Empire) Habsburg Austria Great Britain	Defeat
Battle of Mouscron	29 April 1794	Belgium	None	(Holy Roman Empire) Habsburg Austria (Province of Hanover) Hanover	Victory
Action of 5 May 1794	5 May 1794	Indian Ocean	None	Great Britain	Defeat
Action of 7 May 1794	5–7 May 1794	Atlantic Ocean	None	Great Britain	Defeat
Battle of Tourcoing	18 May 1794	France	None	Great Britain Austria (Province of Hanover) Hanover	Victory
Battle of Tournay	22 May 1794	Belgium	None	(Habsburg monarchy) Habsburg Austria Great Britain (Province of Hanover) Hanover	Defeat
Glorious First of June	1 June 1794	France	None	Great Britain	Indecisive
Battle of Fleurus	26 June 1794	Belgium	None	Habsburg Monarchy Dutch Republic Brunswick-Lüneburg Great Britain	Victory
Battle of Trippstadt	13 July 1794	France	None	Prussia (Electorate of Saxony) Saxony (Holy Roman Empire) Austria	Victory
Siege of Calvi	July – 10 August 1794	France	None	Kingdom of Great Britain (Corsica) Anglo-Corsican Kingdom	Defeat
Battle of Sprimont	18 September 1794	Belgium	None	(Habsburg monarchy) Habsburg Austria	Victory
Battle of Aldenhoven	2 October 1794	Germany	None	(Habsburg monarchy) Habsburg Austria	Victory
First Battle of Dego	21 September 1794	Italy	None	(Habsburg monarchy) Habsburg Austria	Victory
Action of 6 November 1794	6 November 1794	Atlantic Ocean	None	Great Britain	Victory
Siege of Luxembourg	22 November 1794 – 7 June 1795	Luxembourg	None	(Habsburg monarchy) Habsburg Austria	Victory
Action of 8 March 1795	8 March 1795	Mediterranean	None	Great Britain	Victory
Battle of Genoa	14 March 1795	Ligurian Sea	None	Kingdom of Great Britain (Kingdom of the Two Sicilies) Kingdom of Naples and Sicily	Defeat
Action of 10 April 1795	10–11 April 1795	Atlantic Ocean	None	Great Britain	Defeat
Battle of Groix	23 June 1795	France	None	Great Britain	Defeat
Battle of Quiberon	23 June – 21 July 1795	France	None	(Kingdom of France) Chouans (Kingdom of France) Émigrés Great Britain	Victory
Battle of Hyères Islands	13 July 1795	Mediterranean	None	Great Britain (Kingdom of the Two Sicilies) Naples and Sicily	Defeat
Battle of Île d'Yeu	26 August – 1 November 1795	France	None	(Kingdom of France) Émigrés Great Britain	Victory
Battle of Mainz	29 October 1795	Germany	None	(Habsburg monarchy) Habsburg Austria	Defeat
War of the Pyrenees (1793–1795)
Battle of Céret	20 April 1793	France	None	Spain	Defeat
Battle of Mas Deu	19 May 1793	France	None	Spain	Defeat
Siege of Bellegarde	23 May – 24 June 1793	France	None	Spain (Kingdom of France) Émigrés	Defeat
Battle of Peyrestortes	17 September 1793	France	None	Spain	Victory
Battle of Truillas	22 September 1793	France	None	Spain	Defeat
Capture of Fort-Dauphin	28–29 January 1794	Haiti	None	Spain	Defeat
Battle of Boulou	30 April 1794	France	None	Spain Portugal	Victory
Battle of the Baztan Valley	24 July 1794	Spain	None	Spain	Victory
Battle of San-Lorenzo de la Muga	13 August 1794	Spain	None	Spain Portugal	Victory
Battle of Orbaitzeta	15–17 October 1794	Spain	None	Spain (Kingdom of France) Émigrés	Victory
Battle of the Black Mountain	17–20 November 1794	Spain	None	Spain Portugal	Victory
Siege of Roses	28 November 1794 – 4 February 1795	Spain	None	Spain	Victory
Battle of the Gulf of Roses	14 February 1795	Gulf of Roses	None	Spain	Victory
Battle of Pontós	11 June 1795	Spain	None	Spain	Defeat

=== Directory (1795–1799) ===
Battle	Date	Location	Allies	Enemies	Result
War of the First Coalition (1792–1797)
Battle of Ettlingen	9 July 1796	Germany	None	(Habsburg monarchy) Habsburg Austria	Victory
Battle of Neresheim	11 August 1796	Germany	None	(Habsburg monarchy) Habsburg Austria	Victory
Battle of Amberg	24 August 1796	Germany	None	(Habsburg monarchy) Habsburg Austria	Defeat
Battle of Friedberg	24 August 1796	Germany	None	(Habsburg monarchy) Habsburg Austria	Victory
Battle of Würzburg	3 September 1796	Germany	None	(Habsburg monarchy) Habsburg Austria	Defeat
Battle of Biberach	2 October 1796	Germany	None	(Habsburg monarchy) Habsburg Austria	Victory
Battle of Emmendingen	19 October 1796	Germany	None	(Habsburg monarchy) Habsburg Austria	Defeat
Battle of Schliengen	24 October 1796	Germany	None	(Habsburg monarchy) Habsburg Austria	Defeat
Siege of Kehl	October 1796 – January 1797	Germany	None	(Habsburg monarchy) Habsburg Austria	Defeat
Action of 13 January 1797	13 January 1797	Bay of Biscay	None	Great Britain	Defeat
Battle of Fishguard	22–24 February 1797	Wales	None	Great Britain	Defeat
Battle of Neuwied	18 April 1797	Germany	None	(Habsburg monarchy) Habsburg Austria	Victory
Battle of Diersheim	20 April 1797	Germany	None	(Habsburg monarchy) Habsburg Austria	Victory
Italian campaigns of the French Revolutionary Wars (1796–1797)
Battle of Loano	22 November 1795	Italy	None	(Habsburg monarchy) Habsburg Austria Sardinia	Victory
Battle of Voltri	10 April 1796	Italy	None	(Habsburg monarchy) Habsburg Austria	Defeat
Battle of Montenotte	12 April 1796	Italy	None	(Habsburg monarchy) Habsburg Austria Sardinia	Victory
Battle of Millesimo	13 April 1796	Italy	None	(Habsburg monarchy) Habsburg Austria Sardinia	Victory
Second Battle of Dego	14–15 April 1796	Italy	None	(Habsburg monarchy) Habsburg Austria Sardinia	Victory
Battle of Ceva	16 April 1796	Italy	None	Sardinia	Victory
Battle of Mondovì	21 April 1796	Italy	None	Sardinia	Victory
Battle of Fombio	7–9 May 1796	Italy	None	(Habsburg monarchy) Habsburg Austria	Victory
Battle of Lodi	10 May 1796	Italy	None	(Habsburg monarchy) Habsburg Austria	Victory
Battle of Borghetto	30 May 1796	Italy	None	(Habsburg monarchy) Habsburg Austria	Victory
Siege of Mantua	4 July 1796 – 2 February 1797	Italy	None	(Habsburg monarchy) Habsburg Austria	Victory
Battle of Lonato	2–3 August 1796	Italy	None	(Habsburg monarchy) Habsburg Austria	Victory
Battle of Castiglione	5 August 1796	Italy	None	(Habsburg monarchy) Habsburg Austria	Victory
Battle of Rovereto	4 September 1796	Italy	None	(Habsburg monarchy) Habsburg Austria	Victory
Battle of Bassano	8 September 1796	Italy	None	(Habsburg monarchy) Habsburg Austria	Victory
Battle of La Favorita	15 September 1796	Italy	None	(Habsburg monarchy) Habsburg Austria	Victory
Second Battle of Bassano	6 November 1796	Italy	None	(Habsburg monarchy) Habsburg Austria	Defeat
Battle of Calliano	6–7 November 1796	Italy	None	(Habsburg monarchy) Habsburg Austria	Defeat
Battle of Caldiero	12 November 1796	Italy	None	(Habsburg monarchy) Habsburg Austria	Defeat
Battle of the Bridge of Arcole	15–17 November 1796	Italy	None	(Habsburg monarchy) Habsburg Austria	Victory
Battle of La Favorita	16 January 1797	Italy	None	(Habsburg monarchy) Habsburg Austria	Victory
Battle of Rivoli	14–15 January 1797	Italy	None	(Habsburg monarchy) Habsburg Austria	Victory
Battle of Faenza	3–4 February 1797	Italy	None	Papal States	Victory
Battle of Valvasone	16 March 1797	Italy	None	(Habsburg monarchy) Habsburg Austria	Victory
Battle of Tarvis	21–23 March 1797	Italy	None	(Habsburg monarchy) Habsburg Austria	Victory
Tyrol Invasion	20 March–8 May 1797	Austria	None	(Habsburg monarchy) Habsburg Austria Tyrolean people	Victory
Veronese Easters	17–25 April 1797	Italy	None	Veronese people	Victory
Irish Rebellion of 1798
Battle of Castlebar	27 August 1798	Ireland	(Leinster) United Irishmen	Great Britain	Victory
Battle of Collooney	5 September 1798	Ireland	(Leinster) United Irishmen	Great Britain	Victory
Battle of Ballinamuck	8 September 1798	Ireland	(Leinster) United Irishmen	Great Britain	Defeat
Battle of Killala	23 September 1798	Ireland	(Leinster) United Irishmen	Great Britain	Defeat
Battle of Tory Island	12 October 1798	Ireland	None	Great Britain	Defeat
Quasi-War
Capture of La Croyable	7 July 1798	New Jersey	None	United States	Defeat
Capture of USS Retaliation	20 November 1798	Guadeloupe	None	United States	Victory
USS Constellation vs L'Insurgente	9 February 1799	Nevis	None	United States	Defeat
French Campaign in Egypt and Syria (1798–1801)
Capture of Malta	9–11 June 1798	Malta	None	(Sovereign Military Order of Malta) Order of St. John	Victory
Battle of Chobrakit	12 July 1798	Egypt	None	Mamluks	Victory
Battle of the Pyramids	21 July 1798	Egypt	None	Ottoman Empire Mamluks	Victory
Battle of the Nile	1–2 August 1798	Egypt	None	Great Britain	Defeat
Siege of Malta	2 September 1798 – 4 September 1800	Malta	None	Great Britain Malta Portugal (Kingdom of the Two Sicilies) Naples	Defeat
Revolt of Cairo	21 October 1798	Egypt	None	Ottoman Empire	Victory
Action of 14 December 1798	14 December 1798	Gironde estuary	None	Great Britain	Victory
Siege of El Arish	8–19 February 1799	Egypt	None	Ottoman Empire	Victory
Siege of Jaffa	3–7 March 1799	Palestine	None	Ottoman Empire	Victory
Siege of Acre	20 March – 21 May 1799	Palestine	None	Ottoman Empire	Defeat
Battle of Mount Tabor	16 April 1799	Palestine	None	Ottoman Empire	Victory
First Battle of Abukir	25 July 1799	Egypt	None	Ottoman Empire	Victory
War of the Second Coalition (1798–1802)
Battle of Grauholz	5 March 1798	Switzerland	None	Switzerland	Victory
Siege of Corfu	18 November 1798 – 2 March 1799	Greece	None	Russian Empire; Ottoman Empire	Defeat
Battle of Ostrach	20–21 March 1799	Germany	None	(Holy Roman Empire) Habsburg monarchy	Defeat
Battle of Feldkirch	23 March 1799	Switzerland	None	(Holy Roman Empire) Habsburg monarchy	Victory
First Battle of Stockach	25 March 1799	Germany	None	(Holy Roman Empire) Habsburg monarchy	Defeat
Battle of Winterthur	27 May 1799	Switzerland	None	(Holy Roman Empire) Habsburg monarchy	Defeat
Battle of Oberwald	13–14 August 1799	Switzerland	None	(Holy Roman Empire) Habsburg monarchy	Victory
Battle of Schwyz	14–15 August 1799	Switzerland	None	(Holy Roman Empire) Habsburg monarchy	Defeat
First Battle of Zürich	4–7 June 1799	Switzerland	None	(Holy Roman Empire) Habsburg monarchy	Defeat
Battle of Krabbendam	10 September 1799	Netherlands	Batavian Republic	Great Britain	Defeat
Battle of Bergen	19 September 1799	Netherlands	Batavian Republic	Great Britain Russian Empire	Victory
Second Battle of Zürich	25–26 September 1799	Switzerland	None	(Holy Roman Empire) Austria Russia	Victory
Battle of Linth	25 September 1799	Switzerland	None	(Holy Roman Empire) Habsburg monarchy	Victory
Battle of Alkmaar	2 October 1799	Netherlands	Batavian Republic	Great Britain Russian Empire	Defeat
Battle of Castricum	6 October 1799	Netherlands	Batavian Republic	Great Britain Russian Empire	Victory

=== Consulate (1799–1804) ===
Battle	Date	Location	Allies	Enemies	Result
Quasi-War (1798–1800)
Action of 1 January 1800	1 January 1800	Haïti	None	United States	Indecisive
USS Constellation vs La Vengeance	1–2 February 1800	Saint Kitts	None	United States	Indecisive
Battle of Puerto Plata Harbor	11 May 1800	Dominican Republic	Spain	United States	Defeat
Invasion of Curaçao	22 July - 25 September 1800	Curaçao	None	United States Batavian Republic United Kingdom	Defeat
USS Boston vs Berceau	12 October 1800	Guadeloupe	None	United States	Defeat
USS Enterprise vs Flambeau	25 October 1800	Dominica	None	United States	Defeat
French Campaign in Egypt and Syria (1798–1801)
Battle of Heliopolis	20 March 1800	Egypt	None	Ottoman Empire	Victory
Second Battle of Abukir	8 March 1801	Egypt	None	United Kingdom	Defeat
Battle of Mandora	13 March 1801	Egypt	None	United Kingdom	Defeat
Battle of Alexandria	21 March 1801	Egypt	None	United Kingdom	Defeat
Siege of Fort Julien	8 – 19 April 1801	Egypt	None	United Kingdom Ottoman Empire	Defeat
Siege of Cairo	May – June 1801	Egypt	None	United Kingdom Ottoman Empire	Defeat
Siege of Alexandria	17 August – 2 September 1801	Egypt	None	United Kingdom	Defeat
War of the Second Coalition (1799–1802)
Battle of Wiesloch	3 December 1799	Germany	None	(Habsburg monarchy) Habsburg Austria	Defeat
Battle of Messkirch	4–5 May 1800	Germany	None	(Habsburg monarchy) Habsburg Austria	Victory
Battle of Engen	3 May 1800	Germany	None	(Habsburg monarchy) Habsburg Austria	Victory
Second Battle of Stockach	3 May 1800	Germany	None	(Habsburg monarchy) Habsburg Austria	Victory
Battle of Höchstädt	19 June 1800	Germany	None	(Habsburg monarchy) Habsburg Austria	Victory
Battle of Ampfing	1 December 1800	Germany	None	(Habsburg monarchy) Habsburg Austria	Defeat
Battle of Hohenlinden	3 December 1800	Germany	None	(Habsburg monarchy) Habsburg Austria Electorate of Bavaria	Victory
War of the Oranges	20 May – 9 June 1801	Portugal	Spain	Portugal	Victory
First Battle of Algeciras Bay	6 July 1801	Spain	Spain	United Kingdom	Victory
Second Battle of Algeciras Bay	12 July 1801	Spain	Spain	United Kingdom	Defeat
Raids on Boulogne	4 and 15–16 August 1801	English Channel	None	United Kingdom	Victory
French Campaign in Italy (1799–1800)
Battle of Magnano	5 April 1799	Italy	None	(Holy Roman Empire) Habsburg Austria	Defeat
Siege of Mantua	April – 4 July 1799	Italy	None	(Holy Roman Empire) Habsburg Austria	Defeat
Battle of Cassano	27 April 1799	Italy	None	Russia (Holy Roman Empire) Habsburg Austria	Defeat
Battle of Trebbia	17–19 June 1799	Italy	None	Russia (Holy Roman Empire) Habsburg Austria	Defeat
Battle of Novi	15 August 1799	Italy	None	Russia (Holy Roman Empire) Habsburg Austria	Defeat
Battle of Montebello	9 June 1800	Italy	None	(Holy Roman Empire) Habsburg Austria	Victory
Siege of Genoa	20 April – 4 June 1800	Italy	None	(Holy Roman Empire) Habsburg Austria	Victory
Battle of Marengo	14 June 1800	Italy	None	(Holy Roman Empire) Habsburg Austria	Victory
Battle of Pozzolo	25 December 1800	Italy	None	(Holy Roman Empire) Habsburg Austria	Victory
Haitian Revolution (1791–1804)
Saint-Domingue expedition	December 1801 – December 1802	Haïti	None	Haitian Rebels	Defeat
Battle of Vertières	18 November 1803	Haïti	None	Haitian Rebels	Defeat

=== First Empire (1804–1814/1815) ===
Battle	Date	Location	Allies	Enemies	Result
War of the Third Coalition (1803–1806)
Battle of Diamond Rock	31 May – 2 June 1805	Martinique	Spain	United Kingdom	Victory
Battle of Cape Finisterre	22 July 1805	Spain	Spain	United Kingdom	Defeat
Battle of Wertingen	8 October 1805	Germany	None	Austrian Empire	Victory
Battle of Haslach-Jungingen	11 October 1805	Germany	None	Austrian Empire	Victory
Battle of Elchingen	14 October 1805	Germany	None	Austrian Empire	Victory
Battle of Ulm	16–19 October 1805	Germany	None	Austrian Empire	Victory
Battle of Verona	18 October 1805	Italy	None	Austrian Empire	Victory
Battle of Trafalgar	21 October 1805	Spain	Spain	United Kingdom	Defeat
Battle of Caldiero	30 October 1805	Italy	None	Austrian Empire	Victory
Battle of Cape Ortegal	3 November 1805	Spain	None	United Kingdom	Defeat
Battle of Amstetten	5 November 1805	Austria	None	Austrian Empire Russian Empire	Victory
Battle of Mariazell	8 November 1805	Austria	None	Austrian Empire	Victory
Battle of Dürenstein	11 November 1805	Austria	None	Russian Empire Austrian Empire	Indecisive
Capitulation of Dornbirn	13 November 1805	Austria	None	Austrian Empire	Victory
Battle of Schöngrabern	16 November 1805	Austria	None	Austrian Empire Russian Empire	Victory
Battle of Castelfranco Veneto	24 November 1805	Italy	None	Austrian Empire	Victory
Battle of Austerlitz	2 December 1805	Czech Republic	None	Russian Empire Austrian Empire	Victory
Siege of Gaeta	26 February – 18 July 1806	Italy	(Kingdom of Italy (Napoleonic)) Italy (Kingdom of Italy (Napoleonic)) Etruria Polish Legions Switzerland	(Kingdom of the Two Sicilies) Kingdoms of Naples and Sicily	Victory
Action of 21 April 1806	21 April 1806	South Africa	None	United Kingdom	Indecisive
Battle of Maida	4 July 1806	Italy	(Kingdom of Italy (Napoleonic)) Italy (Kingdom of Italy (Napoleonic)) Etruria Polish Legions Switzerland	United Kingdom (Kingdom of the Two Sicilies) Kingdoms of Naples and Sicily	Defeat
Battle of Campo Tenese	10 March 1806	Italy	(Kingdom of Italy (Napoleonic)) Italy (Kingdom of Italy (Napoleonic)) Etruria Polish Legions Switzerland	(Kingdom of the Two Sicilies) Kingdoms of Naples and Sicily	Victory
Battle of Mileto	28 May 1806	Italy	None	(Kingdom of the Two Sicilies) Kingdoms of Naples and Sicily	Victory
War of the Fourth Coalition (1806–1807)
Battle of Schleiz	9 October 1806	Germany	None	Prussia	Victory
Battle of Saalfeld	10 October 1806	Germany	None	Kingdom of Prussia Electorate of Saxony	Victory
Battle of Jena	14 October 1806	Germany	None	Kingdom of Prussia Electorate of Saxony	Victory
Battle of Auerstaëdt	14 October 1806	Germany	None	Kingdom of Prussia	Victory
Capitulation of Erfurt	16 October 1806	Germany	None	Kingdom of Prussia	Victory
Battle of Halle	17 October 1806	Germany	None	Kingdom of Prussia	Victory
Siege of Magdeburg	25 October – 8 November 1806	Germany	None	Kingdom of Prussia	Victory
Capitulation of Berlin	27 October 1806	Germany	None	Kingdom of Prussia	Victory
Battle of Prenzlau	28 October 1806	Germany	None	Kingdom of Prussia	Victory
Capitulation of Pasewalk	29 October 1806	Germany	None	Kingdom of Prussia	Victory
Capitulation of Stettin	29–30 October 1806	Poland	None	Prussia	Victory
Battle of Waren-Nossentin	1 November 1806	Germany	None	Prussia	Defeat
Battle of Lübeck	6–7 November 1806	Germany	None	Prussia Sweden	Victory
Siege of Hameln	7–22 November 1806	Germany	None	Prussia	Victory
Greater Poland Uprising (1806)	November 1806	Poland	Polish Insurgents	Prussia	Victory
Battle of Czarnowo	23 December 1806	Poland	None	Russian Empire	Victory
Battle of Golymin	26 December 1806	Poland	None	Russian Empire	Victory
Battle of Pułtusk	26 December 1806	Poland	None	Russian Empire Kingdom of Prussia	Victory
Siege of Graudenz	22 January - 11 December 1807	Poland	Polish Insurgents	Prussia	Defeat
Battle of Mohrungen	25 January 1807	Poland	None	Russian Empire	Victory
Battle of Allenstein	3 February 1807	Poland	None	Russian Empire	Victory
Battle of Eylau	8 February 1807	Russia	None	Russian Empire Kingdom of Prussia	Victory
Battle of Ostrolenka	16 February 1807	Poland	None	Russian Empire	Victory
Siege of Kolberg	March – 2 July 1807	Poland	Kingdom of Italy Duchy of Warsaw Confederation of the Rhine	Kingdom of Prussia Sweden United Kingdom	Indecisive
Siege of Danzig	19 March – 24 May 1807	Poland	None	Kingdom of Prussia Russian Empire United Kingdom	Victory
Great Sortie of Stralsund	1–3 April 1807	Germany	None	Sweden	Defeat
Battle of Guttstadt-Deppen	5–6 June 1807	Poland	None	Russian Empire	Victory
Battle of Heilsberg	10 June 1807	Poland	None	Russian Empire	Victory
Battle of Friedland	14 June 1807	Russia	None	Russian Empire	Victory
Siege of Stralsund	28/30 January – 24 August 1807	Germany	None	Sweden	Victory
Peninsular War (1808–1814)
Invasion of Portugal	19–30 November 1807	Portugal	None	Portugal	Victory
Dos de Mayo Uprising	2 May 1808	Spain	None	Spain Madrileños	Victory
Battles of the Bruch	6–14 June 1808	Spain	None	Spain	Defeat
Battle of Cabezón	12 June 1808	Spain	None	Spain	Victory
Capture of the Rosily Squadron	9–14 June 1808	Spain	None	Spain	Defeat
Siege of Saragossa	15 June – 13 August 1808	Spain	Duchy of Warsaw	Spain	Defeat
Battle of Valencia	24–26 June 1808	Spain	None	Spain	Defeat
Battle of Medina de Rioseco	14 July 1808	Spain	None	Spain	Victory
Battle of Bailén	19–22 July 1808	Spain	None	Spain	Defeat
Battle of Évora	29 July 1808	Portugal	None	Portugal	Victory
Battle of Roliça	17 August 1808	Portugal	Switzerland	United Kingdom Portugal	Defeat
Battle of Vimeiro	20 August 1808	Portugal	None	United Kingdom Portugal	Defeat
Battle of Zornoza	31 October 1808	Spain	None	Spain	Indecisive
Battle of Valmaseda	5 November 1808	Spain	None	Spain	Defeat
Battle of Burgos	7 November 1808	Spain	None	Spain	Victory
Battle of Espinosa	10–11 November 1808	Spain	None	Spain	Victory
Battle of Tudela	23 November 1808	Spain	Duchy of Warsaw	Spain	Victory
Battle of Somosierra	30 November 1808	Spain	Duchy of Warsaw	Spain	Victory
Battle of Cardedeu	16 December 1808	Spain	None	Spain	Victory
Siege of Saragossa	20 December 1808 – 20 February 1809	Spain	Duchy of Warsaw Switzerland	Spain	Victory
Battle of Molins de Rei	21 December 1808	Spain	None	Spain	Victory
Battle of Sahagún	21 December 1808	Spain	None	United Kingdom	Defeat
Battle of Benavente	29 December 1808	Spain	None	United Kingdom	Defeat
Battle of Mansilla	30 December 1808	Spain	None	Spain	Victory
Battle of Castellón	1 January 1809	Spain	None	Spain	Defeat
Battle of Cacabelos	3 January 1809	Spain	None	United Kingdom	Victory
Battle of Uclés	13 January 1809	Spain	None	Spain	Victory
Battle of Corunna	16 January 1809	Spain	None	United Kingdom	Victory
Battle of Valls	25 February 1809	Spain	None	Spain	Victory
Battle of Villafranca	17 March 1809	Spain	None	Spain	Defeat
Battle of Medellín	28 March 1809	Spain	None	Spain	Victory
Battle of Braga	20 March 1809	Portugal	None	Portugal	Victory
Battle of Ciudad-Real	27 March 1809	Spain	Duchy of Warsaw	Spain	Victory
First Battle of Porto	28 March 1809	Portugal	None	Kingdom of Portugal	Victory
Siege of Gerona	6 May – 12 December 1809	Spain	None	Spain	Victory
Battle of Grijó	10–11 May 1809	Spain	None	United Kingdom Portugal	Defeat
Second Battle of Porto	12 May 1809	Spain	None	United Kingdom Portugal	Defeat
Battle of Alcántara	14 May 1809	Portugal	None	Kingdom of Portugal	Victory
Battle of María	15 June 1809	Spain	None	Spain	Victory
Battle of Belchite	18 June 1809	Spain	None	Spain	Victory
Battle of Talavera	27–28 July 1809	Spain	None	Spain United Kingdom	Indecisive
Battle of Arzobispo	8 August 1809	Spain	None	Spain	Victory
Battle of Almonacid	11 August 1809	Spain	None	Spain	Victory
Battle of Puerto de Baños	12 August 1809	Spain	None	Spain Portugal	Victory
Battle of Tamames	18 October 1809	Spain	None	Spain	Defeat
Battle of Ocana	19 November 1809	Spain	None	Spain	Victory
Battle of Alba de Tormes	28 November 1809	Spain	None	Spain	Victory
Siege of Cádiz	5 February 1810 – 24 August 1812	Spain	None	Spain United Kingdom Portugal	Defeat
Battle of Vich	20 February 1810	Spain	None	Spain	Victory
Siege of Astorga	21 March 1810	Spain	None	Spain	Victory
Siege of Lérida	29 April – 14 May 1810	Spain	None	Spain	Victory
Siege of Ciudad Rodrigo	26 April – 10 July 1810	Spain	None	Spain	Victory
Siege of Mequinenza	14 May – 18 June 1810	Spain	None	Spain	Victory
Combat of Barquilla	11 July 1810	Spain	None	United Kingdom Portugal	Victory
Battle of the Côa	24 July 1810	Portugal	None	United Kingdom Portugal	Victory
Siege of Almeida	25 July – 27 August 1810	Portugal	None	United Kingdom Portugal	Victory
Battle of Bussaco	27 September 1810	Portugal	None	United Kingdom Portugal	Defeat
Battle of Fuengirola	15 October 1810	Spain	Duchy of Warsaw	United Kingdom Spain	Victory
Battle of Baza	4 November 1810	Spain	None	Spain	Victory
Siege of Tortosa	16 December 1810 – 2 January 1811	Spain	None	Spain	Victory
Battle of the Gebora	19 February 1811	Spain	None	Spain Portugal	Victory
Battle of Barrosa	5 March 1811	Spain	None	United Kingdom, Spain Portugal	Indecisive
Battle of Lissa	13 March 1811	Adriatic Sea	Kingdom of Italy	United Kingdom	Defeat
Battle of Pombal	11 March 1811	Portugal	None	United Kingdom Portugal	Victory
Battle of Redinha	12 March 1811	Portugal	None	United Kingdom Portugal	Victory
Battle of Casal Novo	14 March 1811	Portugal	None	United Kingdom	Victory
Battle of Campo Maior	25 March 1811	Portugal	None	United Kingdom Portugal	Defeat
Battle of Sabugal	3 April 1811	Portugal	None	United Kingdom Portugal	Defeat
Siege of Figuières	10 April – 19 August 1811	Spain	Kingdom of Italy	Spain	Defeat
Blockade of Almeida	14 April – 10 May 1811	Portugal	None	United Kingdom Portugal	Victory
Battle of Fuentes de Onoro	3–5 May 1811	Spain	None	United Kingdom Portugal Kingdom of Spain	Defeat
Siege of Tarragona	5 May – 29 June 1811	Spain	None	Spain	Victory
Battle of Albuera	16 May 1811	Spain	None	United Kingdom Portugal Kingdom of Spain	Defeat
Battle of Usagre	25 May 1811	Spain	None	United Kingdom Portugal Kingdom of Spain	Defeat
Battle of Montserrat	25 July 1811	Spain	None	Spain	Victory
Battle of Zújar	11 August 1811	Spain	None	Spain	Victory
Battle of El Bodón	25 September 1811	Spain	None	United Kingdom	Victory
Battle of Saguntum	25 October 1811	Spain	None	Spain	Victory
Battle of Arroyo dos Molinos	28 October 1811	Spain	None	United Kingdom Portugal Kingdom of Spain	Defeat
Battle of Bornos	5 November 1811	Spain	None	Spain	Victory
Action of 29 November 1811	29 November 1811	Adriatic Sea	None	United Kingdom	Defeat
Siege of Valencia	26 December 1811 – 6 January 1812	Spain	None	Spain	Victory
Battle of Navas de Membrillo	29 December 1811	Spain	None	United Kingdom	Victory
Action of 22 February 1812	22 February 1812	Adriatic Sea	None	United Kingdom	Defeat
Siege of Ciudad Rodrigo	8–19 January 1812	Spain	None	United Kingdom Portugal	Defeat
Battle of Altafulla	29 January 1812	Spain	None	Spain	Victory
Siege of Badajoz	16 March – 6 April 1812	Spain	None	United Kingdom Portugal	Defeat
Battle of Villagarcia	11 April 1812	Spain	None	United Kingdom	Defeat
Battle of Almaraz	28–29 May 1812	Spain	None	United Kingdom Portugal	Defeat
Battle of Bornos	31 May 1812	Spain	None	Spain	Victory
Battle of Maguilla	11 June 1812	France	None	United Kingdom Portugal Spain	Victory
Battle of Castalla	21 July 1812	Spain	None	Spain	Victory
Battle of Salamanca	22 July 1812	Spain	None	United Kingdom Portugal Spain	Defeat
Battle of Garcia Hernandez	23 July 1812	Spain	None	United Kingdom	Defeat
Battle of Majadahonda	11 August 1812	Spain	None	United Kingdom Portugal	Victory
Siege of Burgos	18 September – 22 October 1812	Spain	None	United Kingdom Portugal	Victory
Battle of Venta del Pozo	23 October 1812	Spain	None	United Kingdom	Victory
Battle of Tordesillas	25 – 29 October 1812	Spain	None	United Kingdom Portugal Spain	Victory
Battle of San Muñoz	17 November 1812	Spain	None	United Kingdom	Victory
Battle of Vitoria	21 June 1813	Spain	None	United Kingdom Portugal Spain	Defeat
Siege of Tarragona	3 – 11 June 1813	Spain	None	United Kingdom Spain	Victory
First Siege of San Sebastiàn	7 July – 8 September 1813	Spain	None	United Kingdom Portugal	Victory
Battle of Sorauren	28 July – 1 August 1813	Spain	None	United Kingdom Portugal Spain	Defeat
Second Siege of San Sebastiàn	7 July – 8 September 1813	Spain	None	United Kingdom Portugal Spain	Defeat
Battle of the Pyrenees	25 July – 2 August 1813	Pyrenees	None	United Kingdom Portugal Spain	Defeat
Battle of Maya	25 July 1813	Spain	None	United Kingdom Spain	Victory
Battle of Roncesvalles	25 July 1813	Spain	None	United Kingdom Portugal	Victory
Battle of San Marcial	31 August 1813	Spain	None	Spain	Defeat
Battle of Ordal	13 September 1813	Spain	None	United Kingdom Spain	Victory
Battle of the Bidassoa	7 October 1813	France	None	United Kingdom Portugal Spain	Defeat
Battle of Nivelle	10 November 1813	France	None	United Kingdom Portugal Spain	Defeat
Battle of the Nive	9–12 December 1813	France	None	United Kingdom Portugal Spain	Defeat
Battle of Garris	15 February 1814	France	None	United Kingdom Portugal Spain	Defeat
Battle of Orthez	27 February 1814	France	None	United Kingdom Portugal Spain	Defeat
Battle of Toulouse	10 April 1814	France	None	United Kingdom Portugal Spain	Indecisive
Battle of Bayonne	14 April 1814	France	None	United Kingdom Portugal Spain	Defeat
War of the Fifth Coalition (1809)
Battle of Les Sables-d'Olonne	23 February 1809	France	None	United Kingdom	Defeat
Battle of the Basque Roads	11–25 April 1809	France	None	United Kingdom	Defeat
Battles of Bergisel	12 April - 1 November 1809	Austria	Kingdom of Bavaria	Tyroleans	Victory
Battle of Sacile	15 April 1809	Italy	Italy	Austrian Empire	Defeat
Battle of Teugen-Hausen	19 April 1809	Germany	None	Austrian Empire	Victory
Battle of Ratisbon	19–23 April 1809	Germany	Bavaria (Kingdom of Württemberg) Württemberg	Austrian Empire	Victory
Battle of Abensberg	20 April 1809	Germany	Bavaria (Kingdom of Württemberg) Württemberg	Austrian Empire	Victory
Battle of Landshut	21 April 1809	Germany	Bavaria (Kingdom of Württemberg) Württemberg	Austrian Empire	Victory
Battle of Eckmühl	22 April 1809	Germany	Bavaria (Kingdom of Württemberg) Württemberg	Austrian Empire	Victory
Battle of Neumarkt-Sankt Veit	24 April 1809	Germany	Bavaria	Austrian Empire	Victory
Dalmatian Campaign	26 April - 21 May 1809	Croatia	None	Austrian Empire	Victory
Battle of Caldiero	27–30 April 1809	Italy	Italy	Austrian Empire	Defeat
Battle of Ebersberg	3 May 1809	Austria	None	Austrian Empire	Victory
Battle of Piave River	7–8 May 1809	Italy	Italy	Austrian Empire	Victory
Battle of Wörgl	13 May 1809	Austria	Bavaria	Austrian Empire	Victory
Battle of Tarvis	15–18 May 1809	Italy	None	Austrian Empire	Victory
Battle of Linz-Urfahr	17 May 1809	Austria	(Kingdom of Württemberg) Württemberg Kingdom of Saxony	Austrian Empire	Victory
Battle of Aspern-Essling	21–22 May 1809	Austria	None	Austrian Empire	Defeat
Battle of Sankt Michael	25 May 1809	Austria	None	Austrian Empire	Victory
Battle of Stralsund	31 May 1809	Germany	(Denmark) Danish auxiliaries (Netherlands) Dutch auxiliaries	Prussian Freikorps	Victory
Battle of Raab	14 June 1809	Hungary	Italy	Austrian Empire	Victory
Battle of Graz	24–26 June 1809	Austria	Italy	Austrian Empire	Victory
Battle of Wagram	5–6 July 1809	Austria	Saxony Bavaria Italy	Austrian Empire	Victory
Combat of Korneuburg	7 July 1809	Austria	None	Austrian Empire	Victory
Combat of Stockerau	8 July 1809	Austria	None	Austrian Empire	Defeat
Battle of Gefrees	8 July 1809	Germany	None	Austrian Empire	Defeat
Battle of Hollabrunn	9 July 1809	Austria	None	Austrian Empire	Victory
Combat of Schöngrabern	10 July 1809	Austria	None	Austrian Empire	Victory
Battle of Znaim	10–11 July 1809	Czech Republic	None	Austrian Empire	Indecisive
Walcheren Campaign	30 July – 9 December 1809	Netherlands	(Netherlands) Kingdom of Holland	United Kingdom	Victory
Gottscheer rebellion	10 September - 18 October 1809	Slovenia	None	(Austrian Empire) Gottscheers	Victory
Mauritius campaign (1809–1811)
Action of 31 May 1809	31 May 1809	Bay of Bengal	None	United Kingdom	Victory
Raid on Saint-Paul	20 – 28 September 1809	Réunion	None	United Kingdom	Defeat
Action of 18 November 1809	18 November 1809	Bay of Bengal	None	United Kingdom	Victory
Action of 3 July 1810	3 July 1810	Comoro Islands	None	United Kingdom	Victory
Invasion of Île Bonaparte	7–9 July 1810	Réunion	None	United Kingdom	Defeat
Battle of Grand Port	20–27 August 1810	Mauritius	None	United Kingdom	Victory
Action of 13 September 1810	13 September 1810	Réunion	None	United Kingdom	Victory
Action of 18 September 1810	18 September 1810	Réunion	None	United Kingdom	Defeat
Invasion of Isle de France	29 November – 3 December 1810	Mauritius	None	United Kingdom	Defeat
Battle of Tamatave	20 May 1811	Madagascar	None	United Kingdom	Defeat
French invasion of Russia (1812)
Battle of Saltanovka	23 July 1812	Belarus	(Kingdom of the Two Sicilies) Naples Duchy of Warsaw Confederation of the Rhine	Russian Empire	Victory
Battle of Ostrovno	25–27 July 1812	Belarus	(Kingdom of the Two Sicilies) Naples Duchy of Warsaw Confederation of the Rhine	Russian Empire	Victory
Battle of Klyastitsy	30 July – 1 August 1812	Belarus	(Kingdom of the Two Sicilies) Naples Duchy of Warsaw Confederation of the Rhine	Russian Empire	Defeat
Battle of Smolensk	16–17 August 1812	Russia	(Kingdom of the Two Sicilies) Naples Duchy of Warsaw Confederation of the Rhine	Russian Empire	Victory
First Battle of Polotsk	17–18 August 1812	Belarus	(Kingdom of the Two Sicilies) Naples Duchy of Warsaw Confederation of the Rhine	Russian Empire	Victory
Battle of Valutino	18 August 1812	Russia	(Kingdom of the Two Sicilies) Naples Duchy of Warsaw Confederation of the Rhine	Russian Empire	Victory
Battle of Borodino	7 September 1812	Russia	(Kingdom of the Two Sicilies) Naples Duchy of Warsaw Confederation of the Rhine	Russian Empire	Victory
Occupation of Moscow	14 September 1812	Russia	(Kingdom of the Two Sicilies) Naples Duchy of Warsaw Confederation of the Rhine	Russian Empire	Victory
Battle of Tarutino	18 October 1812	Russia	(Kingdom of the Two Sicilies) Naples Duchy of Warsaw Confederation of the Rhine	Russian Empire	Defeat
Battle of Maloyaroslavets	24 October 1812	Russia	(Kingdom of the Two Sicilies) Naples Duchy of Warsaw Confederation of the Rhine	Russian Empire	Victory
Second Battle of Polotsk	18–20 October 1812	Belarus	(Kingdom of the Two Sicilies) Naples Duchy of Warsaw Confederation of the Rhine	Russian Empire	Defeat
Battle of Czasniki	31 October 1812	Belarus	(Kingdom of the Two Sicilies) Naples Duchy of Warsaw Confederation of the Rhine	Russian Empire	Defeat
Battle of Vyazma	3 November 1812	Russia	(Kingdom of the Two Sicilies) Naples Duchy of Warsaw Confederation of the Rhine	Russian Empire	Defeat
Battle of Smoliani	13–14 November 1812	Belarus	(Kingdom of the Two Sicilies) Naples Duchy of Warsaw Confederation of the Rhine	Russian Empire	Defeat
Battle of Krasnoi	15–18 November 1812	Russia	(Kingdom of the Two Sicilies) Naples Duchy of Warsaw Confederation of the Rhine	Russian Empire	Victory
Battle of Berezina	26–29 November 1812	Belarus	(Kingdom of the Two Sicilies) Naples Duchy of Warsaw Confederation of the Rhine	Russian Empire	Victory
War of the Sixth Coalition (1813–1814)
Action of 7 February 1813	7 February 1813	Sierra Leone	None	United Kingdom	Indecisive
Battle of Lützen	2 May 1813	Germany	None	Prussia Russia	Victory
Battle of Bautzen	20–21 May 1813	Germany	None	Prussia Russia	Victory
Battle of Luckau	6 June 1813	Germany	None	Prussia Russia	Defeat
Battle of Großbeeren	23 August 1813	Germany	None	Prussia Sweden	Defeat
Battle of Katzbach	26 August 1813	Germany	None	Prussia Russia	Defeat
Battle of Dresden	26–27 August 1813	Germany	None	Austria Prussia Russian Empire	Victory
First Battle of Kulm	30 August 1813	Czech Republic	None	Russian Empire Kingdom of Prussia Austria	Defeat
Battle of Dennewitz	6 September 1813	Germany	None	Kingdom of Prussia Russian Empire Sweden	Defeat
Battle of the Göhrde	16 September 1813	Germany	None	Kingdom of Prussia Russian Empire United Kingdom Hanover	Defeat
Second Battle of Kulm	17 September 1813	Czech Republic	None	Russian Empire Kingdom of Prussia Austria	Defeat
Battle of Leipzig	16–19 October 1813	Germany	(Kingdom of Italy (Napoleonic)) Italy (Kingdom of the Two Sicilies) Naples Duchy of Warsaw Saxony	(Austria) Austrian Empire Prussia Russia Sweden Saxony	Defeat
Battle of Hanau	30–31 October 1813	Germany	None	Bavaria Austria	Victory
Action of 5 November 1813	5 November 1813	Mediterranean	None	United Kingdom	Indecisive
Battle of Brienne	29 January 1814	France	None	Prussia Russia	Victory
Battle of La Rothière	1 February 1814	France	None	Prussia	Defeat
Battle of the Mincio River	8 February 1814	Italy	(Kingdom of Italy (Napoleonic)) Italy	Austria	Indecisive
Battle of Champaubert	10 February 1814	France	None	Prussia Russia	Victory
Battle of Montmirail	11 February 1814	France	None	Prussia Russia	Victory
Battle of Château-Thierry	12 February 1814	France	None	Prussia Russia	Victory
Battle of Vauchamps	14 February 1814	France	None	Prussia Russia	Victory
Battle of Mormant	17 February 1814	France	None	Russia Württemberg	Victory
Battle of Montereau	18 February 1814	France	None	Austrian Empire Kingdom of Württemberg	Victory
Battle of Bar-sur-Aube	27 February 1814	France	None	Austrian Empire	Defeat
Battle of Gué-à-Tresmes	28 February 1814	France	None	Prussia	Victory
Capture of Fort l'Écluse	1 March 1814	France	None	Austrian Empire	Victory
Battle of Craonne	7 March 1814	France	None	Prussia	Victory
Battle of Laon	9–10 March 1814	France	None	Kingdom of Prussia Russian Empire	Defeat
Battle of Reims	13 March 1814	France	None	Kingdom of Prussia Russian Empire	Victory
Battle of Arcis-sur-Aube	20–21 March 1814	France	None	Austrian Empire	Defeat
Battle of Fère-Champenoise	25 March 1814	France	None	Prussia Russia	Defeat
Battle of Saint-Dizier	26 March 1814	France	None	Russia	Victory
Battle of Montmartre	30 March 1814	France	None	Austria Kingdom of Prussia Russian Empire	Defeat
Battle of Paris	30–31 March 1814	France	None	Austria Kingdom of Prussia Russian Empire	Defeat
Waterloo Campaign (1815)
Battle of Ligny	16 June 1815	Belgium	None	Prussia	Victory
Battle of Quatre Bras	16 June 1815	Belgium	None	United Kingdom United Netherlands (Province of Hanover) Hanover Nassau Brunswick	Indecisive
Battle of Wavre	18–19 June 1815	Belgium	None	Prussia	Victory
Battle of Waterloo	18 June 1815	Belgium	None	United Kingdom United Netherlands (Province of Hanover) Hanover Nassau Brunswick Prussia	Defeat
Battle of La Suffel	28 June 1815	France	None	(Austria) Austrian Empire	Victory
Battle of Rocquencourt	1 July 1815	France	None	Prussia	Victory
Battle of Issy	3 July 1815	France	None	Prussia	Defeat
Invasion of Guadeloupe	3 July 1815	France	None	United Kingdom	Defeat

=== Bourbon Restoration (1814/1815–1830) ===
Battle	Date	Location	Allies	Enemies	Result
Spanish Civil War (1820–1823)
Battle of Trocadero	31 August 1823	Spain	None	(Spain) Partisans of the Cortes	Victory
Greek War of Independence (1821–1830)
Battle of Navarino	20 October 1827	Greece	United Kingdom of Great Britain and Ireland Russian Empire	Ottoman Empire Ottoman Vilayet of Egypt Ottoman Vilayet of Tunisia	Victory
Morea expedition	1828–1833	Greece	United Kingdom of Great Britain and Ireland Russian Empire	Ottoman Empire Ottoman Vilayet of Egypt Ottoman Vilayet of Tunisia	Victory
French colonisation of Africa (1825–1911)
Franco-Trarzan War	14 June – 7 July 1830	Senegal	None	Emirate of Trarza	Victory
French conquest of Algeria (1830–1847)
Invasion of Algiers	14 June – 7 July 1830	Algeria	None	(Ottoman Empire) Regency of Algiers	Victory

=== July Monarchy (1830–1848) ===
Battle	Date	Location	Allies	Enemies	Result
Belgian Revolution (1830)
Ten days campaign	2–12 August 1831	Belgium	Belgian rebels	Netherlands	Victory
Siege of Antwerp	15 November – 23 December 1832	Belgium	None	Netherlands	Victory
French conquest of Algeria (1830–1847)
Battle of Maison Carrée	23 April 1832	Algeria	None	Berbers Arabs	Victory
Battle of Macta	28 June 1835	Algeria	None	Emirate of Mascara	Defeat
Battle of Sikkak	6 July 1836	Algeria	None	Emirate of Mascara	Victory
Battle of Constantine	21–27 November 1836	Algeria	None	Beylik of Constantine	Defeat
Siege of Constantine	10–13 October 1837	Algeria	None	Beylik of Constantine	Victory
Battle of Mazagran	February 1840	Algeria	None	Emirate of Mascara	Victory
Battle of the Mouzaïa Pass	12 May 1840	Algeria	None	Berbers Arabs	Victory
Battle of the Smala	16 May 1843	Algeria	None	Emirate of Mascara	Victory
Battle of Sidi-Brahim	22–25 September 1845	Algeria	None	Emirate of Mascara	Defeat
First Carlist War (1833–1839)
Battle of Terapegui	26 April 1836	Spain	Isabelinos	Carlists	Victory
Battle of Huesca	24 March 1837	Spain	Isabelinos	Carlists	Victory
First Franco-Moroccan War (1844)
Bombardment of Tangiers	6 August 1844	Morocco	None	Morocco	Victory
Bombardment of Mogador	15–17 August 1844	Morocco	None	Morocco	Victory
Battle of Isly	16 August 1844	Morocco	None	Morocco	Victory
Pastry War (1838–1839)
Bombardment of San Juan de Ulúa	27 November – 5 December 1838	Mexico	None	Mexico	Victory
Uruguayan Civil War (1839–1851)
Battle of Vuelta de Obligado	20 November 1845	Rio de la Plata	United Kingdom	Argentine Confederation	Victory
Far East Campaigns (1842–1896)
Blockade of Basilan	1844–1845	Philippines	None	Sultanate of Sulu	Victory
Bombardment of Tourane	15 April 1847	Vietnam	None	Vietnam	Victory
French-Tahitian War (1844–1847)
Battle of Mahaena	17 April 1844	Tahiti	None	Tahiti	Victory
Blockade of Raiatea	1845–1846	Raiatea	None	Raiatea	Defeat
Battle of Maeva	17 January 1846	Huahine	None	Huahine	Defeat
Battle of Punaruu	May 1846	Tahiti	None	Tahiti	Victory
Battle of Fautaua	17 December 1846	Tahiti	None	Tahiti	Victory

=== Second Republic (1848–1852) ===
Battle	Date	Location	Allies	Enemies	Result
Roman revolution (1849)
Siege of Rome	1–3 July 1849	Italy	None	Roman republicans	Victory
Pacification of Algeria (1849)
Battle of Zaatcha	16 July – 26 November 1849	Algeria	None	Berbers Arabs	Victory
French colonisation of Africa (1825–1911)
Bombardment of Salé	26–27 November 1851	Morocco	None	Morocco	Indecisive

=== Second Empire (1852–1870) ===
Battle	Date	Location	Allies	Enemies	Result
Pacification of Algeria (1849)
Siege of Laghouat	21 November–4 December 1852	Algeria	None	Berbers Arabs	Victory
Crimean War (1853–1856)
Bombardment of Odessa	22 April 1854	Russia	United Kingdom	Russian Empire	Victory
Siege of Petropavlovsk	18–27 August 1854	Russia	United Kingdom	Russian Empire	Defeat
Battle of Bomarsund	August 1854	Åland	United Kingdom	Russian Empire	Victory
Battle of Alma	20 September 1854	Russia	United Kingdom Ottoman Empire	Russian Empire	Victory
Siege of Sevastopol	17 October 1854 – 11 September 1855	Russia	United Kingdom Ottoman Empire	Russian Empire	Victory
Battle of Balaclava	25 October 1854	Russia	United Kingdom Ottoman Empire	Russian Empire	Victory
Charge of the Light Brigade	25 October 1854	Russia	United Kingdom	Russian Empire	Defeat
Battle of Inkerman	5 November 1854	Russia	United Kingdom	Russian Empire	Victory
Battle of Eupatoria	17 February 1855	Russia	United Kingdom Ottoman Empire	Russian Empire	Victory
Siege of Taganrog	12 May – 31 August 1855	Russia	United Kingdom	Russian Empire	Defeat
Battle of the Chernaya	16 August 1855	Russia	Kingdom of Sardinia Ottoman Empire	Russian Empire	Victory
Battle of Malakoff	7 September 1855	Russia	None	Russian Empire (Bulgaria) Bulgarian Legion	Victory
Battle of Kinburn	17 October 1855	Black Sea	United Kingdom	Russian Empire	Victory
Second Franco-Trarza War (1855-1858)
Battle of Dioubouldou	25 February 1855	Senegal	None	Emirate of Trarza Kingdom of Waalo	Victory
Battle of Leybar Bridge	21 April 1855	Senegal	None	Emirate of Trarza	Victory
Battle of Dagana	13 May 1857	Senegal	None	Emirate of Trarza	Victory
Franco-Toucouleur War (1855-1860)
Siege of Medina Fort	20 April – 18 July 1857	Mali	None	Toucouleur Jihad	Victory
Battle of Guémou	25 October 1859	Mauritania	None	Toucouleur Jihad	Victory
Second Opium War (1856–1860)
First Battle of Taku Forts	20 May 1858	China	United Kingdom	China	Victory
Second Battle of Taku Forts	24–26 June 1859	China	United Kingdom United States	China	Defeat
Third Battle of Taku Forts	12–21 August 1860	China	United Kingdom	China	Victory
Battle of Zhangjiawan	18 September 1860	China	United Kingdom	China	Victory
Battle of Palikao	21 September 1860	China	United Kingdom	China	Victory
Cochinchina campaign (1858–1862)
Siege of Tourane	1 September 1858 – 22 March 1860	Vietnam	Spain	Vietnam	Defeat
Siege of Saigon	1858–1859	Vietnam	Spain	Vietnam	Victory
Battle of Ky Hoa	February 1861	Vietnam	Spain	Vietnam	Victory
Capture of Mỹ Tho	12 April 1861	Vietnam	Spain	Vietnam	Victory
Capture of Biên Hòa	16 December 1861	Vietnam	Spain	Vietnam	Victory
Capture of Vĩnh Long	22 March 1862	Vietnam	Spain	Vietnam	Victory
Franco-Austrian War (1859)
Battle of Montebello	20 May 1859	Italy	Sardinia	Austrian Empire	Victory
Battle of Palestro	31 May 1859	Italy	Sardinia	Austrian Empire	Victory
Battle of Turbigo	3 June 1859	Italy	None	Austrian Empire	Victory
Battle of Magenta	4 June 1859	Italy	Sardinia	Austrian Empire	Victory
Battle of Solferino	24 June 1859	Italy	Sardinia	Austrian Empire	Victory
Taiping Rebellion (1861–1862)
Battle of Shanghai	July 1861 – November 1862	China	Qing dynasty United Kingdom	Taiping Heavenly Kingdom	Victory
French intervention in Mexico (1861–1867)
Battle of Fortín	19 April 1862	Mexico	None	(Mexico) Mexican Republicans	Victory
Battle of Las Cumbres	28 April 1862	Mexico	None	(Mexico) Mexican Republicans	Victory
Battle of Atlixco	4 May 1862	Mexico	None	(Mexico) Mexican Republicans	Defeat
Battle of Puebla	5 May 1862	Mexico	None	(Mexico) Mexican Republicans	Defeat
Battle of Barranca Seca	17 May 1862	Mexico	None	(Mexico) Mexican Republicans	Victory
Battle of Cerro del Borrego	13 June 1862	Mexico	None	(Mexico) Mexican Republicans	Victory
Battle of Orizaba	14 June 1862	Mexico	None	(Mexico) Mexican Republicans	Victory
Battle of La Hoya and Cruz Blanca	December 1862	Mexico	None	(Mexico) Mexican Republicans	Indecisive
Siege of Puebla	16 March – 17 May 1863	Mexico	(Mexico) Second Mexican Empire	(Mexico) Mexican Republicans	Victory
Battle of San Pablo del Monte	5 May 1863	Mexico	None	(Mexico) Mexican Republicans	Victory
First battle of Acapulco	10–12 January 1863	Mexico	None	(Mexico) Mexican Republicans	Victory
Battle of Nopalucan	February 1863	Mexico	None	(Mexico) Mexican Republicans	Victory
Capture of Jonuta	21 February 1863	Mexico	None	(Mexico) Mexican Republicans	Victory
Battle of Camarón	30 April 1863	Mexico	None	(Mexico) Mexican Republicans	Victory
Battle of San Pablo del Monte	5 May 1863	Mexico	None	(Mexico) Mexican Republicans	Victory
Capture of Mazatlán	28–31 May 1863	Mexico	None	(Mexico) Mexican Republicans	Defeat
Second battle of Acapulco	3 June 1864	Mexico	None	(Mexico) Mexican Republicans	Victory
Battle of San Pedro	22 December 1864	Mexico	(Mexico) Second Mexican Empire	(Mexico) Mexican Republicans	Defeat
Siege of Mexico City	12 April – 21 June 1867	Mexico	(Mexico) Second Mexican Empire (Austria-Hungary) Austro-Hungarian troops	(Mexico) Mexican Republicans United States	Defeat
Far East Campaigns (1842–1896)
Battles for Shimonoseki	20 July – 14 August 1863, 5–6 September 1864	Japan	United Kingdom Netherlands United States	Chōshū	Victory
Battle of Ganghwa	October–November 1866	Korea	None	Korea	Defeat
Garibaldi's Expedition against Rome (1867)
Battle of Mentana	3 November 1867	Italy	Papal States	Italian volunteers	Victory
Franco-Prussian War (1870–1871)
Occupation of Saarbrücken	2 August 1870	Germany	None	Prussia	Victory
Battle of Wissembourg	4 August 1870	France	None	Prussia Baden Bavaria (Kingdom of Württemberg) Württemberg	Defeat
Battle of Spicheren	6 August 1870	France	None	Prussia	Defeat
Battle of Wörth	6 August 1870	France	None	Prussia Baden Bavaria (Kingdom of Württemberg) Württemberg	Defeat
Battle of Borny-Colombey	14 August 1870	France	None	Prussia	Indecisive
Siege of Toul	16 August – 23 September 1870	France	None	Prussia Bavaria (Kingdom of Württemberg) Württemberg	Defeat
Battle of Mars-la-Tour	16 August 1870	France	None	Prussia	Defeat
Battle of Gravelotte	18 August 1870	France	None	Prussia	Victory
Siege of Metz	20 August – 27 October 1870	France	None	Prussia	Defeat
Siege of Strasbourg	23 August – 28 September 1870	France	None	Baden (Kingdom of Württemberg) Württemberg	Defeat
Battle of Beaumont	30 August 1870	France	None	Prussia	Defeat
Battle of Noiseville	31 August – 1 September 1870	France	None	Prussia	Defeat
Battle of Bazeilles	1 September 1870	France	None	Bavaria	Defeat
Battle of Sedan	1 September 1870	France	None	Prussia Bavaria	Defeat

=== Third Republic (1870–1940) ===
Battle	Date	Location	Allies	Enemies	Issue
Franco-Prussian War (1870–1871)
Battle of Bellevue	18 October 1870	France	None	Prussia	Defeat
Battle of Châteaudun	18 October 1870	France	None	Prussia	Defeat
The Battles of Dijon	29 October 1870 – 23 January 1871	France	Giuseppe Garibaldi	Prussia	Victory
Siege of Belfort	3 November 1870 – 18 February 1871	France	None	Baden Württemberg	Indecisive
Battle of Havana	9 November 1870	Straits of Florida	None	Prussia	Indecisive
Battle of Coulmiers	9 November 1870	France	None	Bavaria	Victory
Battle of Amiens	27 November 1870	France	None	Prussia	Defeat
Battle of Beaune-la-Rolande	28 November 1870	France	None	Prussia	Defeat
Battle of Villepion	1 December 1870	France	None	Bavaria	Victory
Battle of Loigny-Poupry	2 December 1870	France	None	Prussia	Defeat
Second Battle of Orléans	2–4 December 1870	France	None	Prussia	Defeat
Battle of Beaugency	8–10 December 1870	France	None	Prussia	Defeat
Battle of Hallue	23–24 December 1870	France	None	Prussia	Indecisive
Battle of Bapaume	3 January 1871	France	None	Prussia	Defeat
Battle of Villersexel	9 January 1871	France	None	Prussia	Victory
Battle of Le Mans	11–12 January 1871	France	None	Prussia	Defeat
Battle of the Lisaine	15–28 January 1871	France	None	Prussia	Defeat
Battle of St. Quentin	19 January 1871	France	None	Germany	Defeat
Battle of Buzenval	19 January 1871	France	None	Germany	Defeat
Siege of Paris	September 1870 – 28 January 1871	France	None	Germany	Defeat
Pacification of Algeria (1871–1902)
Mokrani Revolt	16 March 1871	Algeria	None	Arabs Berbers	Victory
Massacre of the Flatters' Mission	16 February 1881	Algeria	None	Arabs Berbers	Defeat
Battle of Tit	7 May 1902	Algeria	None	Tuaregs	Victory
Battle of Taghit	17 August 1903	Algeria	None	Berbers	Victory
Battle of El-Moungar	2 September 1903	Algeria	None	Berbers	Victory
Garnier Expedition (1873–1874)
Battle of Hanoi	20 November 1873	Vietnam	None	Vietnam	Victory
Battle of Phủ Lý	26 November 1873	Vietnam	None	Vietnam	Victory
Battle of Hải Dương	4 December 1873	Vietnam	None	Vietnam	Victory
Capture of Ninh Bình	5 December 1873	Vietnam	None	Vietnam	Victory
Battle of Nam Định	11 December 1873	Vietnam	None	Vietnam	Victory
Battle of Hanoi	21 December 1873	Vietnam	None	Vietnam Black Flag Army	Indecisive
Leewards War (1880–1897)
Capture of Teraupo'o	16 February 1897	Raiatea	None	Raiatea	Victory
Tonkin Campaign (1883–1896)
Capture of Nam Định	27 March 1883	Vietnam	None	Vietnam Black Flag Army	Victory
Battle of Gia Cuc	27–28 March 1883	Vietnam	None	Vietnam Black Flag Army	Victory
Battle of Paper Bridge	19 May 1883	Vietnam	None	Black Flag Army	Defeat
Battle of Phủ Hoài	15 August 1883	Vietnam	None	Black Flag Army	Victory
Battle of Thuận An	20 August 1883	Vietnam	None	Vietnam	Victory
Battle of Palan	1 September 1883	Vietnam	None	Black Flag Army Vietnam	Victory
Sơn Tây Campaign	December 1883	Vietnam	None	Black Flag Army Vietnam (Qing dynasty) China	Victory
Bắc Ninh Campaign	6–24 March 1884	Vietnam	None	Black Flag Army Vietnam (Qing dynasty) China	Victory
Capture of Hưng Hóa	12 April 1884	Vietnam	None	Black Flag Army Vietnam (Qing dynasty) China	Victory
Pacification of Tonkin	1886–96	Vietnam	None	Tonkinese	Victory
Sino–French War (1884–1886)
Bắc Lệ ambush	23–24 June 1884	Vietnam	None	China	Defeat
Battle of Fuzhou	23–26 August 1884	China	None	China	Victory
Keelung Campaign	August 1884 – March 1885	Taiwan	None	China	Indecisive
Battle of Tamsui	8 October 1884	Taiwan	None	China	Defeat
Kep Campaign	8 October 1884	Vietnam	None	China	Victory
Battle of Yu Oc	19 November 1884	Vietnam	None	Black Flag Army	Victory
Siege of Tuyên Quang	23 November 1884 – 28 February 1885	Vietnam	None	China Black Flag Army	Victory
Lạng Sơn Campaign	3–13 February 1885	Vietnam	None	China	Victory
Battle of Núi Bop	3–4 January 1885	Vietnam	None	China	Victory
Battle of Shipu	14–15 February 1885	China	None	China	Victory
Battle of Đồng Đăng	23 February 1885	Vietnam	None	China	Victory
Battle of Zhenhai	1 March 1885	China	None	China	Indecisive
Battle of Hòa Mộc	2 March 1885	Vietnam	None	China Black Flag Army	Victory
Battle of Phu Lam Tao	23 March 1885	Vietnam	None	China Black Flag Army	Defeat
Battle of Bang Bo	24 March 1885	Vietnam	None	China Black Flag Army Vietnam	Defeat
Battle of Ky Lua	28 March 1885	Vietnam	None	China	Victory
Pescadores Campaign	March 1885	Penghu Islands	None	China	Victory
Franco-Siamese conflict (1893)
Paknam incident	13 July 1893	Laos	None	(Thailand) Siam	Victory
Scramble for Africa (1881–1914)
Conquest of Tunisia	1881	Tunisia	None	Beylik of Tunis	Victory
Bombardment of Alexandria	11–13 July 1882	Egypt	United Kingdom	Beylik of Tunis	Victory
Mandingo Wars	1883–1898	Ivory Coast	None	Wassoulou Empire	Victory
Battle of Cotonou	4 March 1890	Benin	None	Dahomey	Victory
Battle of Atchoukpa	29 March 1890	Benin	None	Dahomey	Victory
Battle of Dogba	19 September 1892	Benin	None	Dahomey	Victory
Battle of Poguessa	4 October 1892	Benin	None	Dahomey	Victory
Battle of Adégon	6 October 1892	Benin	None	Dahomey	Victory
Siege of Akpa	15–26 October 1892	Benin	None	Dahomey	Victory
Battle of Kana	2 November 1892	Benin	None	Dahomey	Victory
First Madagascar expedition	1893	Madagascar	None	Merina Kingdom	Victory
Second Madagascar expedition	December 1894 – September 1895	Madagascar	None	Merina Kingdom	Victory
Gentil Missions	1895–1899	West Africa	None	African tribes	Victory
Voulet–Chanoine Mission	1898	West Africa	None	African tribes	Victory
Foureau-Lamy Mission	1898	West Africa	None	African tribes	Victory
Battle of Togbao	17 July 1899	Chad	Kingdom of Baguirmi	Rabih's empire	Defeat
Battle of Kouno	28 October 1899	Chad	None	Rabih's empire	Indecisive
Battle of Kousséri	22 April 1900	Chad	Kingdom of Baguirmi	Rabih's empire	Victory
Wadai War	1909–1911	Chad	None	Ouaddai Empire	Victory
Second Franco-Moroccan War	1911	Morocco	None	Morocco	Victory
Battle of Sidi Bou Othman	6 September 1912	Morocco	None	Moroccan resistance	Victory
Boxer Rebellion (1900–1901)
Siege of the International Legation	1900–1901	China	Eight-Nation Alliance	China Righteous Harmony Society	Victory
Seymour Expedition	10–28 June 1900	China	Eight-Nation Alliance	China Righteous Harmony Society	Defeat
Battle of Tientsin	13–14 July 1900	China	Eight-Nation Alliance	China Righteous Harmony Society	Victory
Battle of Yangcun	4 August 1900	China	Eight-Nation Alliance	China Righteous Harmony Society	Victory
Battle of Beicang	5 August 1900	China	Eight-Nation Alliance	China Righteous Harmony Society	Victory
Gasalee Expedition	August 1900	China	Eight-Nation Alliance	China Righteous Harmony Society	Victory
Battle of Peking	20 June – 15 August 1900	China	Eight-Nation Alliance	China Righteous Harmony Society	Victory
First World War (1914–1918)
Kamerun campaign	6 August 1914 – 10 March 1916	Cameroon	United Kingdom	German Empire	Victory
Battle of Mulhouse	7–26 August 1914	France	None	German Empire	Defeat
Battle of the Frontiers	10–28 August 1914	Belgium-France	United Kingdom Belgium	German Empire	Defeat
Battle of Bafilo	13 August 1914	Togo	None	German Empire	Defeat
Battle of Dinant	15–23 August 1914	Belgium	None	German Empire	Victory
Battle of Charleroi	21 August 1914	Belgium	None	German Empire	Defeat
Battle of the Ardennes	21–23 August 1914	Belgium	None	German Empire	Defeat
Battle of Chra	22 August 1914	Togo	United Kingdom	German Empire	Victory
Siege of Maubeuge	24 August – 7 September 1914	France	None	German Empire	Defeat
Battle of Le Cateau	26 August 1914	France	United Kingdom Belgium	German Empire	Victory
Battle of St. Quentin	29 August 1914	France	None	German Empire	Victory
Occupation of German Samoa	29–30 August 1914	Samoa	United Kingdom Australia New Zealand	German Empire	Victory
Battle of Grand Couronné	4–13 September 1914	France	None	German Empire	Victory
First Battle of the Marne	5–12 September 1914	France	United Kingdom	German Empire	Victory
First Battle of the Aisne	13 September 1914 – 28 September 1914	France	United Kingdom	German Empire	Indecisive
Battle of Flirey	19 September – 11 October 1914	France	United Kingdom	German Empire	Defeat
Bombardment of Papeete	22 September 1914	French Polynesia	United Kingdom	German Empire	Defeat
First Battle of Albert	25–29 September 1914	France	United Kingdom	German Empire	Indecisive
First Battle of Arras	1–4 October 1914	France	United Kingdom	German Empire	Victory
Battle of the Yser	16–31 October 1914	France	Belgium	German Empire	Victory
Battle of Penang	28 October 1914	Malaya	Russian Empire	German Empire	Defeat
First Battle of Ypres	29 October – 24 November 1914	Belgium	United Kingdom Belgium	German Empire	Victory
Battle of El Herri	13 November 1914	Morocco	None	Zaian rebellion	Defeat
First Battle of Champagne	20 December 1914 – 17 March 1915	France	None	German Empire	Indecisive
Gallipoli Campaign	19 February 1915 – 9 January 1916	Turkey	Australia (British Raj) British India (Dominion of Newfoundland) Newfoundland New Zealand United Kingdom	Ottoman Empire Germany Austria-Hungary	Defeat
Second Battle of Ypres	22 April – 25 May 1915	Belgium	United Kingdom Canada British India Belgium	German Empire	Victory
First Battle of Krithia	28 April 1915	Turkey	United Kingdom	Ottoman Empire	Victory
Second Battle of Krithia	6–8 May 1915	Turkey	United Kingdom Australia New Zealand	Ottoman Empire	Defeat
Second Battle of Artois	9–15 May 1915	France	United Kingdom British India	German Empire	Indecisive
Third Battle of Krithia	5 June 1915	Turkey	United Kingdom	Ottoman Empire	Defeat
Third Battle of Artois	15 September 1915 – 4 November 1915	France	United Kingdom	German Empire	Indecisive
Second Battle of Champagne	25 September – 6 November 1915	France	None	German Empire	Indecisive
Battle of Krivolak	17 October – 21 November 1915	Macedonia	None	Bulgaria	Defeat
Battle of Verdun	21 February – 19 December 1916	France	None	German Empire	Victory
Second Battle of Albert	1–13 July 1916	France	United Kingdom Newfoundland	German Empire	Indecisive
Battle of the Somme	1 July – 18 November 1916	France	United Kingdom Canada Australia New Zealand South Africa India Newfoundland	German Empire	Indecisive
Battle of Doiran	9–18 August 1916	Macedonia	United Kingdom	Bulgaria	Defeat
Monastir Offensive	12 September 1916 – 11 December 1916	Macedonia	Serbia Italy Russian Empire United Kingdom	Bulgaria German Empire Ottoman Empire	Victory
Battle of Malka Nidzhe	12–14 September 1916	Macedonia	Russian Empire Serbia	Bulgaria	Victory
Battle of the River Cherna	October – November 1916	Macedonia	Serbia	Bulgaria	Victory
Battle of Funchal	2–3 December 1916	Portugal	United Kingdom Portugal	German Empire	Defeat
Kaocen Revolt	17 December 1916 – 3 March 1917	Niger	None	Tuareg rebellion	Victory
Second Battle of Gaza	16 April – October 1917	Palestine	None	Ottoman Empire; German Empire	Defeat
Second Battle of the Aisne	16 April – October 1917	France	None	German Empire	Defeat
Battle of the Hills	17–20 April 1917	France	None	German Empire	Victory
Battle of the Cerna Bend	5–9 May 1917	Macedonia	Italy Russian Empire	Bulgaria German Empire	Defeat
Battle of Monastir	18 May 1917	Macedonia	None	Bulgaria	Defeat
Battle of Passchendaele	31 July – 6 November 1917	Belgium	United Kingdom Australia Canada India New Zealand South Africa	German Empire	Indecisive
Second battle of Verdun	20–24 August 1917	France	None	German Empire	Victory
Battle of Malmaison	24 October 1917	France	None	German Empire	Victory
Operation Michael	31 July – 6 November 1917	Belgium	United Kingdom Australia New Zealand United States	German Empire	Indecisive
Spring Offensive	21 May – 18 July 1918	Belgium-France	United Kingdom Australia Canada New Zealand Newfoundland United States Portugal	German Empire	Defeat
Third Battle of the Aisne	27 May – 6 June 1918	France	United Kingdom United States Italy	German Empire	Victory
Second Battle of the Marne	27 May – 6 August 1918	France	United Kingdom United States Italy	German Empire	Victory
Battle of Cantigny	28 May 1918	France	United States	German Empire	Victory
Battle of Skra-di-Legen	29–31 May 1918	Greece	Greece	Bulgaria	Victory
Battle of Belleau Wood	1–6 June 1918	France	United States United Kingdom	German Empire	Victory
Second Battle of the Marne	15 July – 6 August 1918	France	United Kingdom United States Italy	German Empire	Victory
Battle of Château-Thierry	18 July 1918	France	United States Belgium	German Empire	Victory
Battle of Amiens	8–12 August 1918	France	United Kingdom Australia Canada United States	German Empire	Victory
Hundred Days Offensive	8 August – 11 November 1918	Belgium-France	(British Empire) United Kingdom Australia Canada India New Zealand South Africa United States Belgium Portugal	German Empire	Victory
Vardar Offensive	14–29 September 1918	Macedonia	Serbia United Kingdom Greece Italy	Bulgaria German Empire	Victory
Battle of Dobro Pole	15 September 1918	Macedonia	Greece Serbia	Bulgaria German Empire	Victory
Battle of Épehy	8 September 1918	France	(British Empire) United Kingdom Australia	German Empire	Victory
Battle of Arara	19 September 1918	Palestine	French Armenian Legion	Ottoman Empire	Victory
Battle of Megiddo	19 September – 31 October 1918	Israel	United Kingdom British India Australia New Zealand (Arab Revolt) Kingdom of Hejaz	Ottoman Empire Germany	Victory
Meuse-Argonne Offensive	26 September – 11 November 1918	France	United States	German Empire	Victory
Battle of Courtrai	14–19 October 1918	Belgium	Belgium United Kingdom United States	German Empire	Victory
Battle of the Sambre	4 November 1918	France	United Kingdom	German Empire	Victory
Allied intervention in the Russian Civil War (1918–1920)
North Russia Campaign	June 1918 – March 1920	Russia	United Kingdom United States Canada (Russia) White Movement	Russian SFSR	Defeat
Siberian Intervention	August 1918 – July 1920	Russia	Japan United States United Kingdom Canada Italy (Russia) White Movement	Russian SFSR Pro-Bolshevik forces Far Eastern Republic	Defeat
Franco-Turkish War (1918–1921)
Occupation of Constantinople	13 November 1918 – 10 February 1923	Turkey	United Kingdom (India) British Raj (Kingdom of Italy) Italy	Ottoman Empire	Victory
Battle of Marash	21 January – 13 February 1920	Turkey	French Armenian Legion	Turkish revolutionaries	Defeat
Battle of Urfa	9 February – 11 April 1920	Turkey	French Armenian Legion	Turkish revolutionaries	Defeat
Siege of Aintab	1 April 1920 – 8 February 1921	Turkey	French Armenian Legion	Turkish revolutionaries	Victory
Battle of Karboğazı	27–28 May 1920	Turkey	None	Turkish revolutionaries	Defeat
Franco-Syrian War (1919–1921)
1919 Syrian Revolt	1919	Syria	None	Syrian insurgents	Victory
Siege of Damascus	1919–1920	Syria	None	Syria	Victory
Battle of Maysalun	23 July 1920	Syria	None	Syria	Victory
Rif War (1920)
French Intervention in Morocco	8 September 1920	Morocco	Spain	Republic of the Rif	Victory
Great Syrian Revolt (1925–1927)
Battle of Salkhad	19–20 July 1925	Syria	None	Druzes	Defeat
Battle of al-Mazraa	2–3 August 1925	Syria	None	Druzes and Bedouins	Defeat
Battle of al-Musayfirah	17 September 1925	Syria	None	Druzes	Victory
1925 Hama uprising	4–5 October 1925	Syria	None	Syria rebels	Victory
Kongo-Wara rebellion (1928–1931)
Kongo-Wara rebellion	1928–1931	Cameroon	Gbaya people	Fula people	Victory

=== World War II (1939–1945) ===
Battle	Date	Location	Allies	Enemies	Issue
World War II (1939–1945)
Saar Offensive	7–16 September 1939	Germany	None	Germany	Indecisive
Norwegian Campaign	9 April – 10 June 1940	Norway	Norway United Kingdom (Poland) Polish Forces in the West	Germany	Defeat
Namsos Campaign	April and early May 1940	Norway	Norway United Kingdom	Germany	Defeat
Battle of Narvik	9 April – 8 June 1940	Norway	Norway United Kingdom (Poland) Polish Forces in the West	Germany	Defeat
Invasion of Luxembourg	10 May 1940	Luxembourg	Luxembourg	Germany	Defeat
Battle of the Netherlands	10–14 May 1940	Netherlands	Netherlands	Germany	Defeat
Battle of Zeeland	10–18 May 1940	Netherlands	Netherlands United Kingdom	Germany	Defeat
Battle of Belgium	10–18 May 1940	Belgium	Belgium Netherlands United Kingdom	Germany	Defeat
Battle of Hannut	12–14 May 1940	Belgium	Netherlands United Kingdom	Germany	Victory
Battle of Gembloux	12–14 May 1940	Belgium	None	Germany	Victory
Battle of France	10 May – 22 June 1940	France	Belgium Netherlands United Kingdom Canada Czechoslovakia Poland Luxembourg	Germany	Defeat
Battle of Sedan	12–15 May 1940	France	United Kingdom	Germany	Defeat
Battle of La Horgne	14–15 May 1940	France	None	Germany	Defeat
Battle of Montcornet	17 May 1940	France	None	Germany	Defeat
Battle of Arras	21 May 1940	France	United Kingdom	Germany	Defeat
Siege of Calais	22–26 May 1940	France	United Kingdom	Germany	Defeat
Battle of the Lys	22–28 May 1940	Belgium/France	Belgium	Germany	Defeat
Siege of Lille	25–30 May 1940	France	None	Germany	Defeat
Battle of Abbeville	28 May – 4 June 1940	France	United Kingdom	Germany	Victory
Battle of Dunkirk	25 May – 3 June 1940	France	Belgium United Kingdom	Germany	Defeat
Operation Paula	3 June 1940	France	None	Germany	Victory
Battle of Pont-de-l'Arche	9 June 1940	France	None	Germany	Defeat
Italian invasion of France	10–25 June 1940	France	None	(Kingdom of Italy) Italy	Victory
Battle of Saumur	18–20 June 1940	France	None	Germany	Defeat
Attack on Mers-el-Kébir	3 July 1940	Algeria	None	United Kingdom	Defeat
Invasion of French Indochina	22–26 September 1940	South-East Asia	None	Japan	Defeat
Franco-Thai War	October 1940 – 9 May 1941	South-East Asia	None	Thailand	Indecisive
Operation Compass	9 December 1940 – 9 February 1941	Egypt/Libya	United Kingdom Australia (British Raj) India Poland	Italy	Victory
Battle of Ko Chang	16–17 January 1941	Gulf of Thailand	None	Thailand	Victory
Battle of Kufra	31 January – 1 March 1941	Libya	None	Italy	Victory
Battle of Keren	2 February – 1 April 1941	Eritrea	United Kingdom	Italy	Victory
Siege of Tobruk	10 April – 27 November 1941	Libya	United Kingdom	Germany	Victory
Battle of Bir Hakeim	26 May – 11 June 1942	Libya	French Free Forces	Germany Italy	Victory
Dieppe Raid	19 August 1942	France	United Kingdom Poland	Germany	Defeat
Second Battle of El Alamein	23 October – 3 November 1942	Egypt	United Kingdom Australia India New Zealand South Africa Greece	Germany	rowspan="23" style="background:#AFA" |Victory
Battle of Ksar Ghilane	10 March 1943	Tunisia	New Zealand Greece	Germany	
Operation Pugilist	16–27 March 1943	Tunisia	United Kingdom New Zealand (British Raj) British India	Germany Italy	
Allied invasion of Sicily	9 July – 17 August 1943	Italy	United Kingdom United States Canada	Germany Italy	
Bernhardt Line	1 December 1943 – 15 January 1943	Italy	United Kingdom United States New Zealand Canada (British Raj) India	Germany	
Battle of Monte Cassino	4 January – 19 May 1944	Italy	United Kingdom United States Poland Canada (British Raj) British India New Zealand	Germany	
Battle of Ist	29 February 1944	Adriatic Sea	None	Germany	
Operation Dingson	5–18 June 1944	France	None	Germany	
Invasion of Normandy	6 June – 25 August 1944	France	United Kingdom United States Canada (Poland) Free Polish Forces Australia (Belgium) Free Belgian Forces New Zealand Netherlands Norway (Czechoslovakia) Free Czechoslovak Forces Greece	Germany	
Normandy landings	6 June 1944	France	United States United Kingdom Canada Poland Norway Australia New Zealand Greece	Germany	
Sword Beach	6 June 1944	France	United Kingdom	Germany	
Invasion of Elba	17 June 1944	Italy	United Kingdom United States	Germany	
Operation Dragoon	15 August 1944	France	United States United Kingdom Canada Greece	Germany	
Liberation of Paris	19–25 August 1944	France	France	Germany	
Saint-Nazaire Pocket	27 August 1944 – 11 May 1945	France	France	Germany	
Allied advance from Paris to the Rhine	25 August 1944 – March 1945	France	France United Kingdom Canada and others	Germany	
Liberation of Nice	28 August 1944	France	French Free Forces	Germany	
Siege of La Rochelle	28 August 1944	France	United States United Kingdom	Germany	
Siege of Dunkirk	15 September 1944 – 8 May 1945	France	Canada; United Kingdom; Czechoslovakia; France (Belgium) Belgian Resistance	Germany	
Battle of the Bulge	16 December 1944 – 25 January 1945	Belgium	United States United Kingdom Canada (Belgium) Belgian resistance	Germany	
Operation Nordwind	1–25 January 1945	France	United States	Germany	
Colmar Pocket	20 January – 9 February 1945	France	United States	Germany	
Western Allied invasion of Germany	8 February – 8 May 1945	Germany	United States United Kingdom Canada	Germany	
Japanese March coup d'état	9 March – 15 May 1945	Indochina	None	Japan	Defeat
Operation Tiderace	4–12 September 1945	Singapore	United Kingdom British India Australia	Japan	Victory

=== Fourth Republic (1946–1958) ===
Battle	Date	Location	Allies	Enemies	Result
Indochina War (1946–1954)
Battle of Hanoi	December 1946	Vietnam	None	(North Vietnam) Việt Minh	Victory
Operation Papillon	April 1947	Vietnam	None	(North Vietnam) Việt Minh	Victory
Battle of Cao Bằng	October 1947 – 4 September 1949	Vietnam	None	(North Vietnam) Việt Minh	Defeat
Operation Léa	7 October – 15 November 1947	Vietnam	None	(North Vietnam) Việt Minh	Victory
Operation Ceinture	20 November – 22 December 1947	Vietnam	None	(North Vietnam) Việt Minh	Victory
Battle of Phu Tong Hoa	25 July 1948	Vietnam	None	(North Vietnam) Việt Minh	Victory
Battle of Đông Khê	15–18 September 1950	Vietnam	None	(North Vietnam) Việt Minh	Defeat
Battle of Route Coloniale 4	1–13 October 1950	Vietnam	None	(North Vietnam) Việt Minh	Defeat
Battle of Vĩnh Yên	19–17 January 1951	Vietnam	None	(North Vietnam) Việt Minh	Victory
Battle of Mạo Khê	23–28 March 1951	Vietnam	None	(North Vietnam) Việt Minh	Victory
Battle of the Day River	30 May – 18 June 1951	Vietnam	None	(North Vietnam) Việt Minh	Victory
Battle of Nghĩa Lộ	3–10 October 1951	Vietnam	None	(North Vietnam) Việt Minh	Victory
Battle of Hòa Bình	10 November 1951 – 25 February 1952	Vietnam	None	(North Vietnam) Việt Minh	Victory
Operation Lorraine	29 October – 8 November 1952	Vietnam	None	(North Vietnam) Việt Minh	Indecisive
Battle of Nà Sản	23 November – 2 December 1952	Vietnam	None	(North Vietnam) Việt Minh	Victory
Operation Bretagne	1 December 1952 – 4 January 1953	Vietnam	None	(North Vietnam) Việt Minh	Victory
Operation Hirondelle	17–19 July 1953	Vietnam	None	(North Vietnam) Việt Minh	Indecisive
Operation Camargue	28 July 1953 – 10 August 1953	Vietnam	None	(North Vietnam) Việt Minh	Indecisive
Operation Brochet	August – October 1953	Vietnam	None	(North Vietnam) Việt Minh	Indecisive
Operation Mouette	15 October – 7 November 1953	Vietnam	None	(North Vietnam) Việt Minh	Victory
Operation Castor	20–22 November 1953	Vietnam	None	(North Vietnam) Việt Minh	Victory
Operation Atlante	20 January 1954 – March 1954	Vietnam	None	(North Vietnam) Việt Minh	Indecisive
Battle of Dien Bien Phu	13 March – 7 May 1954	Vietnam	None	(North Vietnam) Việt Minh	Defeat
Operation Condor	April 1954	Vietnam	None	(North Vietnam) Việt Minh	Defeat
Battle of Mang Yang Pass	24 June – 17 July 1954	Vietnam	None	(North Vietnam) Việt Minh	Defeat
Korean War (1950–1953)
First and Second Battles of Wonju	31 December 1950 – 20 January 1951	South Korea	United Nations	China North Korea	Victory
Battle of the Twin Tunnels	1 February 1951	South Korea	United Nations	China	Victory
Battle of Chipyong-ni	13–15 February 1951	South Korea	United Nations	China	Victory
Battle of Heartbreak Ridge	13 September – 15 October 1951	South Korea	United Nations	North Korea China	Victory
Algerian War (1954–1962)
Battle of Philippeville	20 August 1955	Algeria	None	(Algeria) FLN	Victory
First Battle of El Djorf	22–29 September 1955	Algeria	None	(Algeria) FLN	Defeat
Battle of Algiers	7 January – 8 October 1957	Algeria	None	(Algeria) FLN	Victory
Ambush of Palestro	18 May 1956	Algeria	None	(Algeria) FLN	Defeat
Battle of Agounennda	23–25 May 1957	Algeria	None	(Algeria) FLN	Victory
Battle of Bouzegza	4–12 August 1957	Algeria	None	(Algeria) FLN	Victory
Suez Crisis (1956–1957)
Operation Kadesh	October 1956 – March 1957	Egypt	Israel United Kingdom	Egypt	Victory
Operation Musketeer	November 1956	Egypt	Israel United Kingdom	Egypt	Victory
Ifni War (1957–1958)
Reconquest of Spanish Sahara	10–21 February 1958	Morocco	Spain	Morocco	Victory

=== Fifth Republic (1958–present) ===
Battle	Date	Location	Allies	Enemies	Result
Algerian War (1954–1962)
Operation Jumelles	22 July 1959 – March 1960	Algeria	none	(Algeria) FLN	Victory
Western Sahara War (1975–1991)
Opération Lamantin	December 1977 – July 1978	Western Sahara	Morocco Mauritania	Polisario Front / SADR	Indecisive
Shaba II (1978)
Battle of Kolwezi	18 May 1978	Congo	Zaire Belgium	FNLC	Victory
Chadian–Libyan conflict (1978–1987)
Operation Manta	1983–1984	Chad	None	Libya	Indecisive
Ouadi Doum air raid	16 February 1986	Libya	None	Libya	Victory
Operation Epervier	1986 – 1 August 2014	Chad	None	Libya	Indecisive
Gulf War (1990–1991)
Opération Daguet	15 January 1991	Kuwait	Coalition of the Gulf War	Iraq	Victory
Gulf War air campaign	17–23 January 1991	Iraq	Coalition of the Gulf War	Iraq	Victory
Djiboutian Civil War (1991–1994)
Djiboutian Civil War	November 1991 – December 1994	Djibouti	Djibouti	FRUD Movement	Victory
Somali Civil War (1991–present)
Operation Restore Hope	9 December 1992 – 4 May 1993	Somalia	United Nations	(Somalia) Various Somali factions	Defeat
NATO intervention in Bosnia and Herzegovina (1993–1995)
Operation Medak Pocket	9–17 September 1993	Bosnia and Herzegovina	United Nations; Canada	Croatia; Serb Krajina	Victory
Battle of Vrbanja Bridge	27 May 1995	Bosnia and Herzegovina	United Nations	Republika Srpska	Victory
Operation Deliberate Force	30 August – 20 September 1995	Bosnia and Herzegovina	NATO; United Nations	Republika Srpska	Victory
Rwandan Civil War 1990 - 93
Opération Turquoise	22 Jun – 21 Aug 1994	Rwanda	Rwanda	Rwandan Patriotic Front	Defeat
Kosovo War (1999)
1999 NATO bombing of Yugoslavia	24 March – 10 June 1999	Serbia	NATO	Federal Republic of Yugoslavia	Victory
War in Afghanistan (2001–2021)
Mission Héraclès	November 2001 – February 2002	Arabian Sea / Afghanistan	ISAF	(Afghanistan) Taliban insurgents al-Qaeda	Victory
Operation Anaconda	1–18 March 2002	Afghanistan	ISAF	(Afghanistan) Taliban insurgents al-Qaeda	Victory
Battle of Afghanya	8 April 2008	Afghanistan	ISAF	(Afghanistan) Taliban insurgents al-Qaeda	Victory
Uzbin Valley ambush	18 August 2008	Afghanistan	ISAF	(Afghanistan) Taliban insurgents Hezb-e-Islami Gulbuddin	Victory
Operation Eagle's Summit	27 August – 5 September 2008	Afghanistan	ISAF	(Afghanistan) Taliban insurgents	Victory
Battle of Alasay	14–23 March 2009	Afghanistan	ISAF	(Afghanistan) Taliban insurgents	Victory
Operation Moshtarak	13 February 2010 – 25 February 2010	Afghanistan	ISAF	(Afghanistan) Taliban insurgents	Victory
First Ivorian Civil War (2002–2007)
2004 French–Ivorian clashes	6 November 2004	Côte d'Ivoire	None	Côte d'Ivoire	Victory
Chadian Civil War (2005–2010)
Battle of N'Djamena	2–4 February 2008	Chad	Chadian National Army	UFDD rebels UFDD-F rebels RFC rebels	Victory
Invasion of Anjouan (2008)
Operation Democracy in Comoros	24–25 March 2008	Comoros	Comoros African Union	Anjouan	Victory
Campaign against Somali pirates (2008–present)
Operation Thalathine	4 April 2008	Gulf of Aden	None	Somali Pirates	Victory
Operation Atalanta	June 2008 – present	Arabian Sea	European Union Norway Ukraine Montenegro	Somali Pirates	Ongoing
September 16, 2008 incident off Somalia	16 September 2008	Arabian Sea	None	Somali Pirates	Victory
April 9, 2009 incident off Somalia	9 April 2009	Arabian Sea	Germany	Somali Pirates	Victory
War in Somalia (2009–present)
Operation Enduring Freedom – Horn of Africa	January 31, 2009 – Present	Somalia	NATO Non-NATO allies	Harakat al-Shabaab Mujahedeen (HSM) Hizbul Islam (HI); Foreign Mujahideen al-Qaeda	Ongoing
Operation Linda Nchi	October 2011 – June 2012	Somalia	Kenya Somalia United States	Al-Shabaab	Victory
Military intervention in Libya (2011)
Battle of Misrata	18 March – 15 May 2011	Libya	(Libya) Anti-Gaddafi forces NATO	(History of Libya under Muammar Gaddafi) Gaddafi loyalists	Victory
Second Battle of Benghazi	19–20 March 2011	Libya	(Libya) Anti-Gaddafi forces	(History of Libya under Muammar Gaddafi) Gaddafi loyalists	Victory
Opération Harmattan	19–31 March 2011	Libya	None	(History of Libya under Muammar Gaddafi) Gaddafi loyalists	Victory
Battle of Ajdabiya	21–26 March 2011	Libya	(Libya) Anti-Gaddafi forces NATO	(History of Libya under Muammar Gaddafi) Gaddafi loyalists	Victory
Operation Unified Protector	23 March – 31 October 2011	Mediterranean / Libya	NATO	(History of Libya under Muammar Gaddafi) Gaddafi loyalists	Victory
Battle of Sirte	15 September – 20 October 2011	Libya	(Libya) Anti-Gaddafi forces NATO	(History of Libya under Muammar Gaddafi) Gaddafi loyalists	Victory
Second Ivorian Civil War (2011)
Battle of Abidjan	31 March – 11 April 2011	Côte d'Ivoire	(Ivory Coast) Forces Nouvelles United Nations	(Ivory Coast) Gbagbo loyalists Liberian mercenaries Young Patriots of Abidjan militia	Victory
Northern Mali conflict (2012)
Battle of Konna	10–12 January 2013	Mali	Mali	Islamists	Victory
Opération Serval	11 January 2013 – 15 July 2014	Mali	Mali	Independent State of Azawad; Islamists	Victory
Battle of Diabaly	14–21 January 2013	Mali	Mali	Islamists	Victory
Second battle of Gao	27 January 2013	Mali	None	Islamists	Victory
Third battle of Gao	9–11 February 2013	Mali	Mali	Islamists	Victory
Fourth battle of Gao	20–23 February 2013	Mali	Mali; Niger	Islamists	Victory
Operation Panther	19 February 2013 – 25 March 2013	Mali	None	Islamists	Victory
Battle of Iminenas	27 February – 1 March 2013	Mali	Mali	Islamists	Victory
Battle of Tin Keraten	6 March 2013	Mali	Mali	Islamists	Victory
Battle of Djebok	12–17 March 2013	Mali	Mali; Niger; Guinea	Islamists	Victory
Battle of Timbuktu	20–21 March 2013	Mali	Mali	Islamists	Victory
5th Battle of Gao	24 March 2013	Mali	None	Islamists	Victory
Second Battle of Timbuktu	30 March 2013 – 1 April 2013	Mali	Mali	Islamists	Victory
Battle of Agadez and Arlit	20 May 2013	Niger	Niger	Islamists	Victory
Battle of Araouane	10 December 2013	Mali	None	Islamists	Victory
Central African Republic conflict (2012–13)
Operation Sangaris	5 December 2013	Central African Republic	MISCA	(Central African Republic) Séléka (Central African Republic) Anti-balaka	Victory
Insurgency in the Maghreb (2002–present)
Operation Barkhane	1 August 2014	Sahel	Mauritania Mali Niger Burkina Faso Chad	Islamists	Ongoing
Iraqi insurgency (2011–present)
Siege of Amirli	11 June 2014 – 31 August 2014	Iraq	Iraq; Iraqi Kurdistan; United States	Islamic State	Victory
Northern Iraq offensive (August 2014)	1–19 August 2014	Iraq	Iraq; Iraqi Kurdistan; United States	Islamic State	Indecisive
Battle of Zumar	31 August – 25 October 2014	Iraq	Iraqi Kurdistan; United States	Islamic State	Victory
2014 military intervention against ISIS	16 June 2014 – present	Iraq	Australia; United Kingdom; Denmark; Belgium; Canada; United States	Islamic State	Ongoing
Opération Chammal	19 September 2014 – present	Iraq	None	Islamic State	Ongoing
Battle of Suq al Ghazi	15 September 2014	Iraq	Iraqi Kurdistan; Iraq; United Kingdom; United States	Islamic State	Victory
Second Battle of Tikrit (March–April 2015)	2 March 2015 – 17 April 2015	Iraq	Iran; Iraq; United Kingdom; United States	Islamic State	Victory
Syrian Civil War
2018 bombing of Damascus and Homs	14 April 2018	Syria	United States; United Kingdom	Syria	Indecisive

== See also ==
- Military history of France
- List of wars involving France
- List of battles involving France (disambiguation)
- French Armed Forces
- Deployments of the French military
