= Battle of Quiévrain (1792) =

Battle of the War of the First Coalition

- Part of the War of the First Coalition
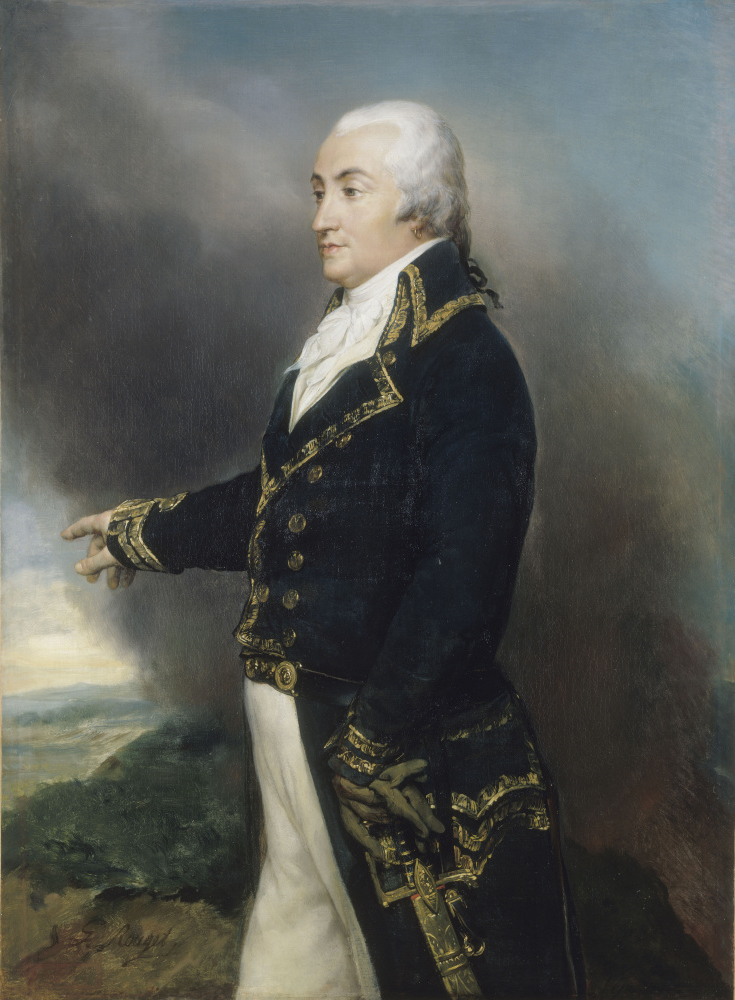
- 1834 painting of general Biron.
Date	28 and 30 April 1792
Location	Quiévrain, Belgium
Result	French victory – 1st battle Austrian victory – 2nd battle

Belligerents
(Constitutional Cabinet of Louis XVI) Kingdom of France	(Habsburg monarchy) Austria

Commanders and leaders
(Constitutional Cabinet of Louis XVI) Armand-Louis de Gontaut Biron (Constitutional Cabinet of Louis XVI) Auguste Marie Henri Picot de Dampierre	(Habsburg monarchy) Johann Peter Beaulieu

Strength
15,000	

The Battle of Quiévrain was a pair of skirmishes between the Habsburg monarchy and the Kingdom of France in late April 1792 during the War of the First Coalition.

On 28 April, there was a minor skirmish at Quiévrain, just across the Franco-Belgian border, resulting in a victory for the French army under the command of general Armand-Louis de Gontaut Biron. However, although Biron advanced and planned to take the city of Mons and eventually Brussels, he judged his forces were not strong enough and decided to retreat. On 30 April, as his troops were passing by Quiévrain again, a false alarm of an Austrian attack caused the soldiers to panic, and they fled back to Valenciennes in a disorderly fashion. His ally Théobald Dillon, who served with Biron under marshal Rochambeau during this invasion, suffered an even worse fate during the battle of Marquain (29 April), some 35 kilometres to the northeast.
