= Operation Atlante =

- Part of the First Indochina War
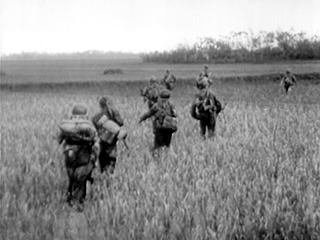
- French troops sweep paddy fields.
Date	January 20, 1954 – March 1954
Location	French Indochina
Result	Aborted

Belligerents
French Union: France; French Indochina; State of Vietnam	Democratic Republic of Vietnam: (North Vietnam) Việt Minh

Commanders and leaders
Henri Navarre; Grout de Beaufort	Võ Nguyên Giáp; Nguyễn Chánh

Strength
~25,000	~30,000

Operation Atlante was a military operation of the First Indochina War which consisted of three stages, Aréthuse, Axelle and Attila, taking place across six months from January 20, 1954. French Army commander General Henri Navarre employed 53 battalions of French infantry and artillery in an attempt to ensnare 30,000 Việt Minh troops thought to be secreted among the 2,000,000 strong local population in the marshy lagoons between Da Nang and Nha Trang in southern Vietnam. The objective was to pacify the local populace and re-establish the sovereignty of the Bảo Đại government.

Through initial deployment across four weeks of amphibious landings on the coastline in Aréthuse between January 20 and 29, the French forces were continually reinforced through eight weeks of Axelle. Attila, envisaged as a two-month stage where the full French force closed out the Việt Minh, was made infeasible come March as French casualties mounted. Snipers and mines whittled the French force down, while Việt Minh attacks in the highlands diverted French attention. The French faced a series of sacrificed rearguard actions for each village while the main Việt Minh forces remained elusive. Võ Nguyên Giáp's troops gathered momentum and began to strike back, and together with the conduct of the Vietnamese National Army (VNA), this forced the French to abandon Atlante. Navarre would later declare Aréthuse and Axelle as successful, while Attilla remained unrealised.

Atlante led to much consideration among the French command. The conduct of the VNA prompted French Chief of Defence Staff Paul Ely to comment that "It is now clear that, however sceptical I was when Monsieur Pleven asked my opinion on the possibility of the Vietnamese relieving us in the short term, I was still too optimistic. They are incapable of doing anything serious for several years." It had been the VNA's first major test in military operations. Chief of the Air Staff General Fay wrote that "It would have brought better results if we had consistently concentrated the maximum of bombs on one or two points and ensured the almost permanent cutting of the route at these points by harassing the repair work." Navarre received criticism for focusing on Atlante while operations were taking place at Dien Bien Phu, however historian Martin Windrow argues this to be unjustified given the contrasting nature of the two events.
