= Operation Papillon =

- Part of the First Indochina War
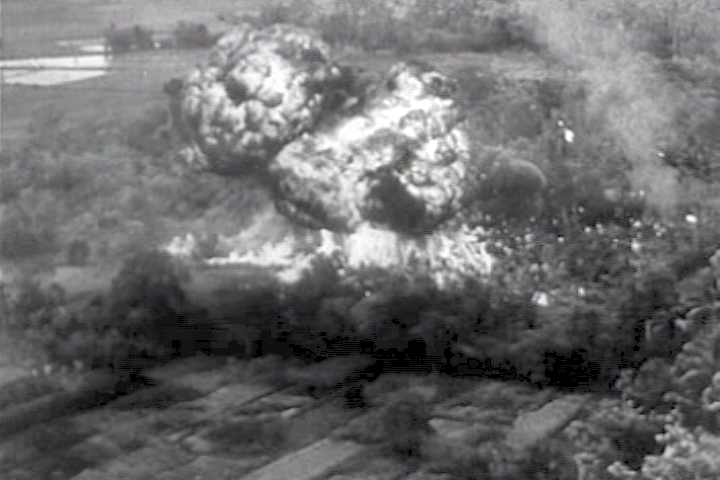
- A Bearcat of the Aéronavale drops napalm on Viet Minh positions
Date	April 1947
Location	Hòa Bình Province, French Indochina

Belligerents
French Union: France; French Indochina	Democratic Republic of Vietnam: (North Vietnam) Việt Minh

Operation Papillon was a large scale air and ground assault on the Viet Minh at Hòa Bình by the French Army and Air Force in April 1947, during the early stages of the First Indochina War.
