= Battle of Araouane (2013) =

Coordinates: 18.9050°N 3.5283°W

- Part of Northern Mali conflict
Date	10 December 2013
Location	Araouane, Mali
Result	French victory

Belligerents
France	AQIM

Strength
Unknown	Unknown

Casualties and losses
(France) None	19 KIA, 8 captured

In early December 2013, the French army launched an operation in the Timbuktu region, where many jihadist movements were reported. One hundred vehicles and helicopters were involved. Neither the Malian forces nor MINUSMA took part in the operation. The French combed an area between the towns of Bouje-Baya and Araouane and attacked a katiba of Al-Qaeda in the Islamic Maghreb. A Malian officer said that "the elements of the terrorist group fought to the end. At least 19 members of the movement were killed. There were no wounded or dead on the French side.

The French took also at least 8 prisoners. The jihadists were lightly armed, some wore explosives belts. On 15 December, the French Foreign Minister Laurent Fabius confirmed that 19 men were killed on the side of the jihadists. The French army continued its offensive in the following days further north, into the region Taoudenni. The likely presence of several jihadists in the region, such as Al-Mourabitoun, MUJAO or other groups, was discussed as well as the presence of Mokhtar Belmokhtar. The French army announced that the operation ended on December 23. The result was a score of "terrorists" killed while a jihadist training camp and two supply points were discovered. The camp included a gas station, buried stock mechanical parts, pickup hidden under straw roofs, caches of drugs and firing ranges. It was evacuated three days before the arrival of the French.
