= Battle of Tin Keraten =

Coordinates: 16.4167°N 0.8167°E

- Part of Northern Mali conflict
- Battle of Tin Keraten (Mali)
| Date | March 6, 2013 |
| Location | Tin Keraten, Gao Region, Mali |
| Result | French-Malian Victory |

Belligerents
| France Mali | MOJWA |

Strength
| Unknown | ~20 |

Casualties and losses
| (France) 1 KIA (Mali) 1 KIA, 4 wounded | 10 KIA |

On March 6, 2013, French and Malian forces took control of the Wadi Tin Keraten area, located 100 km east of Gao and northeast of Imenas. When Malian soldiers got near Tin Keraten, they were attacked by Islamists from MOJWA. French ground troops arrived supported by Tiger helicopters and Gazelles along with some warplanes. Four Malian soldiers were wounded during the battle and a French soldier, sergeant Wilfried Pingaud of the 68th Artillery Regiment in Africa, was mortally wounded. He was transported to Gao, where he died of his wounds. The Islamists lost about ten men according to French reports.

== Background ==
After the victory of the Battle of Iminenas, the French and Malian forces continued their war against the Islamist Jihadist coalition of MOJWA, AQIM, Ansar Dine and Al-Mulathamen. On March 5, the Franco-Malian column reached the Araoue where the soldiers discovered two tons of ammunition, including dozens of rockets. Not being able to be carried away, they were immediately destroyed. The next target of the Franco-Malian forces was the wadi of Tin Keraten, located north-east of Imenas, 100 kilometers east of Gao. Hoping to surprise the jihadists, the French decided to bypass Tin Keraten then turn around and advance directly on it.

== MOJWA ambush ==
In the morning of March 6, the Malian and French forces were approaching the wadi of Tin Keraten. However, they were spotted by about twenty MUJAO fighters who ambushed the column. During the fighting, the Malians were ordered to retreat so they would be replaced by VBCI armored vehicles attacking jihadists from two sides. The French then deployed some Tigre and Gazelle helicopters, as well as Mirage 2000D fighter planes. Finally, the men of the CPA-20 located about twenty MOJWA fighters who ambushed them before, and dropped bombs on them. Only four survived, and managed to retreat safely. The fight lasted only ten minutes, and after the withdrawal and the killing of the jihadists, the Franco-Malian forces retreated back to Gao to treat their wounded. During the fight, one French soldier, and one Malian killed, as well as about 10 MOJWA.
