= Battle of Suq al Ghazi =

2014 battle in Iraq

- Part of the War in Iraq (2013–2017), and the War against the Islamic State
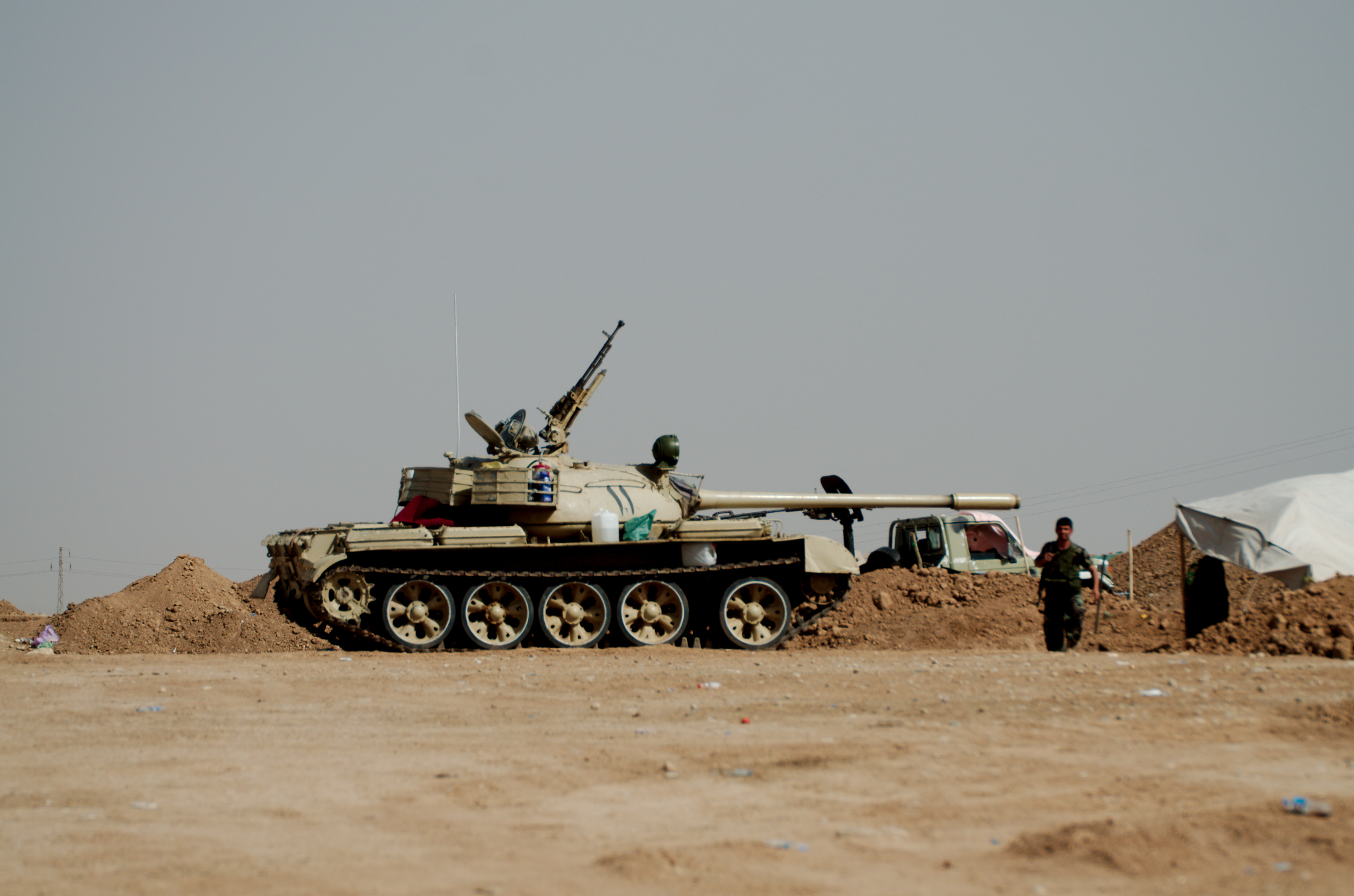
- An Iraqi Army tank in combat near Suq al Ghazi
Date	September 15, 2014
Location	Suq al Ghazi, near Baghdad, Iraq
Result	US/Iraqi victory

Combatants
United States; United Kingdom; France; Iraq	Islamic State

Commanders and leaders
(United States) Barack Obama (France) Francois Hollande (United Kingdom) David Cameron	(Islamic State) Abu Bakr al-Baghdadi

Strength
(Iraq) 100 soldiers	(Islamic State) 300 militants

Casualties and losses
(Iraq) 5 killed	23 fighters killed

The Battle of Suq al Ghazi took place on September 15, 2014.

== The battle ==
On September 15, 2014, IS gunmen, accompanied by local jihadist militias, stormed an Iraqi military base. Not knowing what to do, the Iraqi soldiers made frantic calls for help. Inside the base, IS ordered the soldiers to get in a dozen trucks when they arrived. The IS fighters reportedly shot at civilians and anyone who tried to intervene before raising the IS Black Standard in place of the Iraqi Flag.

After receiving calls from help, and seeing that IS intended to capture Suq al Ghazi, US, UK and French drones arrived and fired at IS positions, killing multiple fighters. The remaining IS fighters fled, only to be engaged by Iraqi tanks.

Iraqi tanks fired at the remaining fighters. US drones arrived and began bombing them as well.

== Aftermath ==
IS permanently left Suq al Ghazi on September 16, 2014, making the battle the shortest one in the history of the conflict.
