= Théobald Dillon =

French Royal Army officer (1745–1792)

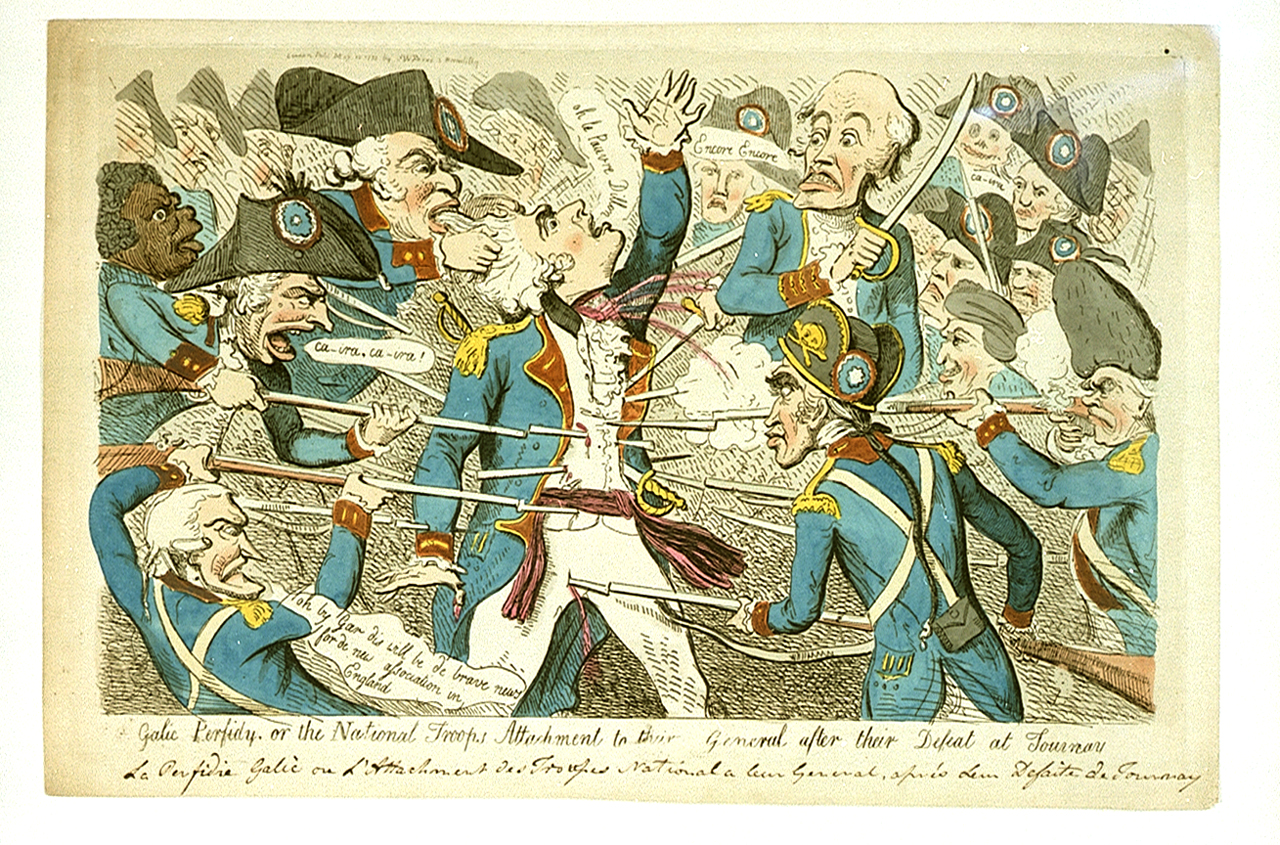
A British caricature of Dillon's death

Théobald Dillon (1745 – 29 April 1792) was a French Royal Army officer. He was a distant cousin of general Arthur Dillon (who also had a brother named Theobald).

He entered Dillon's Regiment as a cadet in 1761, gradually rose to be a lieutenant-colonel (1780), took part in the Capture of Grenada (1779) and the siege of Savannah in 1779, was appointed a knight of St. Louis in 1781, was authorised to wear the Order of Cincinnatus in 1785, and was awarded a pension of 1,500 francs in 1786. He became a brigadier-general in 1791.

On 29 April 1792, following the loss of a skirmish with Austrian forces, Dillon was murdered by his own men outside the city of Lille. The troops apparently believed that their defeat by the Austrians was the result of a conspiracy on the part of Dillon, whom they called a "traitor and aristocrat".
