= Battle of Marquain =

Battle of the War of the First Coalition

Coordinates: 50.6000°N 3.3170°E

- Part of the War of the First Coalition
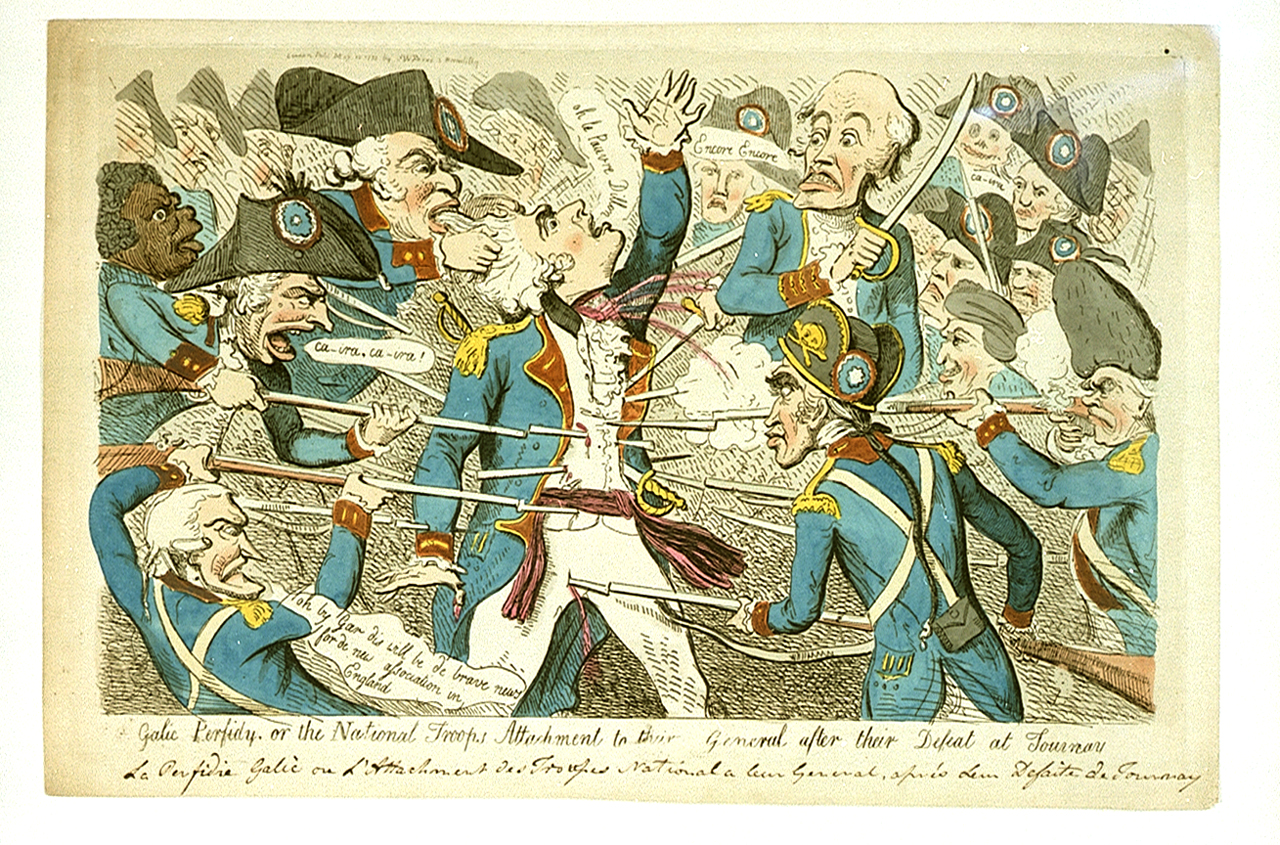
- Galic Perfidy, or the National Troops Attachment to their General after their Defeat at Tournay
Date	29 April 1792
Location	Marquain, Belgium
Result	Austrian victory

Belligerents
(Constitutional Cabinet of Louis XVI) Kingdom of France	(Habsburg monarchy) Austria

Commanders and leaders
(Constitutional Cabinet of Louis XVI) Théobald Dillon †	(Habsburg monarchy) Louis-François de Civalart

Strength
2,300	3,000

The Battle of Marquain was a conflict between Austria and the Kingdom of France during the War of the First Coalition. It took place on 29 April 1792 and ended in a French defeat.

== Background ==
In early 1792, as the French Revolution was gradually radicalising, and conservative royalist Armées des Émigrés were forming just across the borders in cities such as Koblenz – readying to invade and reverse the Revolution, tensions rose between France and other European states about the future status of the Bourbon monarchy. The Girondin majority in the Legislative Assembly favoured war, especially with Austria, in order to display the Revolution's strength and defend its achievements (such as the Declaration of the Rights of the Man and of the Citizen of 1789 and the early beginnings of parliamentary democracy) against a possible return to an absolutist Ancien Régime. However, there was a real risk that France would be overwhelmed by foreign forces if a large anti-French coalition were to be formed.

Major-general Charles François Dumouriez was appointed to Minister of Foreign Affairs in March 1792, and by mid-April had managed to obtain the neutrality of all European great powers except Austria and Prussia through cunning diplomacy. Meanwhile, he organised plans to incite local insurrection in the Austrian Netherlands by cooperating with the Committee of United Belgians and Liégois, who represented remnants of the rebel armies formed during the recently failed anti-Austrian Brabant Revolution and Liège Revolution (August 1789 – January 1791).

== Invasion ==
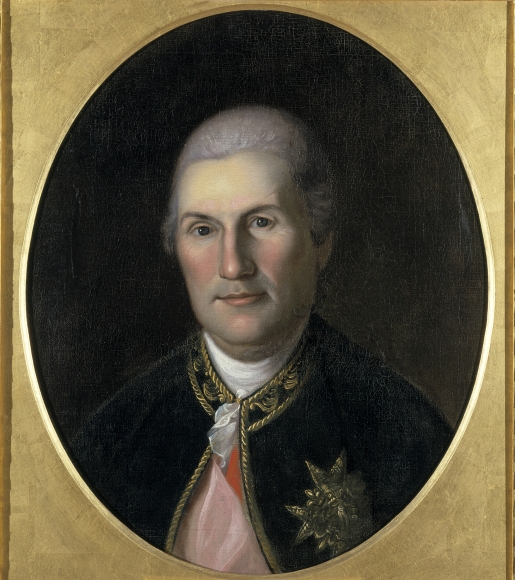
A portrait of Jean-Baptiste Donatien de Vimeur, comte de Rochambeau

Finally, France declared war on Austria on 20 April 1792. Dumouriez planned to defeat the Austrian army within 15 days to achieve a successful quick victory. From Dunkirk to Strasbourg, the French army's northern frontier comprised 164,000 soldiers, under the leadership of general Lafayette (targets: from Givet to Namur and Liège), marshal Luckner (targets: Flemish cities such as Menen and Kortrijk) and marshal Rochambeau (targets: Quiévrain, Mons and Brussels). Rochambeau's subordinate general Biron and maréchal du camp Théobald Dillon would lead the invasion. The French army was plagued by troubles: both Lafayette and Rochambeau were convinced royalists, and had doubts about the republican minister's intentions as well as the feasibility of his strategies; the troops were poorly equipped, many of them untrained volunteers, and they distrusted their aristocratic officers; and finally, queen Marie Antoinette (herself an Austrian, and rightfully fearing that further republican radicalisation would cost her life) secretly passed on this and later war plans to the Austrian government in Brussels, with king Louis XVI's approval.

During Biron's attempts to capture Quiévrain and Mons, Dillon made a feint towards Tournai; his force was intended as a decoy to distract the Austrians. Leaving Lille with 10 squadrons, 6 battalions and 6 guns, he met the Austrian major-general Louis-François de Civalart, encamped with 3,000 men on the heights above Marquain. Austrian skirmishers attacked the French vanguard so heavily that the French realized Civalart wished to bring on a pitched battle, whereas Dillon had orders to avoid one.

== Battle ==
Seeing the enemy coming down to meet him and unsure of his own troops (who had frequently been insubordinate on the march from Lille), Dillon obeyed his orders and commanded a retreat. At the first sign of a French withdrawal, the Austrians fired their guns several times despite being out of range, with none of their shots even reaching Dillon's rearguard. Despite the French troops' fear of their own generals, the cavalry squadrons covering the retreat panicked just as at Quiévrain. Hearing the guns, they rushed into their own infantry shouting "Sauve qui peut, nous sommes trahis" ("Every man for himself, we are betrayed"). This spread confusion in the French force, which fled in disorder across Baisieux towards Lille, leaving behind its baggage, munitions and all but 2 guns. Dillon tried in vain to rally his retreating troops before the enemy could attack and was shot by one of his own troops.

The force re-formed level with the Fives gate, with a mixture of soldiers from different regiments forming a garrison. Dillon's second-in-command, the engineer colonel Pierre-François Berthois, was stopped by the soldiers, hung from one of the battlements and fired him and 3 or 4 prisoners from a gun. Wounded, Dillon was shot in a cart and bayonetted. His body was tied to the cart and dragged through the streets as far as the Grand Place, where it was thrown on a fire, made up of signs from several neighbouring shops. Dillon's cousin Arthur complained to the Assembly and his murderers were punished and his widow granted a pension to raise her children.

== Aftermath ==
When both his subordinates Dillon and Biron failed in their missions, Rochambeau resigned. On 30 April, Lafayette heard of the defeats and Rochambeau's resignation, cancelled his assault on Namur and Liège as well and awaited new orders from Paris. The Belgian-Liégois Committee was disappointed and felt betrayed, claiming Lafayette could have easily taken both cities by sheer superior numbers.

The complete failure of the Belgian invasion was a great humiliation for the members of the Legislative Assembly, where the leftist Jacobins blamed the Girondins and both accused the royal family of conspiring with the Austrian and Prussian enemy, which was true. It further bolstered radical views that the royals undermined the Revolution's success, and that only republicanism could save it.

== Bibliography ==
- Victoires, conquêtes, désastres, revers et guerres civiles des Français, volume 7
