= Battle of Marengo order of battle =

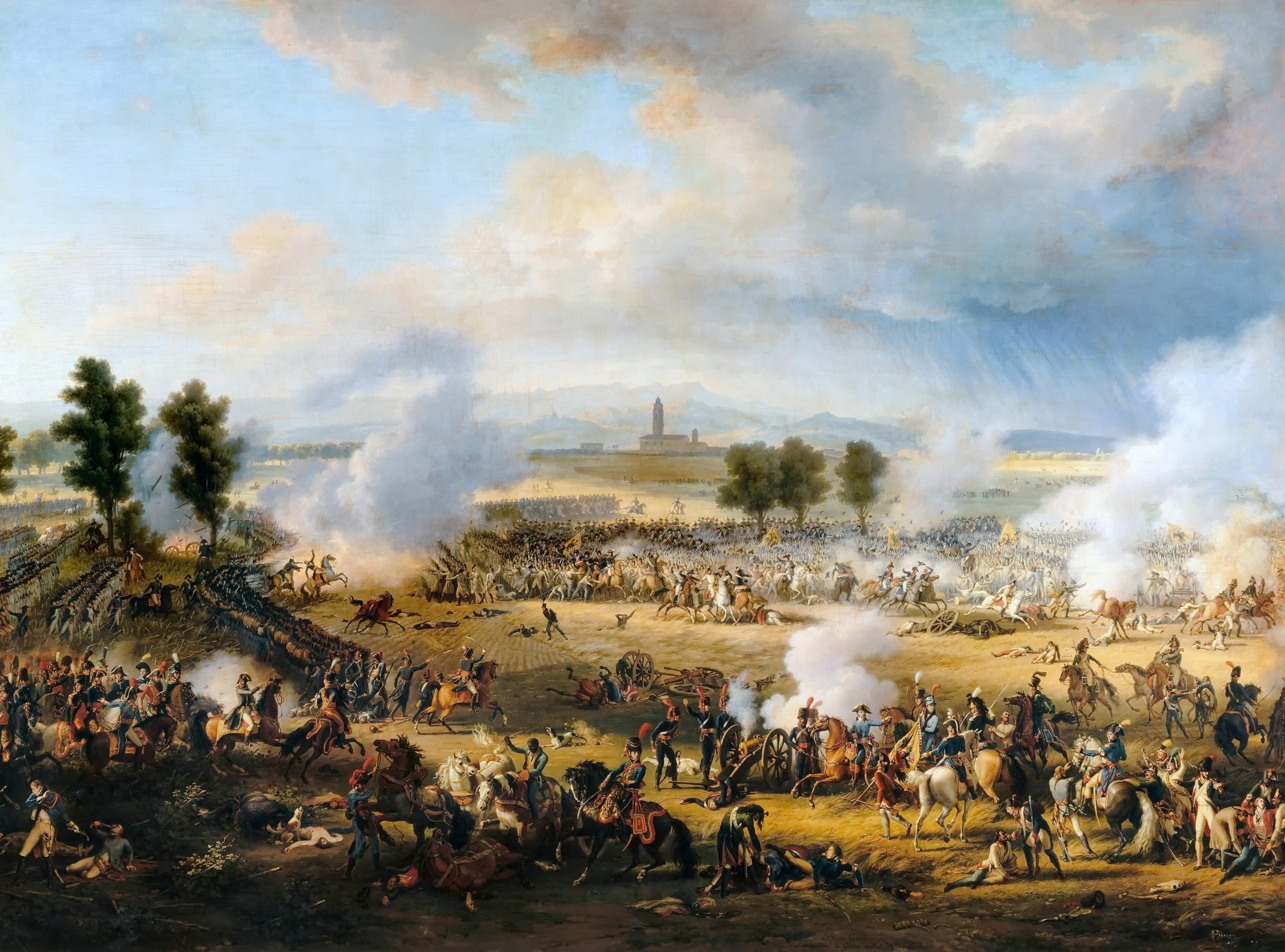
The Battle of Marengo by Louis-François Lejeune, 1801

The Battle of Marengo (14 June 1800) was fought between the French army of First Consul Napoleon Bonaparte and an Habsburg army led by General der Kavallerie Michael von Melas. With Napoleon's army lying across the Habsburg army's line of communications to the west, Melas resolved to attack. Early in the morning, the Habsburg army advanced from the city of Alessandria and took the French army by surprise. It was not until 9:00 am before Melas' army completely moved through a bottleneck at the Bormida River bridges. At first the Austrian attack stalled, slowed by bitter French resistance. By 3:00 pm, the Habsburg army compelled their outnumbered opponents to retreat. Sore from having two horses killed under him, Melas handed over command of the pursuit to a subordinate and went to the rear. Later in the afternoon, a newly-arrived French division suddenly attacked the pursuing Austrians. Combined with a quick burst of cannon fire and a well-timed cavalry charge, the surprise assault caused a complete collapse of the Austrian center column, which fled to the temporary safety of Alessandria. The French suffered at least 7,700 casualties, including two generals killed and five wounded. The Austrians admitted losing 9,416 killed, wounded and missing, but some estimates range as high as 11,000–12,000 casualties. The Austrians lost one general killed and five wounded. The next day, Melas requested an armistice. The victory gave Bonaparte enough bargaining leverage to gain control of northwest Italy during the subsequent negotiations.

== French Army ==
=== General Staff ===
- First Consul Napoleon Bonaparte
  - Commander-in-Chief: General of Division Louis-Alexandre Berthier (acted as Chief of Staff and Reserve Commander)
  - Chief of Staff: General of Division Pierre Dupont de l'Étang
  - Chief Engineer: General of Division Armand Samuel de Marescot
  - Chief of Artillery: General of Brigade Auguste de Marmont
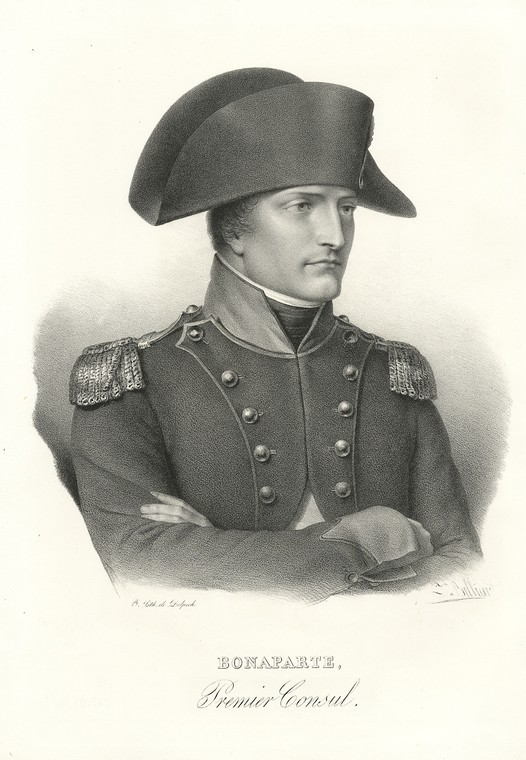
Napoleon Bonaparte

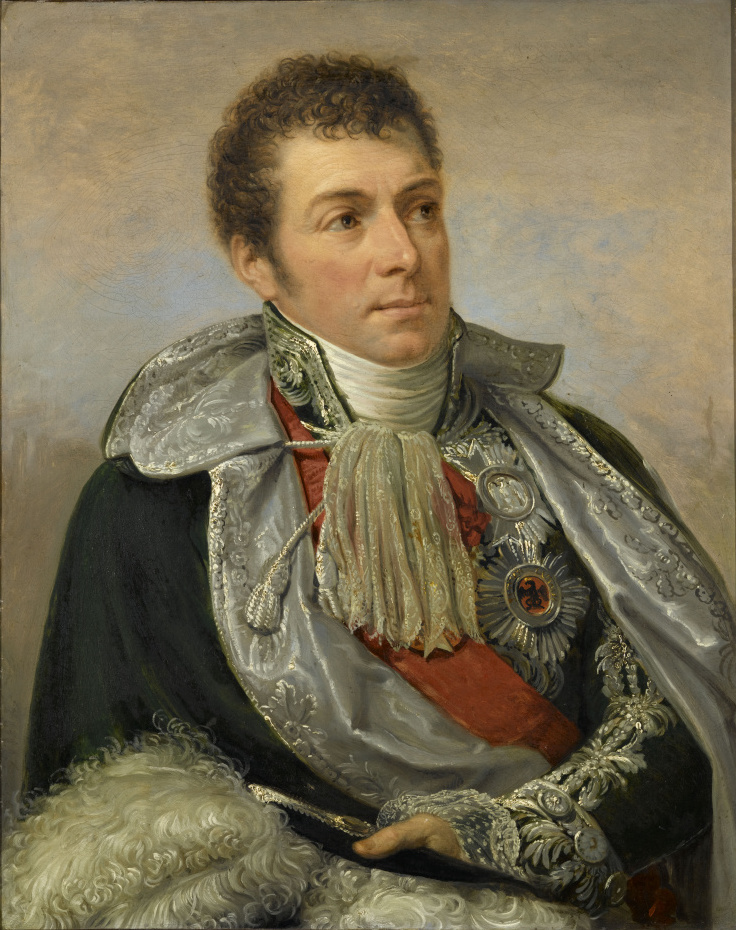
Louis-Alexandre Berthier

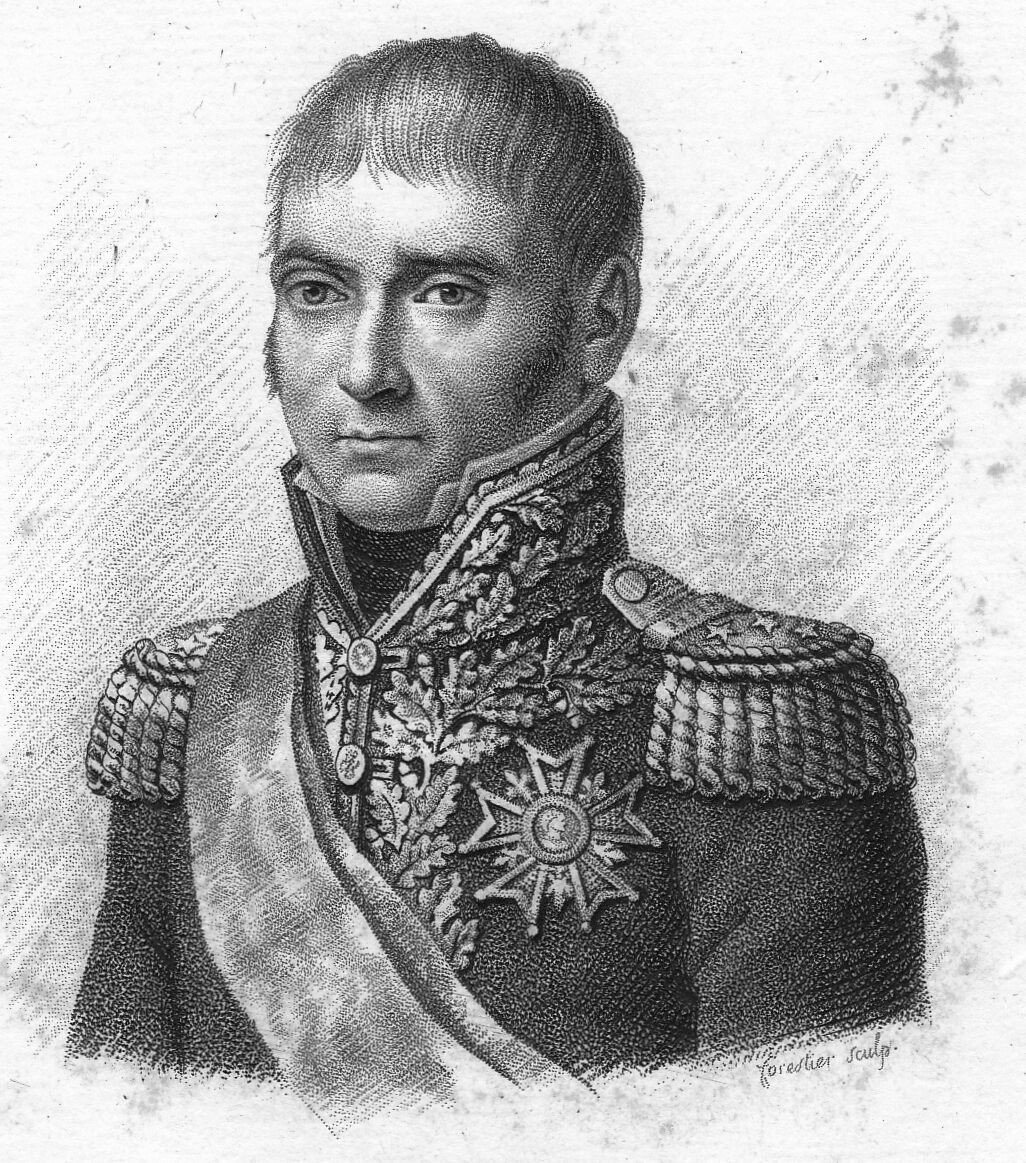
Pierre Dupont de l'Étang

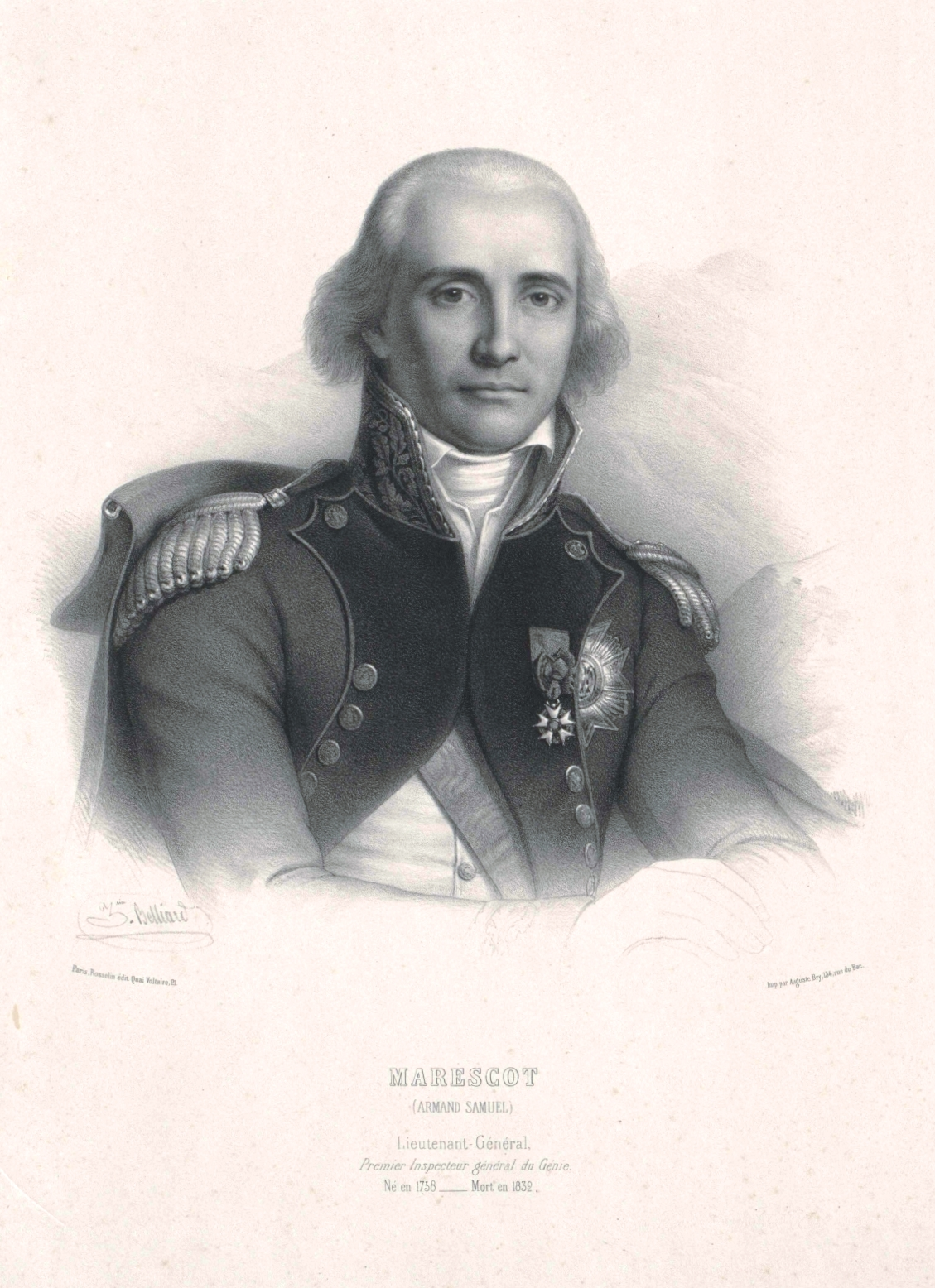
Armand de Marescot

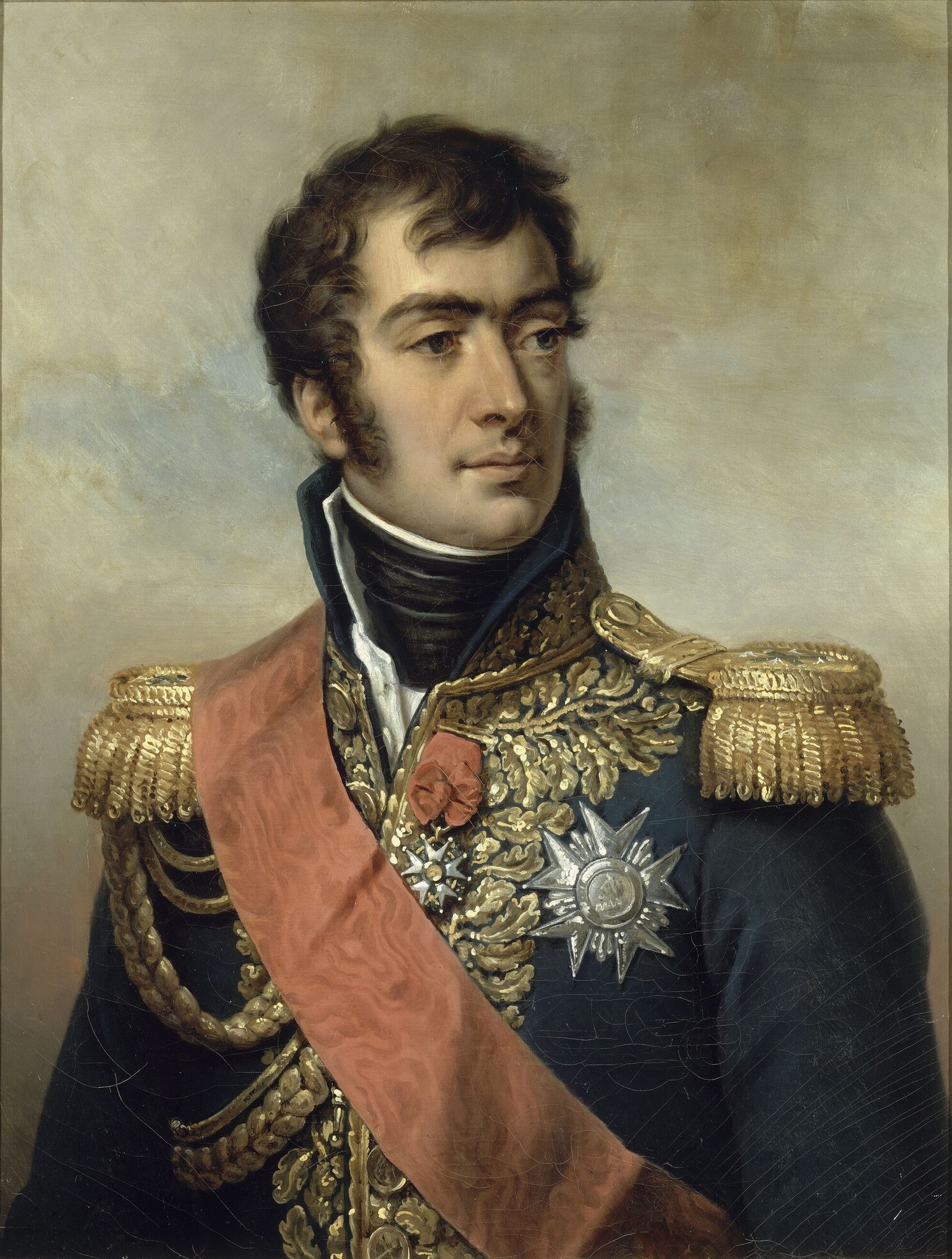
Auguste de Marmont

=== Corps Commanders ===
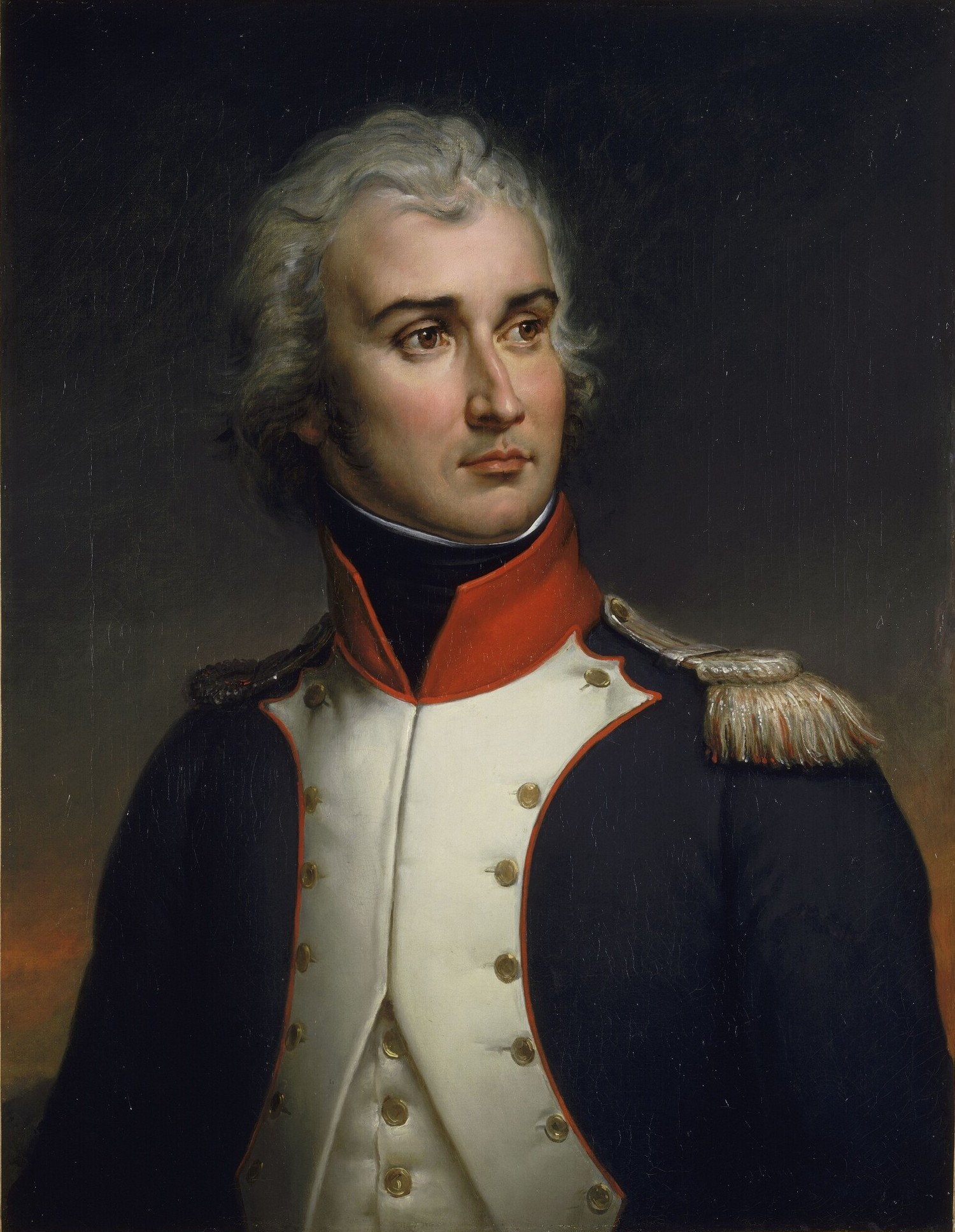
Jean Lannes

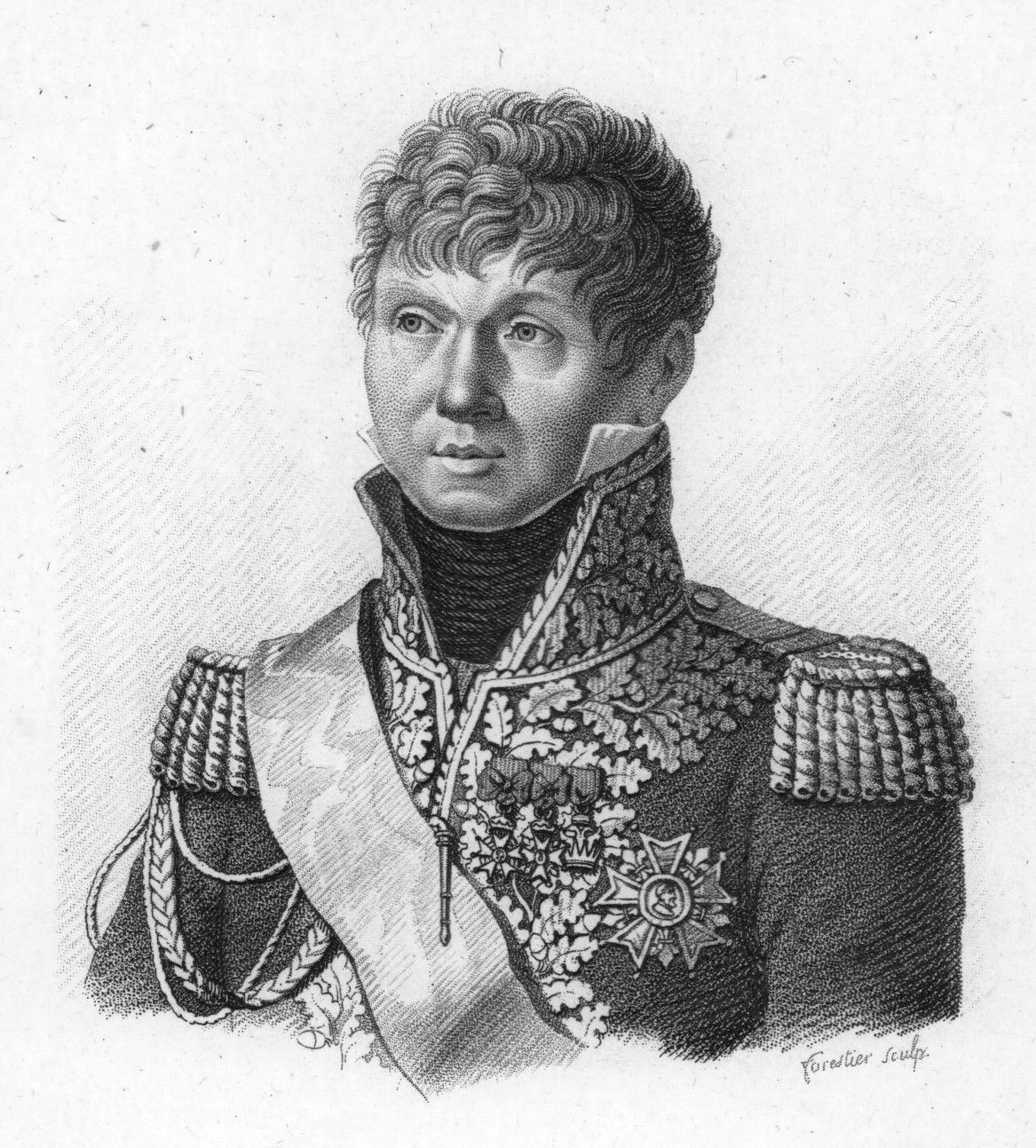
Claude Victor-Perrin

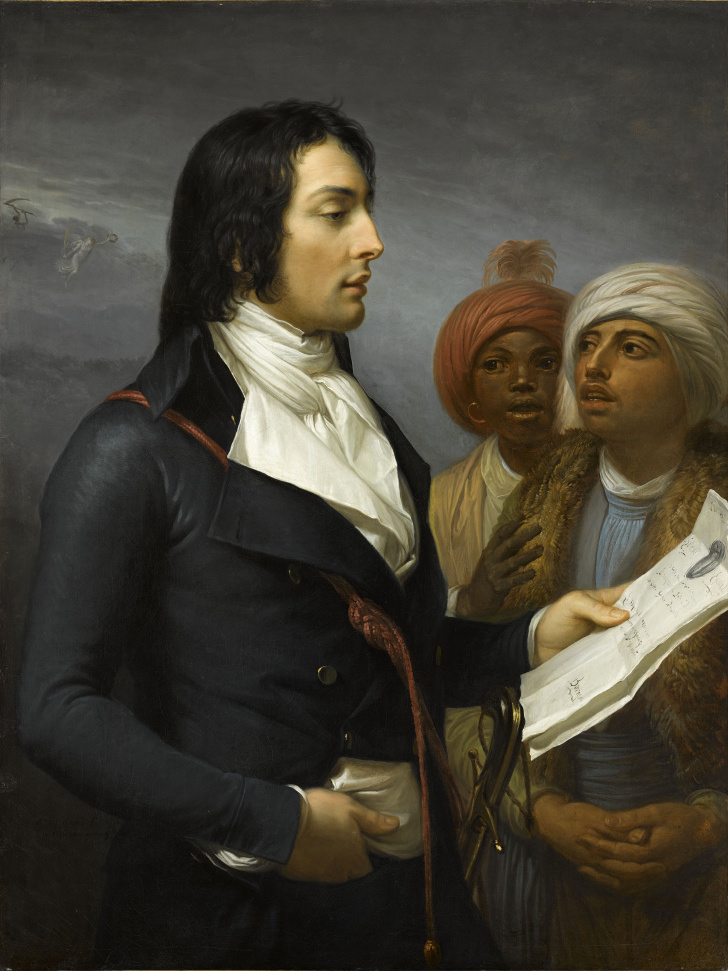
Louis Desaix

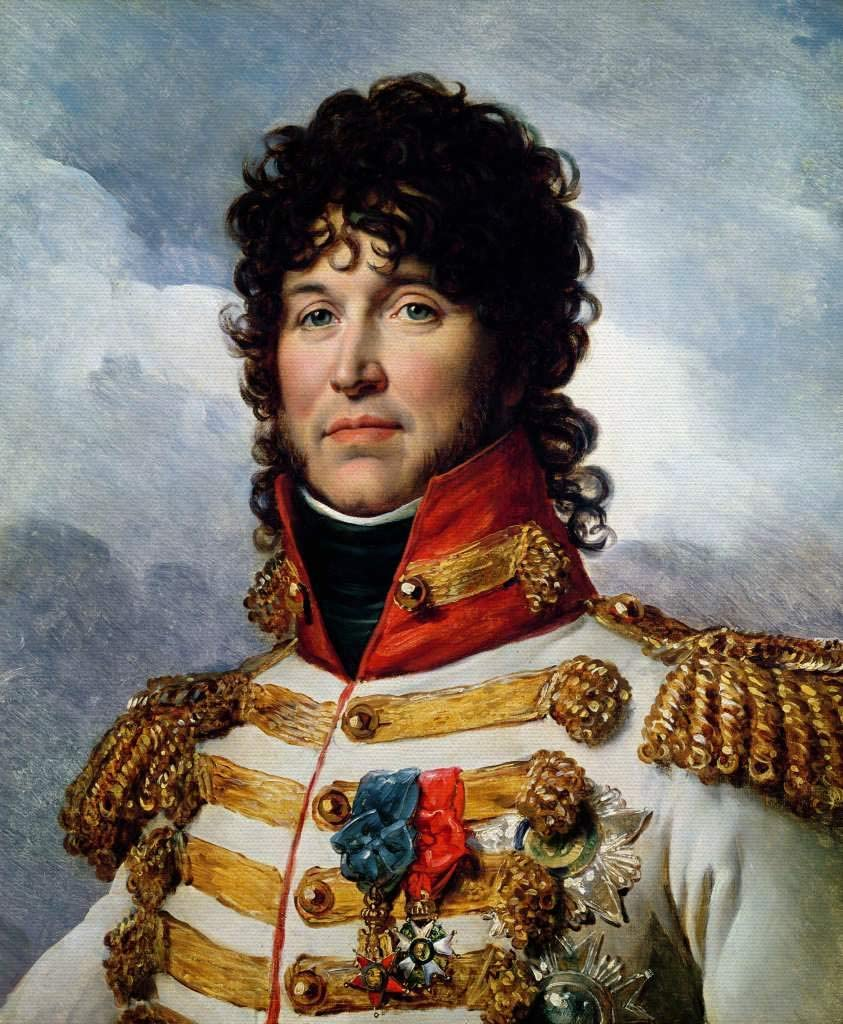
Joachim Murat

=== Organization ===
First Consul Napoleon Bonaparte's French Army at Marengo
Corps	Division	Strength	Brigades (Note: Smith provided the French brigade organizations, the fact that the 19th Light had only 2 battalions, and the number of squadrons per regiment.)	Units	Strength
Corps Lannes; General of Division; Jean Lannes	Advance Guard	1,577	General of Brigade; Joseph Mainoni (WIA)	28th Line Infantry Demi-brigade, 3 battalions	1,577
Corps Lannes; General of Division; Jean Lannes	Division Watrin; General of Division; François Watrin	5,071	General of Brigade; Jean-Pierre Firmin Malher (WIA)	6th Light Infantry Demi-brigade, 3 battalions	1,408
Corps Lannes; General of Division; Jean Lannes	Division Watrin; General of Division; François Watrin	5,071	General of Brigade; Jean-Pierre Firmin Malher (WIA)	40th Line Infantry Demi-brigade, 3 battalions	2,136
Corps Lannes; General of Division; Jean Lannes	Division Watrin; General of Division; François Watrin	5,071	General of Brigade; Claude Ursule Gency	22nd Line Infantry Demi-brigade, 3 battalions	1,527
Corps Lannes; General of Division; Jean Lannes	Artillery	–	None	2nd Horse Artillery Regiment, 2nd Company	6 guns, caliber?
Corps Lannes; General of Division; Jean Lannes	Cavalry	214	None	5th Dragoon Regiment	214 (Note: One squadron of 72 troopers was detached to army headquarters.)
Corps Victor; General of Division; Claude Perrin Victor	Division Gardanne; General of Division; Gaspard Amédée Gardanne	3,178	None	44th Line Infantry Demi-brigade, 3 battalions	2,248
Corps Victor; General of Division; Claude Perrin Victor	Division Gardanne; General of Division; Gaspard Amédée Gardanne	3,178	None	101st Line Infantry Demi-brigade, 3 battalions	930
Corps Victor; General of Division; Claude Perrin Victor	Division Gardanne; General of Division; Gaspard Amédée Gardanne	3,178	None	Unknown	2 3-pound cannons
Corps Victor; General of Division; Claude Perrin Victor	Division Chambarlhac; General of Division; Jacques-Antoine Chambarlhac	6,564	General of Brigade; Jean-Baptiste Herbin Dessaux	24th Light Infantry Demi-brigade, 3 battalions	2,171
Corps Victor; General of Division; Claude Perrin Victor	Division Chambarlhac; General of Division; Jacques-Antoine Chambarlhac	6,564	General of Brigade; Jean-Baptiste Herbin Dessaux	43rd Line Infantry Demi-brigade, 3 battalions	2,326
Corps Victor; General of Division; Claude Perrin Victor	Division Chambarlhac; General of Division; Jacques-Antoine Chambarlhac	6,564	General of Brigade; Olivier Macoux Rivaud (WIA)	96th Line Infantry Demi-brigade, 3 battalions	2,067
Corps Victor; General of Division; Claude Perrin Victor	Division Chambarlhac; General of Division; Jacques-Antoine Chambarlhac	6,564	Artillery	5th Horse Artillery Regiment, 4th Company	1 4-pound cannon 4 guns, caliber?
Corps Victor; General of Division; Claude Perrin Victor	Cavalry	262	None	3rd Cavalry Regiment, 2 squadrons	262
Corps Desaix; General of Division; Louis Desaix †	Division Boudet; General of Division; Jean Boudet (WIA)	4,856	General of Brigade; Louis François Félix Musnier	9th Light Infantry Demi-brigade, 3 battalions	1,833
Corps Desaix; General of Division; Louis Desaix †	Division Boudet; General of Division; Jean Boudet (WIA)	4,856	General of Brigade; Louis François Félix Musnier	30th Line Infantry Demi-brigade, 3 battalions	1,200
Corps Desaix; General of Division; Louis Desaix †	Division Boudet; General of Division; Jean Boudet (WIA)	4,856	General of Brigade; Louis Charles de Guénand (WIA)	59th Line Infantry Demi-brigade, 3 battalions	1,823
Corps Desaix; General of Division; Louis Desaix †	Division Boudet; General of Division; Jean Boudet (WIA)	4,856	Artillery	2nd Horse Artillery Regiment, 3rd Company	4 4-pounder cannons
Corps Desaix; General of Division; Louis Desaix †	Division Boudet; General of Division; Jean Boudet (WIA)	4,856	Artillery	2nd Horse Artillery Regiment, 4th Company	4 8-pound cannons
Corps Desaix; General of Division; Louis Desaix †	Division Monnier; General of Division; Jean-Charles Monnier	3,983	General of Brigade; Claude Carra Saint-Cyr	19th Light Infantry Demi-brigade, 2 battalions	673
Corps Desaix; General of Division; Louis Desaix †	Division Monnier; General of Division; Jean-Charles Monnier	3,983	General of Brigade; Claude Carra Saint-Cyr	70th Line Infantry Demi-brigade, 3 battalions	1,410
Corps Desaix; General of Division; Louis Desaix †	Division Monnier; General of Division; Jean-Charles Monnier	3,983	General of Brigade; Jean Jacques Schilt	72nd Line Infantry Demi-brigade, 3 battalions	1,900
Corps Desaix; General of Division; Louis Desaix †	Division Monnier; General of Division; Jean-Charles Monnier	3,983	Artillery	1st Foot Artillery Regiment, 5th Company	1 8-pound cannon 1 howitzer, 110 men
Corps Desaix; General of Division; Louis Desaix †	Division Monnier; General of Division; Jean-Charles Monnier	3,983	Artillery	6th Foot Artillery Regiment, 10th Company	2 3-pound cannons
Corps Desaix; General of Division; Louis Desaix †	Cavalry	120	None	1st Hussar Regiment, 1 squadron	120
Reserve Cavalry; General of Division; Joachim Murat	None	2,898	General of Brigade; Bernard Étienne Marie Duvignau	6th Dragoon Regiment, 4 squadrons	393
Reserve Cavalry; General of Division; Joachim Murat	None	2,898	General of Brigade; Bernard Étienne Marie Duvignau	8th Dragoon Regiment, 4 squadrons	443
Reserve Cavalry; General of Division; Joachim Murat	None	2,898	General of Brigade; Bernard Étienne Marie Duvignau	12th Horse Chasseur Regiment, 4 squadrons	391
Reserve Cavalry; General of Division; Joachim Murat	None	2,898	General of Brigade; François Etienne de Kellermann	1st Cavalry Regiment	123
Reserve Cavalry; General of Division; Joachim Murat	None	2,898	General of Brigade; François Etienne de Kellermann	2nd Cavalry Regiment, 1 squadron	258
Reserve Cavalry; General of Division; Joachim Murat	None	2,898	General of Brigade; François Etienne de Kellermann	20th Cavalry Regiment, 3 squadrons	191
Reserve Cavalry; General of Division; Joachim Murat	None	2,898	General of Brigade; Pierre Champeaux †	9th Dragoon Regiment, 3 squadrons	150
Reserve Cavalry; General of Division; Joachim Murat	None	2,898	General of Brigade; Pierre Champeaux †	15th Horse Chasseur Regiment	249
Reserve Cavalry; General of Division; Joachim Murat	None	2,898	General of Brigade; Jean Rivaud (Not engaged)	12th Hussar Regiment, 4 squadrons	340
Reserve Cavalry; General of Division; Joachim Murat	None	2,898	General of Brigade; Jean Rivaud (Not engaged)	21st Horse Chasseur Regiment, 4 squadrons	360
Reserve; General of Division; Louis-Alexandre Berthier	Consular Guard	1,232	Colonel; Jérôme Soulès	Foot Grenadier Regiment	c. 400
Reserve; General of Division; Louis-Alexandre Berthier	Consular Guard	1,232	Colonel; Jérôme Soulès	Foot Chasseur Regiment	c. 400
Reserve; General of Division; Louis-Alexandre Berthier	Consular Guard	1,232	Colonel; Jean-Baptiste Bessières	Guard Horse Grenadiers	c. 240
Reserve; General of Division; Louis-Alexandre Berthier	Consular Guard	1,232	Colonel; Jean-Baptiste Bessières	Guard Horse Chasseurs	c. 120
Reserve; General of Division; Louis-Alexandre Berthier	Consular Guard	1,232	Artillery	Guard Artillery Company	2 8-pound cannons 1 howitzer, 72 men
Reserve; General of Division; Louis-Alexandre Berthier	Reserve Artillery; General of Brigade; Auguste de Marmont	421	None	Unknown	2 6-pound cannons 3 guns, caliber?
Reserve; General of Division; Louis-Alexandre Berthier	Military Engineers; General of Division; Armand Samuel de Marescot	269	None	Sappers	269
Grand Total	–	29,942	–	–	29,942, 33 guns

== Habsburg Army ==
=== General Staff ===
- Commander-in-chief: General der Kavallerie Michael von Melas
  - Chief of Staff: General-major Anton von Zach (POW)

=== Habsburg commanders ===
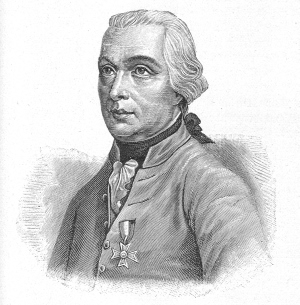
Michael von Melas

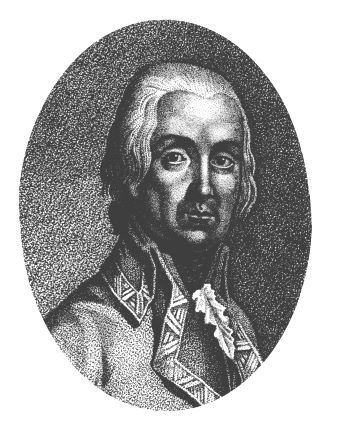
Anton von Zach

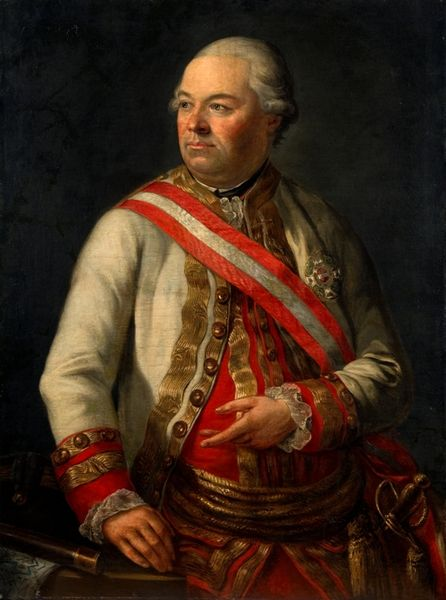
Karl Joseph Hadik

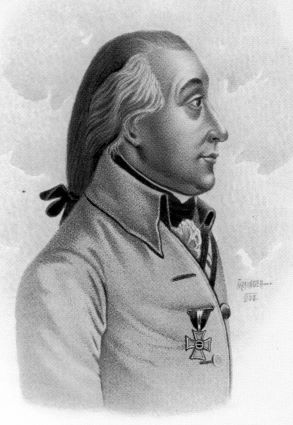
Peter Karl Ott

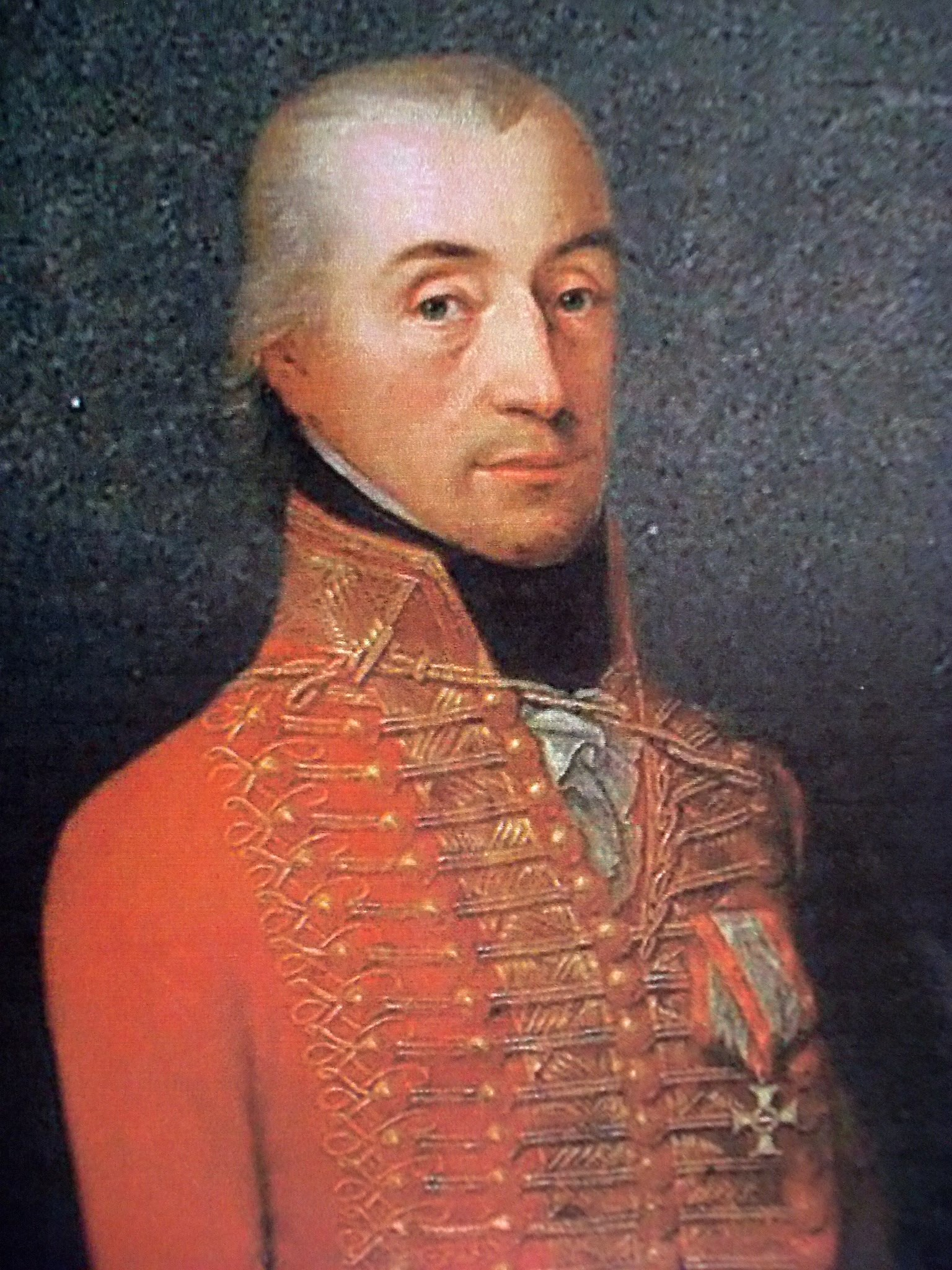
Vinko Knežević (Vincenz Knesevich)

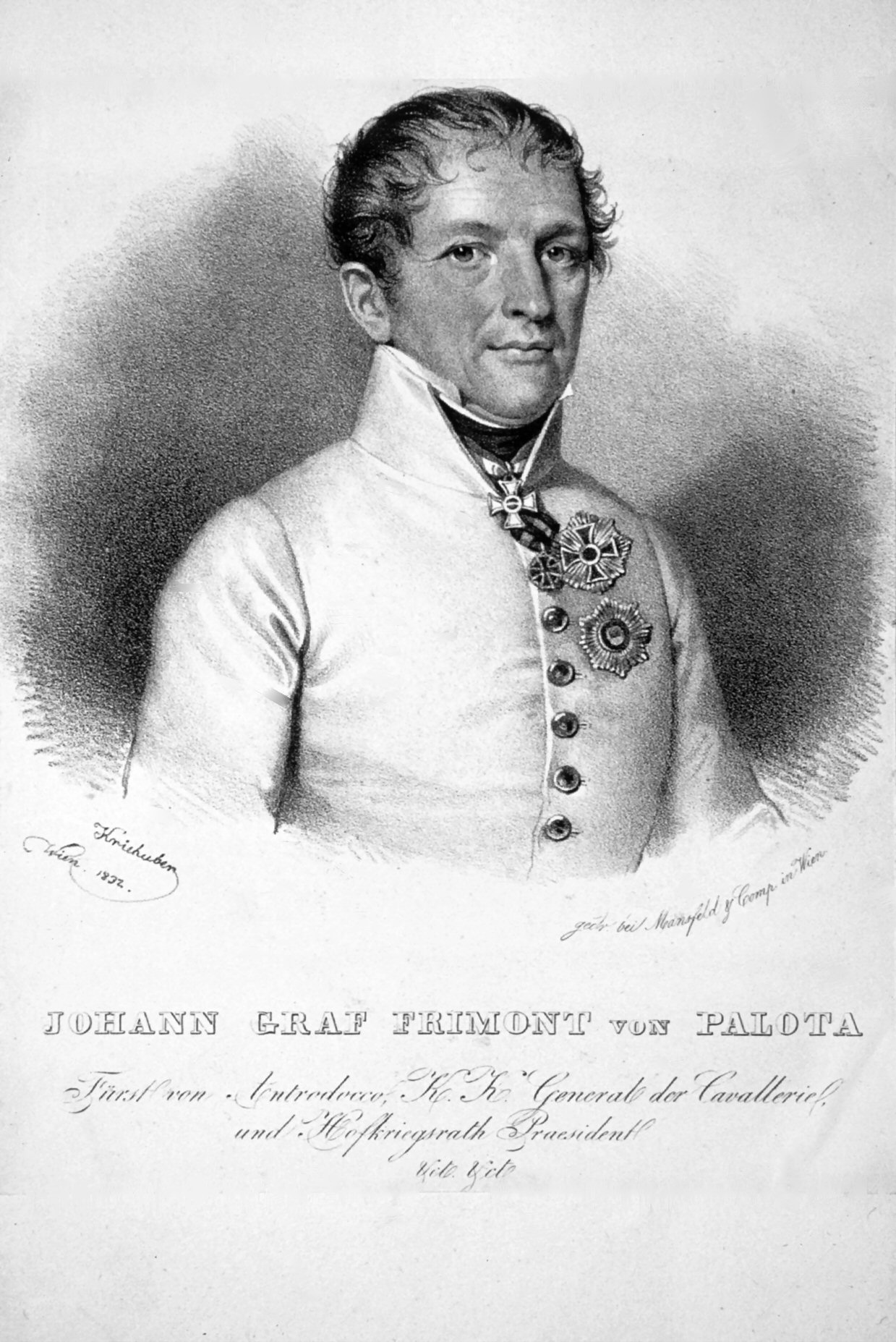
Johann Philipp Frimont

=== Organization ===
Michael von Melas' Austrian Army at Marengo
Wing	Division	Strength	Brigades	Units	Strength
Advance Guard	None	1,290	Oberst (Colonel); Johann Maria Philipp Frimont	Mariassy Jäger Battalion, 4 companies	164
Advance Guard	None	1,290	Oberst (Colonel); Johann Maria Philipp Frimont	Am Ende Light Battalion Nr. 3	291
Advance Guard	None	1,290	Oberst (Colonel); Johann Maria Philipp Frimont	Bach Light Battalion Nr. 4	277
Advance Guard	None	1,290	Oberst (Colonel); Johann Maria Philipp Frimont	Pioneers, 1 company	100
Advance Guard	None	1,290	Oberst (Colonel); Johann Maria Philipp Frimont	Kaiser Dragoon Regiment Nr. 1, 2 squadrons	272
Advance Guard	None	1,290	Oberst (Colonel); Johann Maria Philipp Frimont	Bussy Horse Jäger (French Émigré) Regiment, 2 squadrons	186
Advance Guard	None	1,290	Oberst (Colonel); Johann Maria Philipp Frimont	Cavalry Battery	–
Right Wing	Feldmarschall-Leutnant; Andreas O'Reilly von Ballinlough	2,997	General-major; Franz Rousseau d'Heriamont	Mariassy Jäger Battalion, 1 company	40
Right Wing	Feldmarschall-Leutnant; Andreas O'Reilly von Ballinlough	2,997	General-major; Franz Rousseau d'Heriamont	Ottocaner Grenz Infantry Regiment Nr. 2, 1 battalion	298
Right Wing	Feldmarschall-Leutnant; Andreas O'Reilly von Ballinlough	2,997	General-major; Franz Rousseau d'Heriamont	Oguliner Grenz Infantry Regiment Nr. 3, 1 battalion	602
Right Wing	Feldmarschall-Leutnant; Andreas O'Reilly von Ballinlough	2,997	General-major; Franz Rousseau d'Heriamont	Banater Grenz Infantry Regiment Nr. 4, 1 battalion	533
Right Wing	Feldmarschall-Leutnant; Andreas O'Reilly von Ballinlough	2,997	General-major; Franz Rousseau d'Heriamont	Warasdiner-Kreutzer Grenz Infantry Regiment Nr. 5, 1 battalion	755
Right Wing	Feldmarschall-Leutnant; Andreas O'Reilly von Ballinlough	2,997	General-major; Franz Rousseau d'Heriamont	Nauendorf Hussar Regiment Nr. 8, 3 1/3 squadrons	426
Right Wing	Feldmarschall-Leutnant; Andreas O'Reilly von Ballinlough	2,997	General-major; Franz Rousseau d'Heriamont	Hussar Regiment Nr. 5, 2 squadrons	230
Right Wing	Feldmarschall-Leutnant; Andreas O'Reilly von Ballinlough	2,997	General-major; Franz Rousseau d'Heriamont	Württemberg Dragoon Regiment Nr. 8, 1 squadron	113
Right Wing	Feldmarschall-Leutnant; Andreas O'Reilly von Ballinlough	2,997	General-major; Franz Rousseau d'Heriamont	Cavalry battery	–
Center; General der Kavallerie; Michael von Melas	Feldmarschall-Leutnant; Karl Joseph Hadik von Futak †	5,039	General-major; Franz (Giovanni) Pilati von Tassulo	Kaiser Dragoon Regiment Nr. 1, 3 squadrons	309
Center; General der Kavallerie; Michael von Melas	Feldmarschall-Leutnant; Karl Joseph Hadik von Futak †	5,039	General-major; Franz (Giovanni) Pilati von Tassulo	Karaczay Dragoon Regiment Nr. 4, 6 squadrons	1,053
Center; General der Kavallerie; Michael von Melas	Feldmarschall-Leutnant; Karl Joseph Hadik von Futak †	5,039	General-major; Friedrich Joseph Anton von Bellegarde (WIA)	Archduke Anton Infantry Regiment Nr. 52, 2 battalions	855
Center; General der Kavallerie; Michael von Melas	Feldmarschall-Leutnant; Karl Joseph Hadik von Futak †	5,039	General-major; Friedrich Joseph Anton von Bellegarde (WIA)	Johann Jellacic Infantry Regiment Nr. 53, 1 battalion	613
Center; General der Kavallerie; Michael von Melas	Feldmarschall-Leutnant; Karl Joseph Hadik von Futak †	5,039	General-major; Franz Xaver Saint-Julien	Michael Wallis Infantry Regiment Nr. 11, 3 battalions	2,209
Center; General der Kavallerie; Michael von Melas	Feldmarschall-Leutnant; Konrad Valentin von Kaim	4,939	General-major; Auguste-François Landres de Briey	Franz Kinsky Infantry Regiment Nr. 47, 2 1/3 battalions	1,640
Center; General der Kavallerie; Michael von Melas	Feldmarschall-Leutnant; Konrad Valentin von Kaim	4,939	General-major; Vinko Knežević (Vinzenz Knesevich)	Tuscany Infantry Regiment Nr. 23, 3 battalions	2,188
Center; General der Kavallerie; Michael von Melas	Feldmarschall-Leutnant; Konrad Valentin von Kaim	4,939	General-major; Ludwig Wolff de la Marselle (WIA)	Archduke Josef Infantry Regiment Nr. 63, 3 battalions	1,111
Center; General der Kavallerie; Michael von Melas	Feldmarschall-Leutnant; Anton von Elsnitz	4,214	General-major; Johann Baptist Nobili von Loptay	Archduke Johann Dragoon Regiment Nr. 3, 6 squadrons	859
Center; General der Kavallerie; Michael von Melas	Feldmarschall-Leutnant; Anton von Elsnitz	4,214	General-major; Johann Baptist Nobili von Loptay	Liechtenstein Dragoon Regiment Nr. 9, 6 squadrons	1,014
Center; General der Kavallerie; Michael von Melas	Feldmarschall-Leutnant; Anton von Elsnitz	4,214	General-major; Joseph Nimptsch von Fürst und Kupferberg (Not engaged)	Hussar Regiment Nr. 7, 8 squadrons	1,353
Center; General der Kavallerie; Michael von Melas	Feldmarschall-Leutnant; Anton von Elsnitz	4,214	General-major; Joseph Nimptsch von Fürst und Kupferberg (Not engaged)	Erdödy Hussar Regiment Nr. 9, 6 squadrons	988
Center; General der Kavallerie; Michael von Melas	Feldmarschall-Leutnant; Ferdinand Johann von Morzin (Note: Arnold did not list the grenadier battalions, other than to show Lattermann had five and Weidenfeld had six. Smith listed the battalions without noting which brigade they belonged to. However, the way they were ordered suggested that the lists in this table are probably accurate.)	4,756	General-major; Christoph von Lattermann (WIA)	Paar Grenadier battalion	2,116 (Note: This is the total strength of Lattermann's brigade.)
Center; General der Kavallerie; Michael von Melas	Feldmarschall-Leutnant; Ferdinand Johann von Morzin	4,756	General-major; Christoph von Lattermann (WIA)	Pers Grenadier battalion	–
Center; General der Kavallerie; Michael von Melas	Feldmarschall-Leutnant; Ferdinand Johann von Morzin	4,756	General-major; Christoph von Lattermann (WIA)	Sciaffinati Grenadier battalion	–
Center; General der Kavallerie; Michael von Melas	Feldmarschall-Leutnant; Ferdinand Johann von Morzin	4,756	General-major; Christoph von Lattermann (WIA)	Weber Grenadier battalion	–
Center; General der Kavallerie; Michael von Melas	Feldmarschall-Leutnant; Ferdinand Johann von Morzin	4,756	General-major; Christoph von Lattermann (WIA)	Czerwenka Grenadier battalion	–
Center; General der Kavallerie; Michael von Melas	Feldmarschall-Leutnant; Ferdinand Johann von Morzin	4,756	General-major; Karl Philippi von Weidenfeld	Pertusy Grenadier battalion	2,240 (Note: This is the total strength of Weidenfeld's brigade.)
Center; General der Kavallerie; Michael von Melas	Feldmarschall-Leutnant; Ferdinand Johann von Morzin	4,756	General-major; Karl Philippi von Weidenfeld	Piret Grenadier battalion	–
Center; General der Kavallerie; Michael von Melas	Feldmarschall-Leutnant; Ferdinand Johann von Morzin	4,756	General-major; Karl Philippi von Weidenfeld	Khevenhüller Grenadier battalion	–
Center; General der Kavallerie; Michael von Melas	Feldmarschall-Leutnant; Ferdinand Johann von Morzin	4,756	General-major; Karl Philippi von Weidenfeld	Gorschen Grenadier battalion	–
Center; General der Kavallerie; Michael von Melas	Feldmarschall-Leutnant; Ferdinand Johann von Morzin	4,756	General-major; Karl Philippi von Weidenfeld	Weissenwolf Grenadier battalion	–
Center; General der Kavallerie; Michael von Melas	Feldmarschall-Leutnant; Ferdinand Johann von Morzin	4,756	General-major; Karl Philippi von Weidenfeld	Saint-Julien Grenadier battalion	–
Center; General der Kavallerie; Michael von Melas	Feldmarschall-Leutnant; Ferdinand Johann von Morzin	4,756	Attached Pioneers	Pioneers, 4 companies	400
Left Wing; Feldmarschall-Leutnant; Peter Karl Ott von Bátorkéz	Advance Guard	811	General-major; Friedrich Heinrich von Gottesheim (WIA)	Mariassy Jäger Battalion, 1 company	40
Left Wing; Feldmarschall-Leutnant; Peter Karl Ott von Bátorkéz	Advance Guard	811	General-major; Friedrich Heinrich von Gottesheim (WIA)	Frölich Infantry Regiment Nr. 28, 1 battalion	523
Left Wing; Feldmarschall-Leutnant; Peter Karl Ott von Bátorkéz	Advance Guard	811	General-major; Friedrich Heinrich von Gottesheim (WIA)	Lobkowitz Dragoon Regiment Nr. 10, 2 squadrons	248
Left Wing; Feldmarschall-Leutnant; Peter Karl Ott von Bátorkéz	Feldmarschall-Leutnant; Ludwig von Vogelsang (WIA)	2,194	General-major; Josef Kajetan von Ulm zu Erbach	Hohenlohe Infantry Regiment Nr. 17, 2 battalions	912
Left Wing; Feldmarschall-Leutnant; Peter Karl Ott von Bátorkéz	Feldmarschall-Leutnant; Ludwig von Vogelsang (WIA)	2,194	General-major; Josef Kajetan von Ulm zu Erbach	Stuart Infantry Regiment Nr. 18, 3 battalions	1,282
Left Wing; Feldmarschall-Leutnant; Peter Karl Ott von Bátorkéz	Feldmarschall-Leutnant; Joseph von Schellenberg	4,597	General-major; Anton von Retz	Pioneers, 1 company	100
Left Wing; Feldmarschall-Leutnant; Peter Karl Ott von Bátorkéz	Feldmarschall-Leutnant; Joseph von Schellenberg	4,597	General-major; Anton von Retz	Frölich Infantry Regiment Nr. 28, 2 battalions	1,046
Left Wing; Feldmarschall-Leutnant; Peter Karl Ott von Bátorkéz	Feldmarschall-Leutnant; Joseph von Schellenberg	4,597	General-major; Anton von Retz	Joseph Mittrowsky Infantry Regiment Nr. 40, 3 battalions	853
Left Wing; Feldmarschall-Leutnant; Peter Karl Ott von Bátorkéz	Feldmarschall-Leutnant; Joseph von Schellenberg	4,597	General-major; Franz Seraph Sticker von Haymingthal	Splenyi Infantry Regiment Nr. 51, 2 battalions	737
Left Wing; Feldmarschall-Leutnant; Peter Karl Ott von Bátorkéz	Feldmarschall-Leutnant; Joseph von Schellenberg	4,597	General-major; Franz Seraph Sticker von Haymingthal	Josef Colloredo Infantry Regiment Nr. 57, 3 battalions)	1,369
Left Wing; Feldmarschall-Leutnant; Peter Karl Ott von Bátorkéz	Feldmarschall-Leutnant; Joseph von Schellenberg	4,597	General-major; Franz Seraph Sticker von Haymingthal	Lobkowitz Dragoon Regiment Nr. 10, 4 squadrons)	492
Grand Total	–	30,379	–	–	30,379; 92 guns (Note: Battalion guns are not counted in the total.)

== Notes ==
Footnotes

Citations
