= Battle of Montebello (1800) =

Battle Fought during the French Revolutionary War

- Part of the Marengo campaign within the War of the Second Coalition
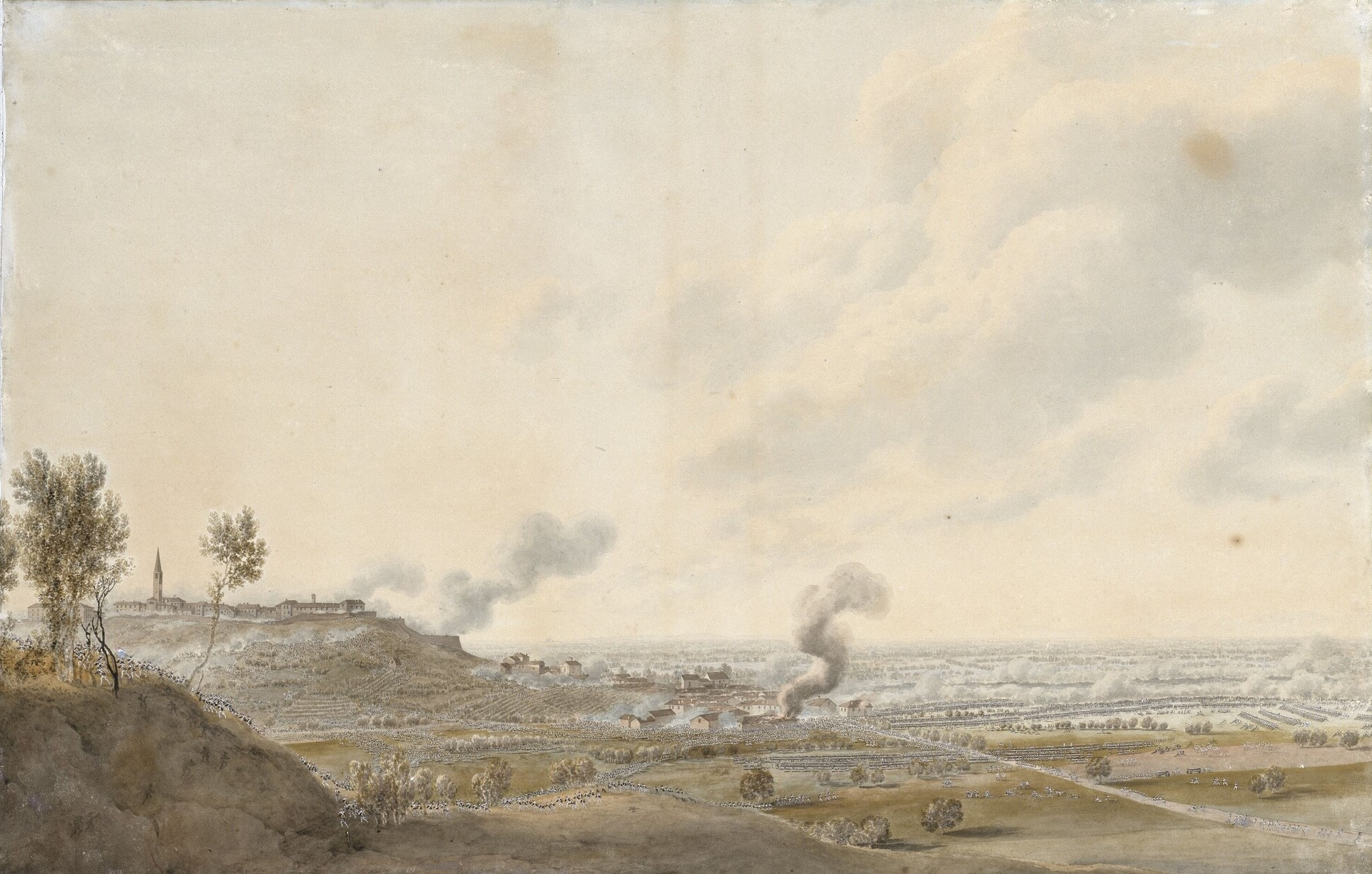
- First attack of the French at the Battle of Montebello in view of the town of Casteggio by Giuseppe Pietro Bagetti, 1806-1807
| Date | 9 June 1800 |
| Location | Near Montebello della Battaglia, Lombardy 45.0000°N 9.1000°E |
| Result | French victory |

Belligerents
| France | (Habsburg monarchy) Austria |

Commanders and leaders
| (France) Jean Lannes | (Habsburg monarchy) Peter Karl Ott |

Strength
| 8,000 rising to 14,000 | 18,000 |

Casualties and losses
| 600–3,000 | 659 killed 1,445 wounded 2,171 captured 2 cannons |

War of the Second Coalition:
Italy
current battle
Napoleon in command
Napoleon not in command

The Battle of Montebello (9 June 1800) was fought near Montebello in Lombardy between a French force under General of Division (GD) Jean Lannes and an Austrian force led by Feldmarschall-Leutnant (FML) Peter Karl Ott von Bátorkéz. The action occurred in the Marengo campaign during the War of the Second Coalition. During the lead-up to the Battle of Marengo, the vanguard of the French army in Italy engaged and defeated an Austrian force in a "glorious victory".

== Background ==
Napoleon Bonaparte's capture of Milan on 2 June found the Austrian army separated into three major and several minor concentrations. General der Kavallerie Michael von Melas held Turin with 18,000 men, FML Peter Ott's 16,000 troops remained near Genoa where they secured the surrender of GD André Masséna's starving garrison on 4 June, and FML Anton von Elsnitz with 8,000 soldiers retreated from the Riviera. To the east of Milan, FML Josef Philipp Vukassovich had 4,000 men. South of the Po River, FML Andreas O'Reilly von Ballinlough marched east toward Piacenza with 3,000 men. Strong garrisons manned the fortresses of Alessandria, Cuneo, and Casale. Melas believed he had plenty of time to mass his army and launch a counter-offensive north from Piacenza.

Lannes moved south from Milan with the army's vanguard, seizing Pavia on 3 June and being initially repulsed by Piacenza's tiny 400-man garrison. In a series of operations on 6 June, GD Joachim Murat and GD Jean Boudet ferried their troops across the Po to the east of Piacenza while Lannes crossed the Po to the west of the city. Murat then overran Piacenza while Lannes pushed O'Reilly back to the west. These actions placed French forces directly on the main Austrian line of communication between Alessandria and Mantua in the strategic Stradella defile. Meanwhile, Murat captured a set of Austrian dispatches that disclosed that Genoa had fallen. Confronted with a new situation, Napoleon issued orders to press the Austrians.

On 7 June, Ott's column was marching north from Genoa. Ott's corps reached Voghera at 8 pm on 8 June to join O'Reilly. A patrol reported French troops to the east. Ott directed O'Reilly with six infantry battalions and four cavalry squadrons to defend the village of Casteggio on the main east-west highway.

Meanwhile, the French army became overextended. Believing that his enemies could not be in strength, Napoleon sent a note to Lannes, "If troops should present themselves between Voghera and Stradella let them be attacked without caution; they are, certainly, fewer than 10,000 men." Lannes planned to continue marching west. This would bring his 8,000 men into contact with Ott's corps of 18,000.

== Forces ==
French Forces: Jean Lannes
Corps: Lannes (8,000)

- Division: François Watrin
  - 6th Demi-brigade Légère
  - 22nd Demi-brigade de Ligne
  - 40th Demi-brigade de Ligne
- Advance Guard: Joseph Antoine Marie Michel Mainoni
  - 28th Demi-brigade de Ligne
- Attached units:
  - 12th Hussars, 2 batteries, Consular Guard artillery

Corps: Claude Victor-Perrin (6,000)

- Division: Jacques Chambarlhac
  - 24th Demi-brigade Légère
  - 43rd Line Demi-brigade de Ligne
  - 96th Line Demi-brigade de Ligne

Austrian Forces: Peter Karl Ott

- Division commanders: Ludwig von Vogelsang, Joseph von Schellenberg, Andreas O'Reilly
  - Reisky Infantry Regiment (IR) No. 13 (3 battalions)
  - Stuart IR No. 18 (3 bns)
  - Splenyi IR No. 51 (3 bns)
  - Jellacic IR No. 53 (3 bns)
  - Josef Colloredo IR No. 57 (3 bns)
  - Ottocaner Grenz IR No. 2 (1 bn)
  - Oguliner Grenz IR No. 3 (2 bns)
  - Lobkowitz Dragoons No. 10
  - Nauendorf Hussars No. 8
  - Archduke Josef Hussars No. 2

== Battle ==
On the morning of 9 June, the 6th Light Infantry Demi-brigade belonging to General of Division François Watrin bumped into an Austrian position and immediately attacked. Melas' chief-of-staff, General-Major Anton von Zach was on the scene and he advised Ott against bringing on a battle. Ott overruled him. Watrin aggressively fed his units into the battle, but found his three demi-brigades, two batteries and one cavalry regiment opposed by a superior force. Ott disposed of 26 infantry battalions and 15 cavalry squadrons, but his 35 cannons caused the French the worst trouble.

For five hours, the outnumbered French soldiers tried to break the Austrian position. Twice they seized Casteggio, but were driven out by O'Reilly's troops. Attempts to flank the Austrian left were repulsed by the Lobkowitz Dragoons and an artillery battery. The 12th Hussars charged repeatedly to keep the French infantry from being overrun by the Austrian dragoons. Nine Austrian battalions defended a hill to the south of the village while, a short distance to the west, five battalions waited in reserve in the village of Montebello. The French received some help when the Consular Guard's three field pieces and other units arrived.

As Lannes' command neared their breaking point at about 1:00 pm, General of Division Jacques-Antoine de Chambarlhac de Laubespin's division of Claude Perrin Victor's corps arrived on the scene. Victor sent the 43rd Line under General of Brigade Olivier Macoux Rivaud de la Raffinière to attack the enemy right, the 24th Light to assault the Austrian left and the 96th Line to charge the center. Despite intense Austrian artillery fire, the combined pressure forced back Ott's tired soldiers and convinced that general to order a phased withdrawal. O'Reilly's battalions held Casteggio to the last and the Reisky Regiment was nearly wiped out. O'Reilly's survivors and the numerous Austrian cavalry covered the retreat.

== Result ==
The Austrians reported losing 659 killed, 1,445 wounded and 2,171 captured, as well as two field pieces lost. The French claimed only 600 casualties, but a more realistic assessment is that they suffered about 3,000 losses. "Yet the Battle of Montebello did not fatally compromise Melas' situation. His strategy to mass his forces and then attack remained sound." On the other hand, "Austrian morale suffered a serious relapse, and Melas remained as if hypnotized around Alessandria for the next five days without making any significant move, waiting for his troops to complete their concentration." The next engagement would be the decisive Battle of Marengo on 14 June.

Jean Lannes distinguished himself at this battle, for which he was awarded the victory title of duc de Montebello in 1808.

== Footnotes ==
| Preceded by Battle of Biberach (1800) | French Revolution: Revolutionary campaigns Battle of Montebello | Succeeded by Battle of Marengo |
