= Battle of Marengo =

Part of the War of the Second Coalition (1800)

- Part of the Marengo campaign in the War of the Second Coalition
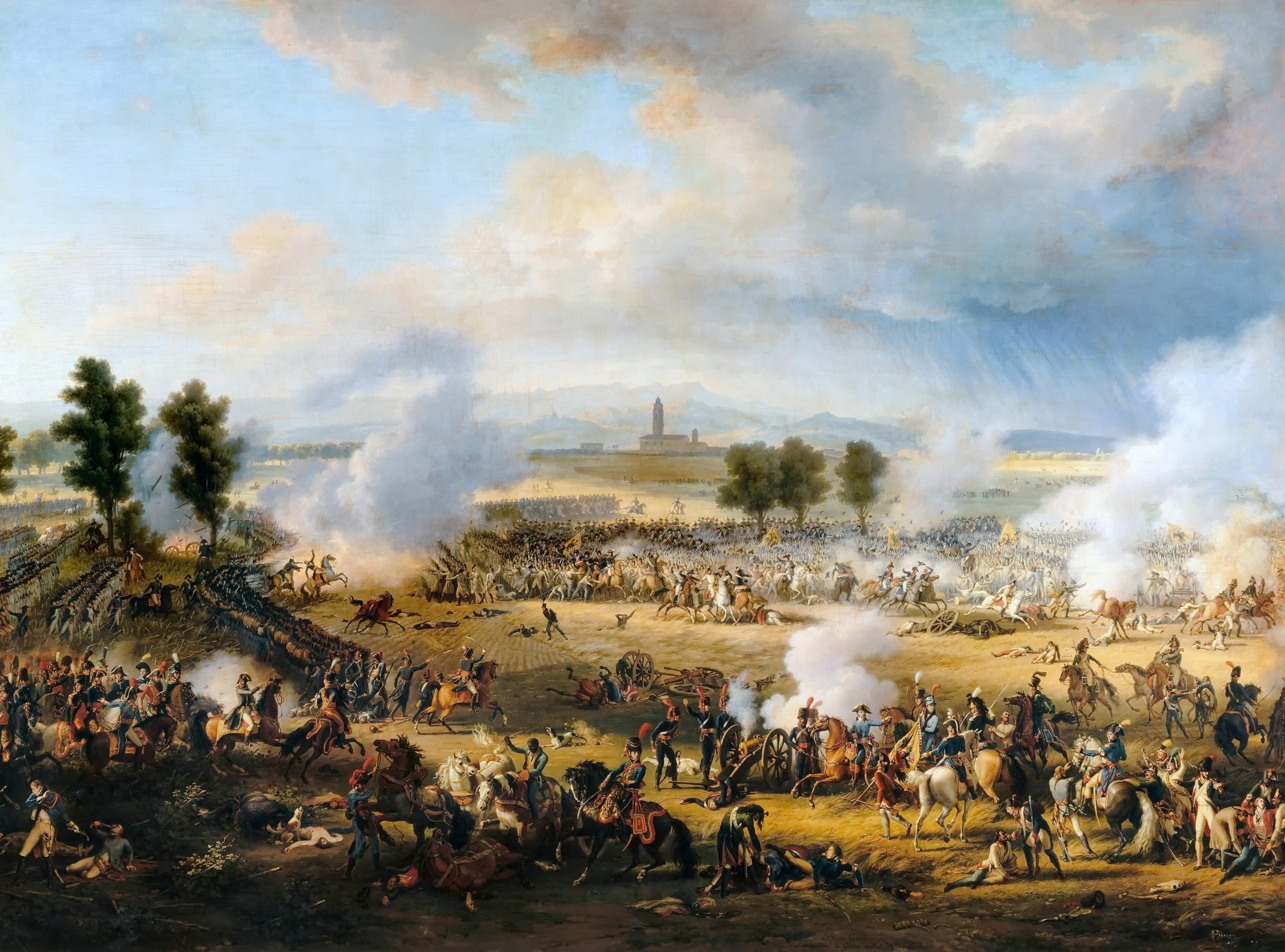
- The Battle of Marengo; Louis-François Lejeune, 1801
| Date | 14 June 1800 |
| Location | Spinetta Marengo, Alessandria, Piedmont 44°53′8″N 8°40′39″E |
| Result | French victory |

Belligerents
| France | Austria |

Commanders and leaders
| Napoleon Bonaparte; Louis Desaix †; Louis Berthier; Jean Lannes; Claude Victor; François Kellermann | Michael Melas (WIA); Peter Karl Ott; Anton Zach (POW); Konrad Kaim; Karl Hadik (DOW); Anton von Elsnitz |

Strength
| Originally: 22,000 men, 15 cannon Total: 28,000 men | 30,000 men, 100 cannon |

Casualties and losses
| between 5,600 and approx. 7,000, with at least: 1,100 killed 3,600 wounded 900 captured | 6,000 killed or wounded 8,000 captured 40 cannons Modern sources: 9,402 total 963 killed 5,518 wounded 2,921 captured 13 cannons |
- Location within Europe

War of the Second Coalition:
Italy
current battle
Napoleon in command
Napoleon not in command

The Battle of Marengo was fought on 14 June 1800 between French forces under the First Consul Napoleon Bonaparte and Austrian forces near the city of Alessandria, in Piedmont, Italy. Near the end of the day, the French overcame General Michael von Melas's surprise attack, drove the Austrians out of Italy and consolidated Bonaparte's political position in Paris as First Consul of France in the wake of his coup d'état the previous November.

Surprised by the Austrian advance toward Genoa in mid-April 1800, Bonaparte led his army over the Alps in mid-May and reached Milan on 2 June. After cutting Melas's line of communications by crossing the river Po and defeating Feldmarschallleutnant (FML) Peter Karl Ott von Bátorkéz at Montebello on 9 June, the French closed in on the Austrian Army, which had massed in Alessandria. Deceived by a local double agent, Bonaparte dispatched large forces to the north and the south, but the Austrians launched a surprise attack on 14 June against the main French army, under General Louis Alexandre Berthier.

Initially, their two assaults across the Fontanone stream near Marengo village were repelled, and General Jean Lannes reinforced the French right. Bonaparte realized the true position and issued orders at 11:00 am to recall the detachment under Général de Division (GdD) Louis Desaix while he moved his reserve forward. On the Austrian left, Ott's column had taken Castel Ceriolo, and its advance guard moved south to attack Lannes' flank. Melas renewed the main assault, and the Austrians broke the central French position. By 2:30 pm, the French were withdrawing, and Austrian dragoons seized the Marengo farm. Bonaparte had by then arrived with the reserve, but Berthier's troops began to fall back on the main vine belts. Knowing that Desaix was approaching, Bonaparte was anxious about a column of Ott's soldiers marching from the north and so he deployed his Consular Guard infantry to delay it. The French then withdrew steadily eastward toward San Giuliano Vecchio as the Austrians formed a column to follow them, as Ott also advanced in the northern sector.

Desaix's arrival at around 5:30 pm stabilized the French position, as the 9th Light Infantry Regiment delayed the Austrian advance down the main road and the rest of the army reformed north of Cascina Grossa. As the pursuing Austrian troops arrived, a mix of musketry and artillery fire concealed the surprise attack of Général de Brigade (GdB) François Étienne de Kellermann's cavalry, which threw the Austrian pursuit into disordered flight back into Alessandria, with about 14,000 killed, wounded or captured. The French casualties were considerably fewer but included Desaix. The whole French line chased after the Austrians to seal une victoire politique (a political victory) that secured Bonaparte's grip on power after the coup. It would be followed by a propaganda campaign that sought to rewrite the story of the battle three times during his rule.

== Background ==
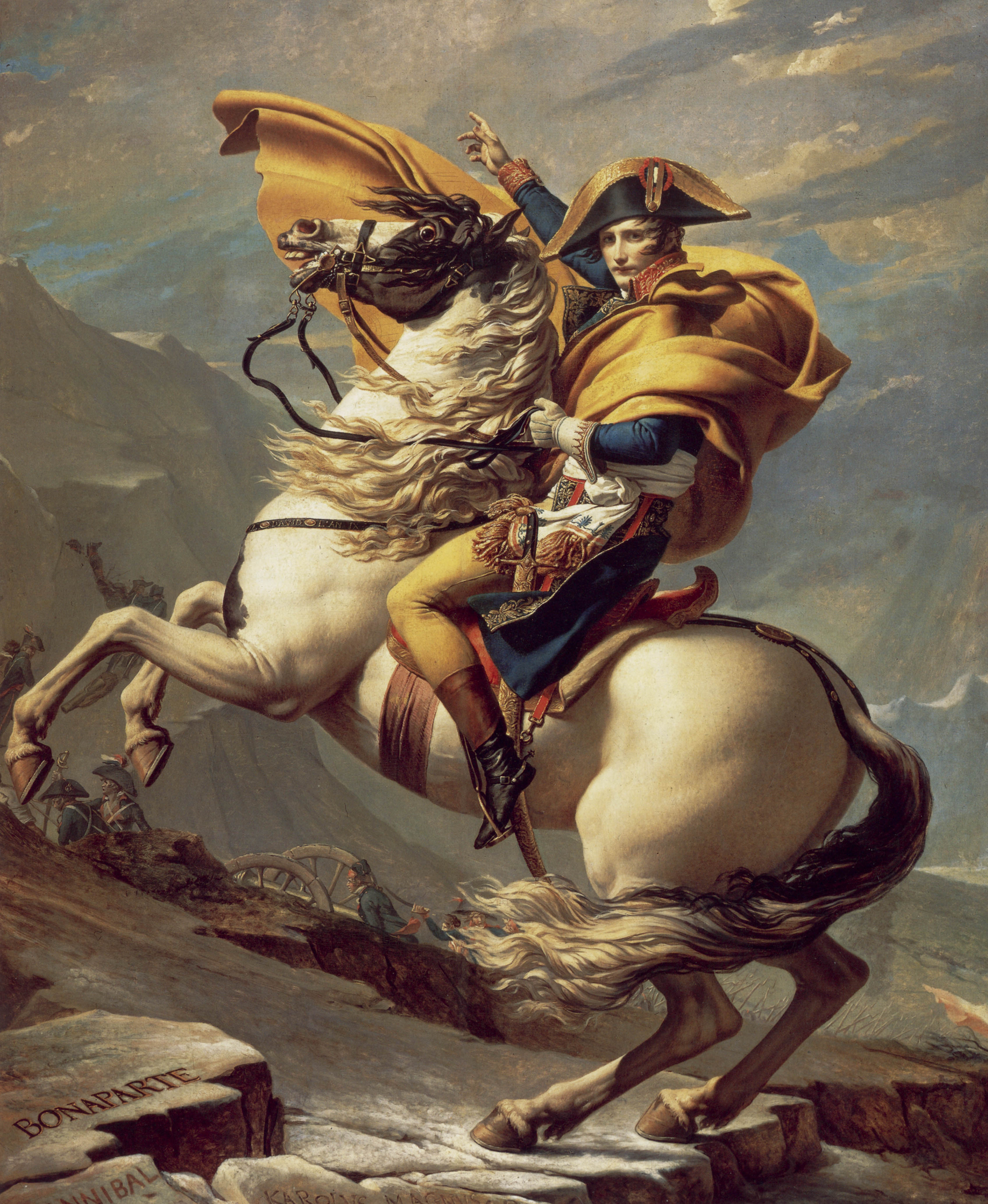
Napoleon Crossing the Alps by Jacques-Louis David

The Battle of Marengo was the victory that sealed the success of Bonaparte's Italian campaign of 1800 and is best understood in the context of that campaign. By a daring crossing of the Alps with his Army of the Reserve (officially commanded by Louis Alexandre Berthier) in mid-May 1800 almost before the passes were open, Bonaparte (who crossed on a mule) had threatened Melas' lines of communications in northern Italy. The French army then seized Milan on 2 June, followed by Pavia, Piacenza and Stradella, Lombardy, cutting the main Austrian supply route eastward along the south bank of the Po. Bonaparte hoped that Melas' preoccupation with the Siege of Genoa, held by Gen. André Masséna, would prevent the Austrians from responding to his offensive. However, Genoa surrendered on 4 June, freeing a large number of Austrians for operations against the French.

On 9 June Gen. Jean Lannes beat Feldmarschallleutnant Peter Ott in the Battle of Montebello. This caused Bonaparte to become overconfident. He became convinced that Melas would not attack and, further, that the Austrians were about to retreat. As other French forces closed from the west and south, the Austrian commander had withdrawn most of his troops from their positions near Nice and Genoa to Alessandria on the main Turin-Mantua road.

=== Austrian plans and preliminary French moves ===
The Austrians planned to fight their way out eastward but—using a local double agent, usually known by his cover of François Toli—attempted to deceive Bonaparte into thinking they would try to march north, cross the Po and head for Milan, joined by the remaining troops marching up from Genoa. The spy would advise Bonaparte to march via Sale on the northern side of the plain, so that he could be engaged by the Austrian left wing; meanwhile the main force would move through Marengo village in the centre, turn north and fall into the French left flank. Ott arrived from Montebello of 13 June in a war council. The senior generals of the Austrian army strongly approved this plan, as the alternative would have meant that the army would have had to retreat along the river Po and leave Piedmont to the enemy without a fight. Nonetheless, by abandoning the San Giuliano plain, where the superior Austrian cavalry could have given him an edge, Melas probably made a serious mistake.

Bonaparte knew that Ott had no way out from Alessandria, but he had no idea of Melas' position. Following his meeting with the spy and fearing that the Austrian general might try to escape, Bonaparte spread his army out in a wide net by sending Louis Desaix with Divisional General Jean Boudet's division (6,000 men) south to Novi Ligure and Divisional General Jean François Cornu de La Poype (3,500 men) north on the other bank of the Po. Further north, from Vercelli to Lake Maggiore, were stationed the divisions of Antoine de Béthencourt and Joseph Chabran and, further to the rear, north of Piacenza, Jean Thomas Guillaume Lorge's division. Bonaparte's view was confirmed when Gen. Claude Victor-Perrin, supported by Divisional General Joachim Murat's cavalry, swiftly evicted FML Andreas O'Reilly von Ballinlough's Austrian brigade from Marengo village that afternoon. Victor then deployed divisional generals Gaspard Amédée Gardanne and Jacques-Antoine de Chambarlhac de Laubespin's divisions along the Fontanone stream. Austrian headquarters debated building a bridge to the north to outflank the French, but the lack of pontoons and time forced the Austrians to cross the river Bormida and then launch a single, direct assault across the Fontanone bridge.

== Prelude ==
=== Battlefield ===
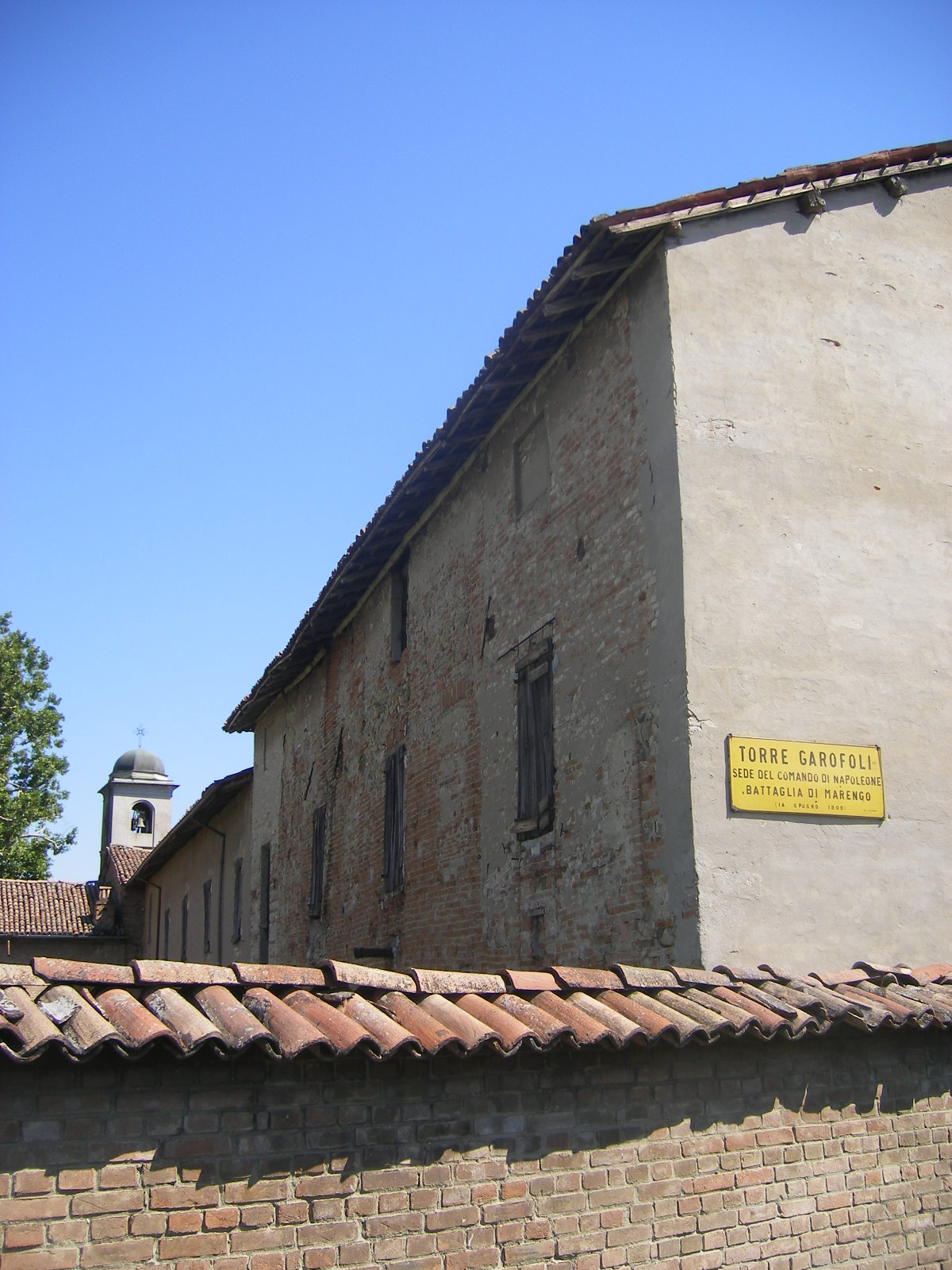
Torre Garofoli, Napoleon's headquarters before the battle

The battle took place to the east of Alessandria, on a plain crossed by a river forming meanders, the Bormida, over which the Austrians installed a bridgehead. On the plain were spread numerous hamlets and farms that represented strategic points. The three main sites of the battle formed a triangle, with Marengo in the west, Castel Ceriolo in the north and San Giuliano Vecchio in the east. A small stream, the Fontanone, passed between Marengo and the Bormida. The First Consul had established his headquarters at Torre Garofoli, which was further to the east. This headquarters, nowadays visitable, is situated in the street: "Strada Comunale Cerca" coordinates N44°53'37.01 E 8°48'14.12

=== Forces ===
The 30,000 Austrians and their 100 guns were initially opposed by 22,000 French and their 15 guns. Meanwhile, after the arrival of Desaix, 6,000 men would reinforce Bonaparte's army.

The 1799 campaign had exhausted the Austrian army in Italy, casualties and disease reducing some regiments to 300 men. The largest component of the army was in Piedmont and the neighbouring Po valley; only a few units were moved to winter quarters in better-supplied areas. Long distances from the home bases, from which the regiments drew reinforcements, meant that troop transports had to endure miserable conditions, so only about 15% reached the field army. The army of March 1800 was scarcely larger than at the conclusion of the 1799 campaign. Equipment and uniforms were improved and updated. Although a simpler uniform, with a leather helmet and smaller-caliber muskets, was introduced, little had reached the field armies by 1800. Efforts were made to standardize equipment, but many units used a variety of musket and saber patterns. Melas split his army into three corps facing the Bormida, in front of Alessandria. In the north Ott commanded Friedrich Heinrich von Gottesheim's advance guard plus Joseph von Schellenberg and Ludwig von Vogelsang's divisions. In the south was Feldmarschallleutnant Andreas O'Reilly von Ballinlough's division. Melas himself took control of the center, with the divisions of Karl Joseph Hadik von Futak, Konrad Valentin von Kaim, Ferdinand Johann von Morzin and Anton von Elsnitz.

In 1799 the 36,000 French troops in Italy were in a desperate state similar to that at the end of 1795. Supplies of all sorts were inadequate, discipline was breaking down, desertion was increasing and, on a few occasions, whole formations marched to the rear in search of food. The survivors would be of limited combat value. In establishing the Army of the Reserve in France, Bonaparte's first move was to overhaul the supply system to provide the troops with regular food and decent uniforms. Lacking the large superiority in infantry and artillery enjoyed in many Republican campaigns, the core of Bonaparte's reserve was 30,000 men, mostly from the Batavian Republic, who had been used under Guillaume Marie Anne Brune to crush the rebellion in the Vendée. Additional veteran troops came from the remains of the former Army of England. The new military doctrine emphasised the offensive, mobility and the bayonet over linear firepower. In front of the Austrian army were stationed, in and to the south of Marengo, the corps of Victor (Jacques-Antoine de Chambarlhac de Laubespin and Gaspard Amédée Gardanne's divisions), supported on the left by François Étienne de Kellermann's cavalry and, further to the northeast, by the corps of Lannes (François Watrin's division, Mainoni's brigade) together with two cavalry brigades. To the east of Castel Ceriolo took position Jean-Charles Monnier's division, supported by the Guard, which formed the reserve. Victor was the one who would bear the brunt of the Austrian attack.

== Battle ==
=== Austrian attack ===
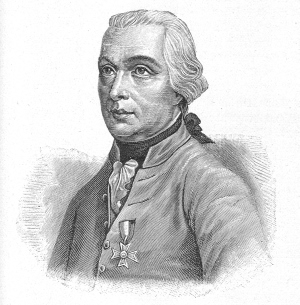
Michael von Melas led the centre of the army during the attack, but he mistakenly believed that the battle was over before the arrival of Desaix.

The Austrian troops advanced from Alessandria eastwards across the river Bormida by two bridges debouching in a narrow bend of the river (the river being not easily crossed elsewhere). Poor Austrian staff work prevented any rapid development of their attack and the entire army had to file through a narrow bridgehead. The movement began about 6 am with the first shots fired around 8 am, but the attack was not fully developed until 9 am.

The 1,200-man Austrian advance guard under Colonel (Oberst) Johann Maria Philipp Frimont, and a division of 3,300 men under FML O'Reilly, pushed the French outposts back and deployed to become the Austrian right wing, driving the enemy from Pedrabona farm, then heading south to tackle the French at La Stortiglione farm. The Austrian centre (about 18,000 under Melas) advanced towards Marengo until halted by GdD Gardanne's French infantry deployed in front of the Fontanone stream. On the Austrian left, 7,500 men under FML Peter Ott waited for the road to clear before heading for the village of Castel Ceriolo well to the north of the French positions. This move threatened either an envelopment of the French right, or a further advance to cut the French line of communication with Milan.

Gardanne's men gave a good account of themselves, holding up the Austrian deployment for a considerable time. When Gardanne's division was exhausted, Victor pulled it back behind the Fontanone and committed his second division under GdD Chambarlhac (this officer soon lost his nerve and fled). The French held Marengo village and the line of the Fontanone until about noon, with both flanks in the air. First, at 8 am, Melas hurled FML Karl Joseph Hadik von Futak's division (four battalions) at Victor's defenses, supported by Frimont's advance guard battery along the stream. Forced into a funnel by the bad ground and Fontanone stream, Hadik's attack came under fire from two sides and failed, with Hadik being killed. The Austrian commander then committed FML Konrad Valentin von Kaim's division but this attack was also thwarted by 11 am. Finally, as the French position was reinforced by François Étienne de Kellermann's cavalry and Jean Lannes's formation was on the way, FML Ferdinand Johann von Morzin's elite grenadier division was sent in to attack Marengo village. Melas also committed a serious tactical blunder, detaching Generalmajor (GM) Nimptsch's brigade of 2,300 hussars and two artillery batteries back over the Bormida bridge to block the corps of General Louis Gabriel Suchet, which was mistakenly reported around 9 am from Acqui Terme to be approaching Alessandria from the south. Besides delaying the crossing of the Austrian left wing, this also meant that, being 30 kilometers away, Nimptsch's brigade would play no part in the battle.

==== Stalemate in the centre around Marengo ====
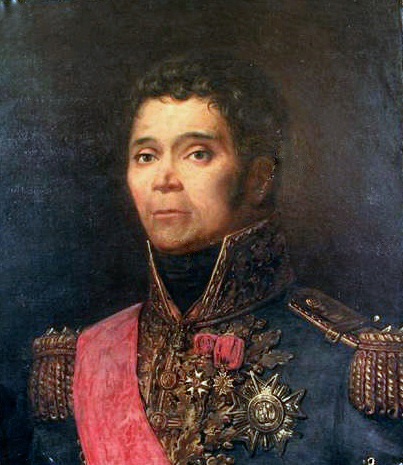
François Étienne de Kellermann played an important role during the battle.

It took Bonaparte (5 kilometers away from Marengo) until about 10 am to recognize that the Austrian activity was not a diversionary attack to cover the anticipated retreat by Melas. His subordinates had brought their troops up in support of Victor's corps. Lannes's corps had deployed on the crucial right flank. GM Friedrich Joseph Anton von Bellegarde's part of Kaim's division had crossed the Fontanone north of Marengo and occupied La Barbotta farm. Lannes directed Watrin's infantry to drive Bellegarde back. They briefly crossed the Fontanone before Austrian reserve guns drove the French back. Kellermann's heavy cavalry brigade and the 8th Dragoons took up a covering position on the left, smashing an attempt by GM Giovanni Pilatti's light dragoon brigade which attempted to cross the steep-sided Fontanone at its southern end to envelop Victor's flank. On the right, GdB Pierre Champeaux was killed trying to stop the progress of Ott's column. A small part of the 6^{ème} Légère (6th Light Infantry Regiment) occupied Castel Ceriolo to the north, but soon Ott's lead units took it around 11:30 am and began putting pressure on the French right flank. Ott could not see any sign of the expected main French advance from Sale (to the northeast), so he sent GM Friedrich Heinrich von Gottesheim's reinforced advance guard to outflank Lannes north of Marengo. By 11 am Bonaparte was on the battlefield. He sent urgent recalls to his recently detached forces and summoned up his last reserves. As they came up, GdD Jean-Charles Monnier's division and the Consular Guard were committed to extend and shore up the French right, rather than to try to hold Marengo where Victor's men were running short of ammunition.

==== Austrian breakout across the Fontanone ====
Toward 12:30 pm Lannes moved the rest of his force to face Gottesheim in a hook shape, while Kaim attacked again, but this time against Victor's wings. A Laufbrücke (small bridge) was thrown over the Fontanone and supported by reserve artillery. GM Christoph von Lattermann's grenadiers crossed to engage Olivier Macoux Rivaud de la Raffinière's two demibrigades defending Marengo village, while Bellegarde and Frimont's four squadrons split Watrin off. Although Rivaud retook the village, O’Reilly had taken Stortiglione by 2:00 pm, and in the north, Ott prepared to send FML Joseph von Schellenberg's column to support Gottesheim. After securing the Fontanone bridge, Pilatti's cavalry crossed but were again charged and defeated by Kellermann. However, Victor could no longer hold his positions and withdrew southeast to the main vine belt (grape vines slung among mulberry trees), Lannes mirroring the move. The Marengo farm garrison was abandoned and at around 2:30 pm Melas led two cavalry squadrons to capture them.

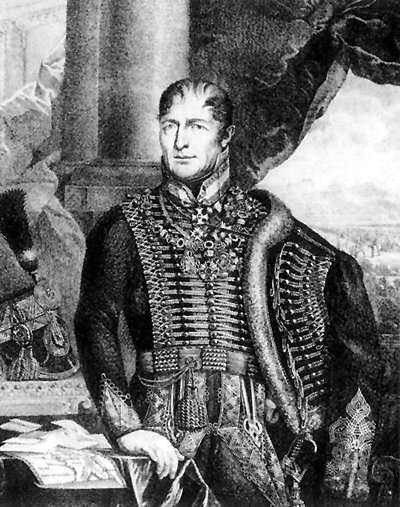
Johann Frimont's troops destroyed the Consular Guard infantry.

At about 2:00 pm the French attacked Castel Ceriolo and delayed the advance of Schellenberg's column by attacking its tail. Aided by Frimont, Ott defeated Monnier and forced two-thirds of his command to retreat to the northeast. About the same time, Marengo had fallen to the Austrians, forcing Napoleon's men into a general retreat. As Austrian troops crossed the Fontanone, their guns bombarded the French infantry in the vines. In a bid to further delay Schellenberg's advance, Bonaparte committed his main Guard battalion and its artillery, which moved to flank the column. After driving off Austrian dragoons with the aid of GdB Champeaux's remaining cavalry (under Joachim Murat), they engaged the head of the column. After a 15-minute firefight around 4:00 pm the Guard were surprised and destroyed by Frimont's cavalry.

The French fell back c. 3 km and attempted to regroup to hold the village of San Giuliano. With the French outnumbered and driven from their best defensive position, the battle was as good as won by the Austrians. Melas, who was slightly wounded, and 71, handed over command to his chief of staff, General Anton von Zach, and Kaim. The Austrian centre formed into a massive pursuit column in order to chase the French off the battlefield, with the advance guard commanded by GM Franz Xaver Saint-Julien. The column formed up around Spinetta, southeast of Marengo, and advanced down the New Road. However, delays in the flanks led to the Austrian army forming a crescent shape with a thinly stretched central sector. On the Austrian right wing, O'Reilly wasted time hunting down a 300-man French detachment led by Achille Dampierre (which was finally captured) and moved southeast. This took his troops out of supporting distance from the Austrian main body. On the Austrian left, Ott hesitated to press hard against the French because GdB Jean Rivaud's small brigade of French cavalry hovered to the north.

=== French counter-attack ===
However, Desaix, in charge of the force Bonaparte had detached southwards, had hastened his advance and reached a small road junction north of Cascina Grossa (3 km west of San Giuliano). Shortly before 5:00 pm, he reported to Bonaparte in person with the news that his force (6,000 men and 9 guns of Boudet's division) was not far behind. The story goes that, asked by Bonaparte what he thought of the situation, Desaix replied: "This battle is completely lost. However, there is time to win another."

The French were fast to bring up and deploy the fresh troops in front of San Giuliano, and the Austrians were slow to mount their attack. Boudet and the 9^{ème} Légère (9th Light Infantry Regiment) were quickly moved on to the exit from the main vine belt, where they surprised the head of Saint-Julien's column. As the Austrian infantry deployed on the south side of the road, the 9^{ème} Légère conducted a steady withdrawal for 30 minutes back to Desaix's position. There he had placed GdB Louis Charles de Guénand's brigade on the north side while most of the remaining French army (Monnier and Lannes) were forming up north from there. The Austrians deployed three artillery batteries on the north side of the road supported by a dragoon regiment. GdB Auguste de Marmont massed the remaining French cannon against the Austrians as they advanced. Boudet's division advanced in line of brigades against the head of the Austrian column, defeating Saint-Julien's leading Austrian brigade. Zach brought forward GM Lattermann's grenadier brigade in line and renewed the attack. Faced with a crisis, Napoleon sent Desaix forward again and ordered a cavalry charge requested by Desaix. The 9^{ème} Légère halted to face the main Austrian advance and Marmont's guns blasted the Austrians with grapeshot at close range. Further back, an Austrian ammunition limber exploded. In the temporary heightening of confusion, Lattermann's formation was charged on its left flank by Kellermann's heavy cavalry (ca. 400 men) and disintegrated. At the decisive moment of the battle, Desaix was shot from his horse. Zach and at least 2,000 of his men were taken prisoners.

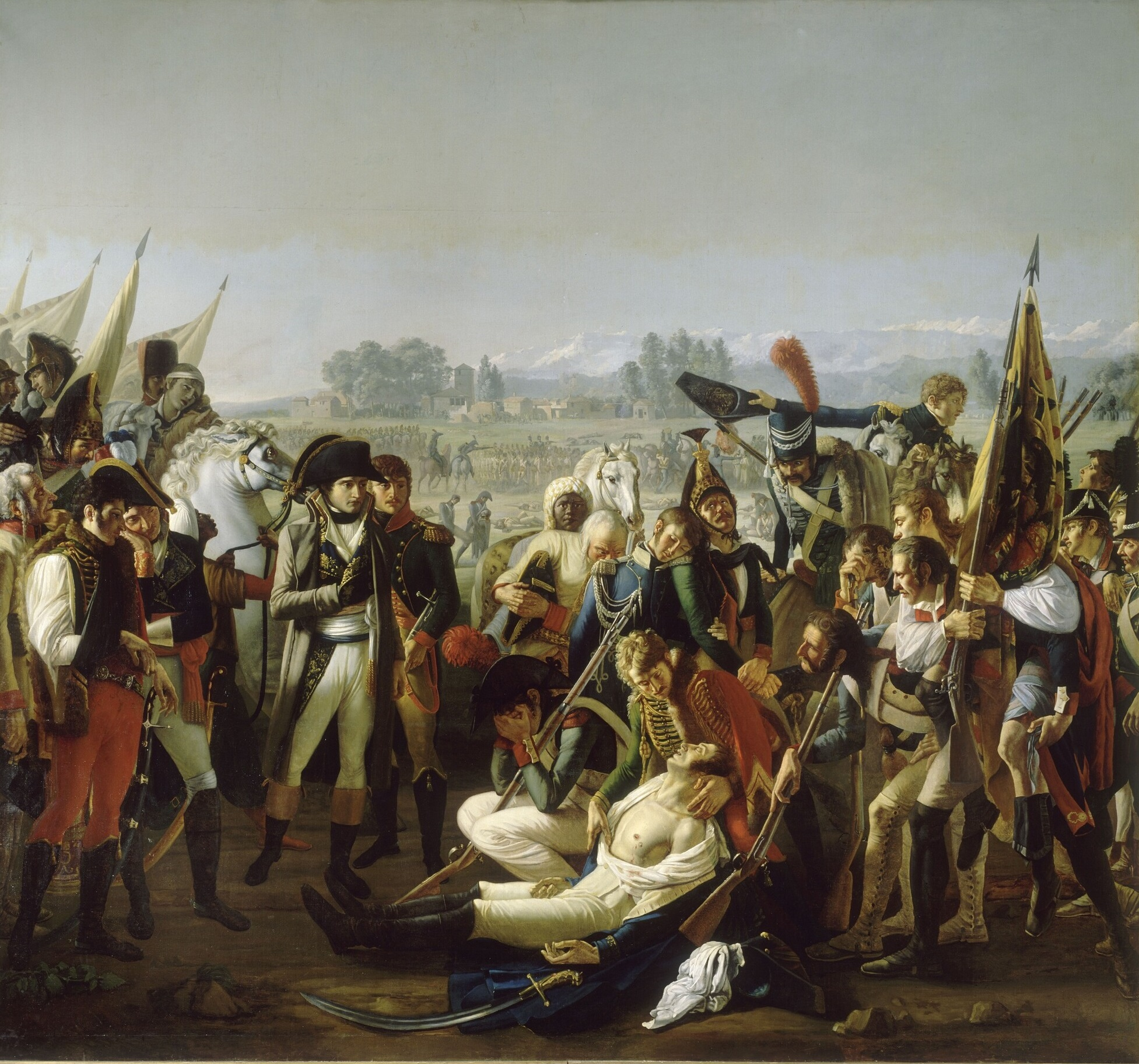
The Death of General Desaix by Jean Broc, 1806

Murat and Kellermann immediately pounced on the supporting Liechtenstein Dragoons who were too slow to respond and routed them as well. The fleeing Austrian horsemen crashed into the ranks of Pilatti's rattled troopers and carried them away. As the mob of terrified cavalry stampeded past them, the exhausted Austrian infantry of the main body lost heart, provoking a wild rush to the rear. The gun teams fled, pursued by French cavalry, while the whole French infantry line advanced westward. The second grenadier brigade under GM Karl Philippi von Weidenfeld and some unpanicked cavalry delayed Boudet's advance long enough for O’Reilly's cavalry to return, and together with Frimont, they mounted a last defense around Marengo village as night fell, allowing the Austrian centre to reach safety behind the Bormida. Ott with the Austrian left failed to intervene and found his retreat through Castel Ceriolo blocked by French troops advancing northwest from the centre, but managed to fight his way back to the Bormida bridgehead.

The Austrians fell back into Alessandria, having lost about half the forces they had committed. The Austrians had lost heavily in the 12 hours of fighting: 15 colours, 40 guns, almost 8,000 taken prisoner, and 6,500 dead or wounded. French casualties (killed and wounded) were on the order of 4,700 and 900 missing or captured, but they retained the battlefield and the strategic initiative. Desaix's body was found among the slain.

== Aftermath ==
Bonaparte needed to depart for Paris urgently and the next morning sent Berthier on a surprise visit to Austrian headquarters. Within 24 hours of the battle, Melas entered into negotiations (the Convention of Alessandria) which led to the Austrians evacuating northwestern Italy west of the Ticino, and suspending military operations in Italy.

Bonaparte's position as First Consul was strengthened by the successful outcome of the battle and the preceding campaign. After this victory, Napoleon could breathe a sigh of relief. The generals who had been hostile to him could see that his luck had not abandoned him. Thus, he had surpassed Schérer, Joubert, Championnet, and even Moreau, none of whom having been able to inflict a decisive blow on the Coalition. Moreau's victory at Hohenlinden, which was the one that in reality had put an end to the war, was minimised by Bonaparte who, from then on, would pose as a saviour of the fatherland, and even of the Republic. He rejected offers from the Count of Provence, Louis, who had considered the Consulate to be a mere transition toward the restoration of the king. Thanks to the victory at Marengo, Napoleon could finally set about reforming France according to his own vision.

=== Propaganda ===
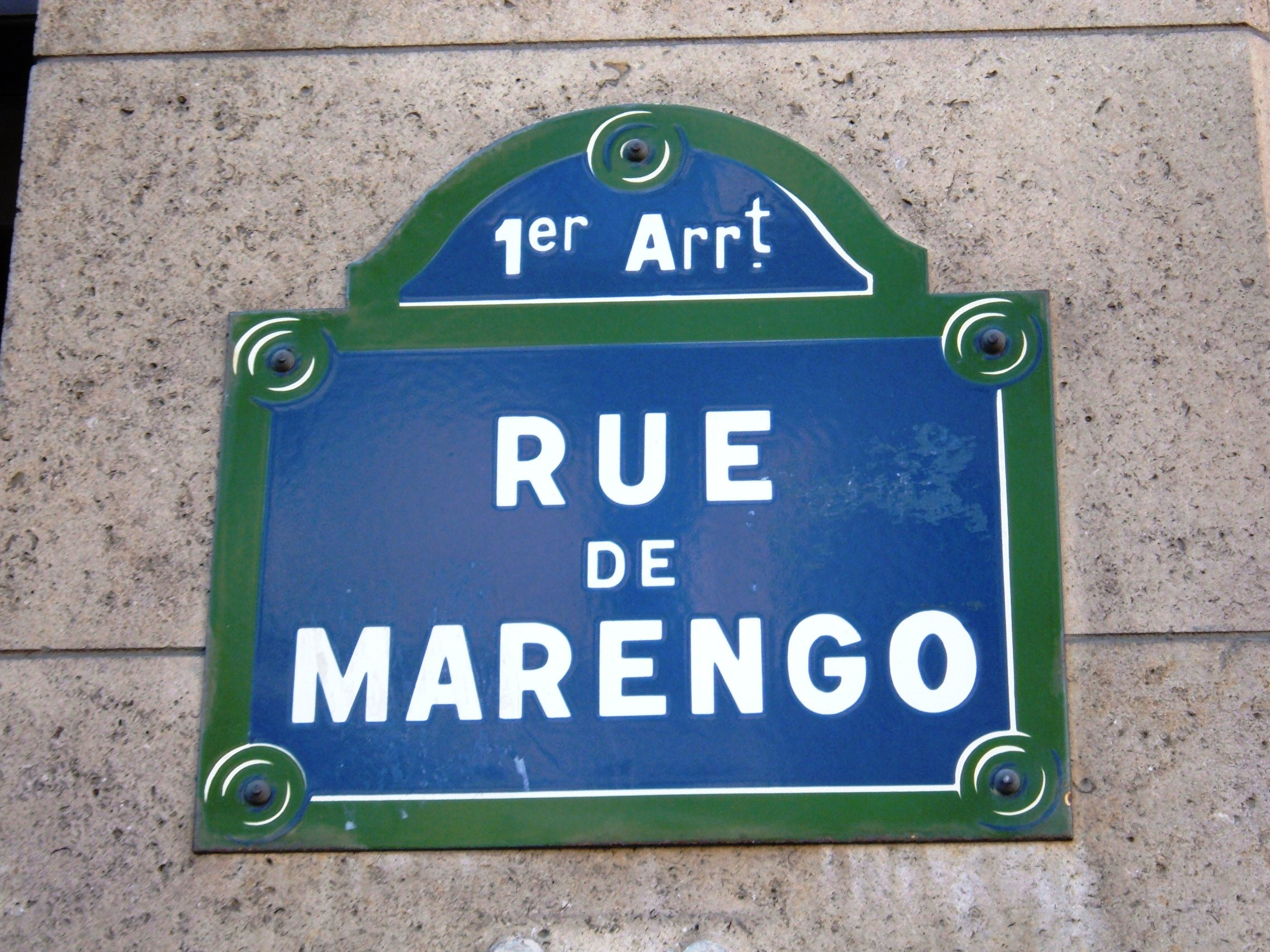
Rue de Marengo in Paris is named to commemorate the battle.

A last-gasp victory in reality, Marengo was mythologised in an army bulletin and three increasingly glamourised "Official Reports" during Bonaparte's reign. Tales were invented about the Guard and the 72^{ème} demibrigade, which had been under his direct control throughout.

General François Kellermann distinguished himself at Marengo. Melas, trapped in Alessandria with his hopes of breaking through to the east shattered, sent the same evening to Vienna a message in which he explained that the "charge of Kellermann had broken the soldiers and this sudden and terrible change of fortunes finished by smashing the courage of the troops. The disorder of the cavalry which had disorganised our infantry precipitated its retreat." At the same time, Murat was writing to Berthier: "I especially have to tell you about Kellermann; through a powerful charge he managed to tilt the balance in our favour." However, in the Bulletin de l'armée issued the following day, Napoleon sought to counterbalance Kellermann's charge with Jean-Baptiste Bessières's: "The chef de brigade Bessières, in front of the reckless grenadiers of the guard, executed a charge with as much activity as valour and penetrated the line of the enemy cavalry; this resulted in the entire rout of the army."

Another piece of work which attempted to justify the retreat maneuver and to present it as a highly strategic calculation was Berthier's Relation de la bataille de Marengo, published in 1804. Berthier suggests that time had to be given to Desaix and Boudet's division to occupy their positions: "The enemy general misinterpreted this maneuver and thought the army was in full retreat, while in reality it was only executing a movement of conversion." However, it is known that Desaix's arrival, while definitely expected, was not certain before the retreat. The bulletin explains that Desaix's forces were waiting in reserve with artillery pieces, which in reality was false, because they arrived late in the battle. Several participants to the fighting reveal the precarious condition of the army throughout the day, including Marmont in his Memoirs, Captain Coignet: "We were retreating in good order but all ready to start running at the earliest sign of danger", Captain Gervais: "In this battle, we were many times on the verge of being defeated. The enemy cavalry, on a terrain favourable to this arm, charged us repeatedly. We were often obliged to concentrate and even to retreat", and General Thévenet: "There is no doubt that a part of the French army was repelled up to the Scrivia".

== Legacy ==
=== Marengo museum ===
The Museum of Marengo "Museo della Battaglia di Marengo" is located in Via della Barbotta, Spinetta Marengo, Alessandria. This is the place where most of the fights between the French and Austrian armies took place. It is a part of Villa Delavo, with the park of the museum surrounding the village of Marengo.

=== Remembrance ===
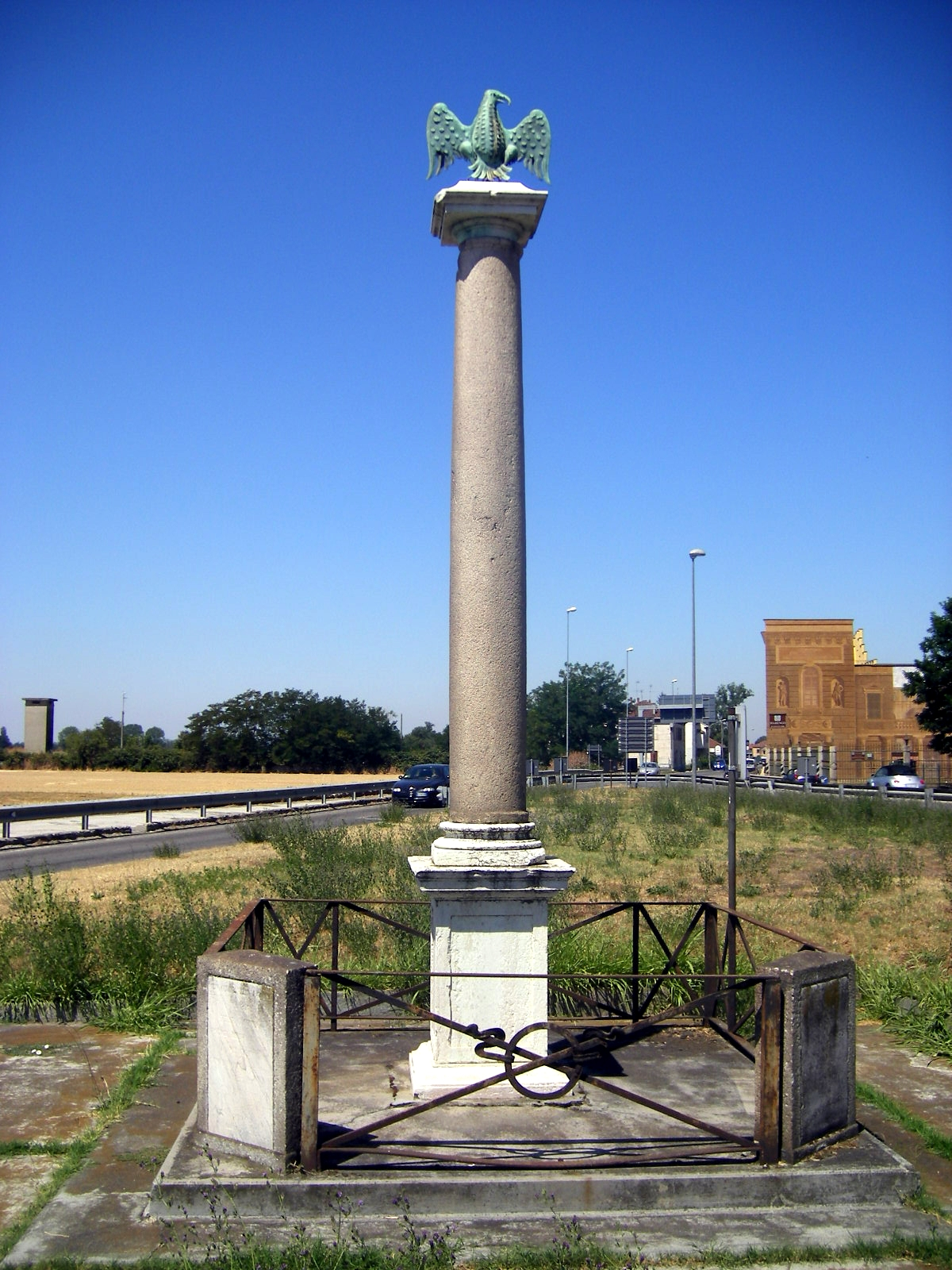
The column at Marengo

Napoleon sought to ensure that his victory would not be forgotten, so, besides the propaganda campaign, he entrusted General Chasseloup with the construction of a pyramid on the site of the battle. On 5 May 1805, a ceremony took place on the field of Marengo. Napoleon, together with Empress Joséphine seated on a throne placed under a tent, oversaw a military parade. Then, Chasseloup gave Napoleon the founding stone, on which was inscribed: "Napoleon, Emperor of the French and King of Italy, to the manes of the defenders of the fatherland who perished on the day of Marengo." This pyramid was actually part of a very ambitious project meant to glorify Bonaparte's conquests in Italy. The field of Marengo was supposed to become the site of a "city of Victories" whose boulevards, named after Italian battles, would converge to the pyramid. In the event, the project was abandoned in 1815 and the stones recovered by the peasants. The column erected in 1801 was also removed, only to be restored in 1922.

Napoleon ordered that several ships of the French Navy be named Marengo, including Sceptre (1780), Jean-Jacques Rousseau (1795), Ville de Paris (1851) and Marengo (1810). In 1802, the Marengo department was named in the honour of the battle. Furthermore, Napoleon's mount throughout the battle was named Marengo and further carried the Emperor in the Battle of Austerlitz, Battle of Jena-Auerstedt, Battle of Wagram, and Battle of Waterloo.

After Napoleon's fall, Marengo County, Alabama, first settled by Napoleonic refugees with their Vine and Olive Colony, was named in honour of this battle. Since then, numerous settlements were named Marengo in Canada and the United States (see places named Marengo).

Presently, a museum of the battle exists on the outskirts of Alessandria. Re-enactments are also organised every year to commemorate the event.

=== Chicken Marengo ===
The French dish chicken Marengo was named in honour of Napoleon's victory. Dunan, chef to Napoleon's army in Italy, is generally credited with the invention of this recipe. He had to create a meal in haste in the evening after the battle for the victorious General Bonaparte. Having no butter on hand and deciding that it would take too long to roast a chicken whole, he chose to fry the chicken pieces in olive oil with some local tomatoes and onions.

=== Puccini's Tosca ===
The Battle of Marengo plays an important role in Puccini's 1900 opera Tosca (libretto by Luigi Illica and Giuseppe Giacosa), which is set in Rome 100 years earlier. In Act I, reports are received of an Austrian victory. In Act II, while Scarpia interrogates Cavaradossi with Tosca present, a police agent rushes in and announces that the initial reports had been mistaken and that the battle had been won by Napoleon. Cavaradossi exultantly shouts "Vittoria!" and his fate his sealed.

== See also ==
- Military career of Napoleon Bonaparte

== Footnotes ==
| Preceded by Battle of Montebello (1800) | French Revolution: Revolutionary campaigns Battle of Marengo | Succeeded by Convention of Alessandria |
