= 9th Light Infantry Regiment =

French army regiment in the Napoleonic Wars

The 9th Light Infantry Regiment (9e régiment d’infanterie légère) was a French army regiment. One of the most notable infantry regiments in the Napoleonic Wars, it was awarded the title of "Incomparable" by Napoleon Bonaparte after its brilliant performance at the Battle of Marengo on the 14th of June, 1800. The regiment went on to serve with high distinction in the Ulm Campaign, at the Battle of Dürenstein (11 November 1805), the Jena Campaign (1806), and the Battle of Friedland (14 June 1807). The regiment then served in the Peninsular War taking a notable role at the Battle of Talavera 27–28 July 1809 and the Siege of Badajoz (1812). Battalions from the regiment also fought on the Wagram Campaign (1809), at the Battle of Leipzig (16–19 October 1813), and Napoleon's campaigns in France (1814). During the Hundred Days the 9th Light fought at Battle of Ligny (16 June 1815) and the Battle of Wavre (18–19 June 1815). The regiment was disbanded in the aftermath of the Bourbon Restoration.

== Formation ==
The 9th Light's origins begin in 1758 with the creation of the Volontaires de Clermont-Prince, an irregular corps of foreign mercenaries raised to fight for King Louis XV of France. The regiment was composed of a mixture of infantry, grenadiers and dragoons, and was intended to fight in the advanced guard of the army. After the Seven Years' War (1756-1763), the original regiment underwent a number of reorganizations, becoming the Légion de Clermont in 1763 and then, after a change of proprietor, the Légion de Condé in 1766. The regiment was dissolved in 1776.

In 1784, a battalion of foot chasseurs (chasseurs à pied) was added to the 4th horse chasseurs (chasseurs à cheval) and a new regiment created, called the Chasseurs des Cévennes. Many of the foot battalion's officers were veterans of the Légion de Condé.

On 17 March 1788, a reform saw the creation of twelve independent light infantry battalions. The Chasseurs des Cévennes was therefore reformed. The cavalry component of the regiment was renamed the Chasseurs de Bretagne (later 10th horse chasseurs). The infantry battalion retained the title Cévennes and was ranked ninth among the twelve light infantry battalions.

On 1 January 1791, the French army was stripped of its feudal regimental titles. The Cévennes battalion became known as the 9th Battalion of Foot Chasseurs.

== Amalgamations ==
On 5 March 1794 the 9th Battalion of Foot Chasseurs was amalgamated with two battalions of National Guard Volunteers, both of which had recently created from smaller ‘free corps’ of light infantry.

28th (b) Battalion of Chasseurs Formed on 14 February 1794 and composed of: 2nd Company, Chasseurs of the Louvre Company of Tirailleurs (lit. sharpshooters) of the Meuse Company of Chasseurs de la Mort (lit. Death) Company of Chasseurs of Mont d’Havre Company of Chasseurs of Morbihan Company of Chasseurs of the Seine and Marne

Battalion of Scouts of the Meuse Formed on 12 September 1793 and composed of: Four companies of Chasseurs of the Meuse Free Corps of the Meuse Free Corps of Guillaumes Two Companies, Chasseurs of L’Herault.

This new force became known as the 9th Half-Brigade of Light Infantry. It was unaffected by a second wave of amalgamations which occurred in the spring of 1796. In fact, the 9th Light was unique among France's infantry regiments in retaining the same regimental number from 1791 until the end of the Napoleonic Wars in 1815.

On 24 September 1803, the 9th Light was retitled 9th Regiment of Light Infantry (9e régiment d’infanterie légère); often abbreviated to 9th Light (9e léger).

On 1 August 1814, the 9th Light was merged with the first and fourth battalions of the 36th Light. Being the senior regiment, it retained its title.

== Military operations ==
=== War of the First Coalition (1792-1797) ===
The 9th Light served principally in the Army of the Ardennes and then the Army of the Sambre and Meuse through this first phase of conflict. Their baptism of fire came on 23 May 1793 at a skirmish with the Austrians near Philippeville in Belgium. It was present at the Battle of Neerwinden (18 March 1793), the Battle of Hondschoote (6 September 1793), the Battle of Wattignies (15–16 October 1793) and the Battle of Fleurus (26 June 1794). The 9th Light saw action in numerous actions serving with the celebrated advanced guard division of General François Séverin Marceau-Desgraviers.

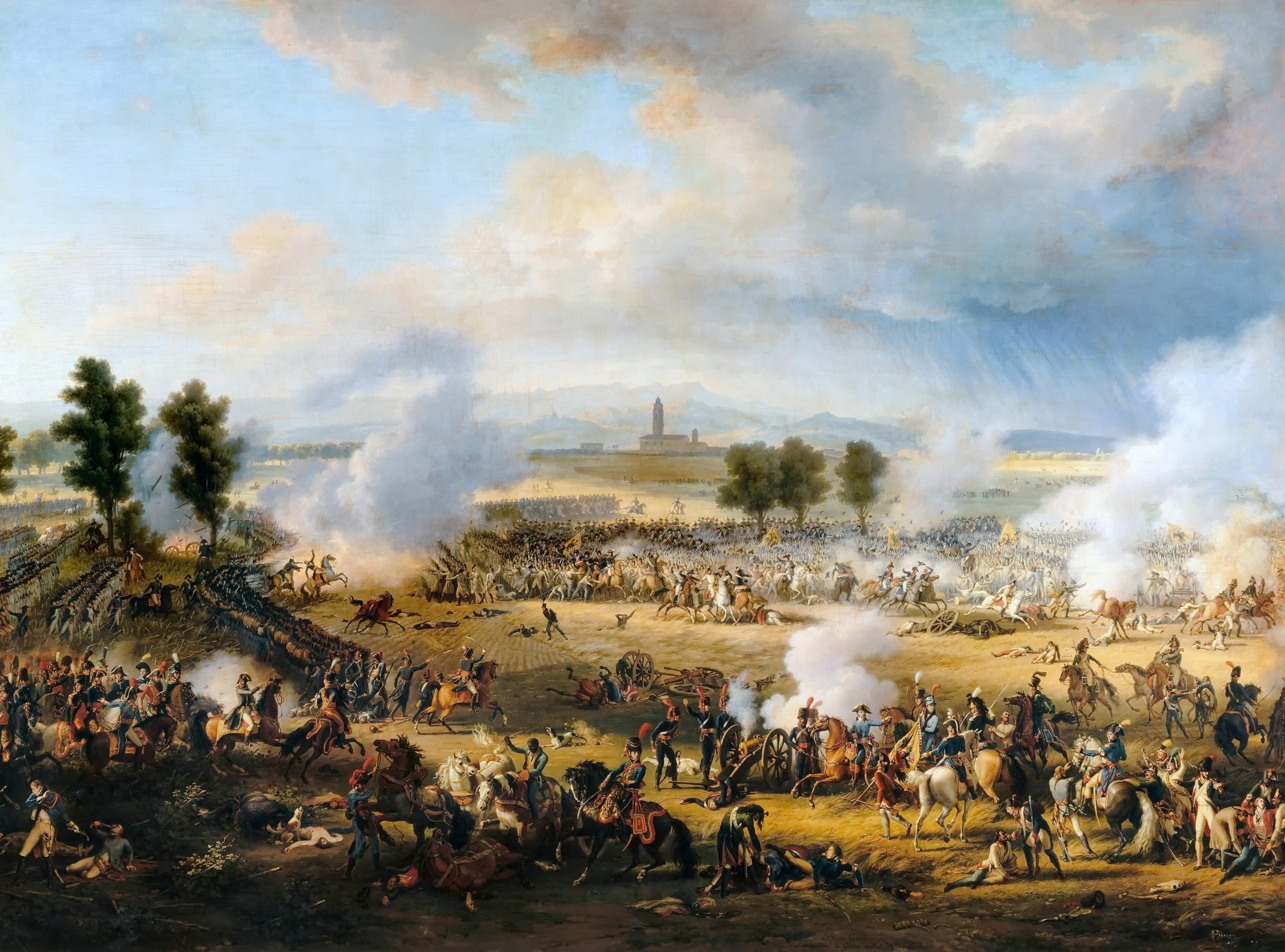
The 9th Light lead the charge at Marengo. The Battle of Marengo by Louis-François Lejeune

=== War of the Second Coalition (1798-1802) ===
Earmarked as part of the Army of England in 1797, the 9th was assigned to the Paris garrison and remained in the French capital until the autumn of 1799. After the Brumaire coup d'état, two battalions of the 9th Light were sent to suppress a royalist uprising in the west of France. The third battalion was sent to reinforce the French troops in Switzerland. The 9th Light was assigned to the Army of the Reserve in the spring of 1800 and put in the division of General Jean Boudet, along with the 30th and 59th Line Half-Brigades. Boudet's division participated in the Battle of the Chiusella (26 May 1800) and numerous actions on the way to seize Milan. The 9th was particularly distinguished in the attempt to force a crossing over the River Po at Piacenza (5–7 June 1800). On 14 June 1800 the 9th Light distinguished itself at the Battle of Marengo, earning the title L’Incomparable. The day before the battle, Boudet's Division had been sent to block the Alessandria-Genoa road. Under the command of General Louis Desaix, Boudet's troops arrived late on the battlefield, by which time the French army had been forced to retreat. While Desaix conferred with the First Consul, Boudet was ordered to delay the Austrian advanced guard under General Anton von Zach. The 9th Light attacked the Austrian column and forced it to deploy, giving time for French artillery to be brought up and for the remainder of Boudet's infantry to deploy. When preparations for a counterattack were completed, Desaix put himself at the head of the 9th Light where he was killed at the beginning of the attack. A cavalry charge led by General François Étienne de Kellermann crowned the attack and threw the Austrian advanced guard into confusion. By nightfall the Austrians were pushed back and Napoleon was able to declare a famous victory, albeit one plucked from the jaws of defeat.

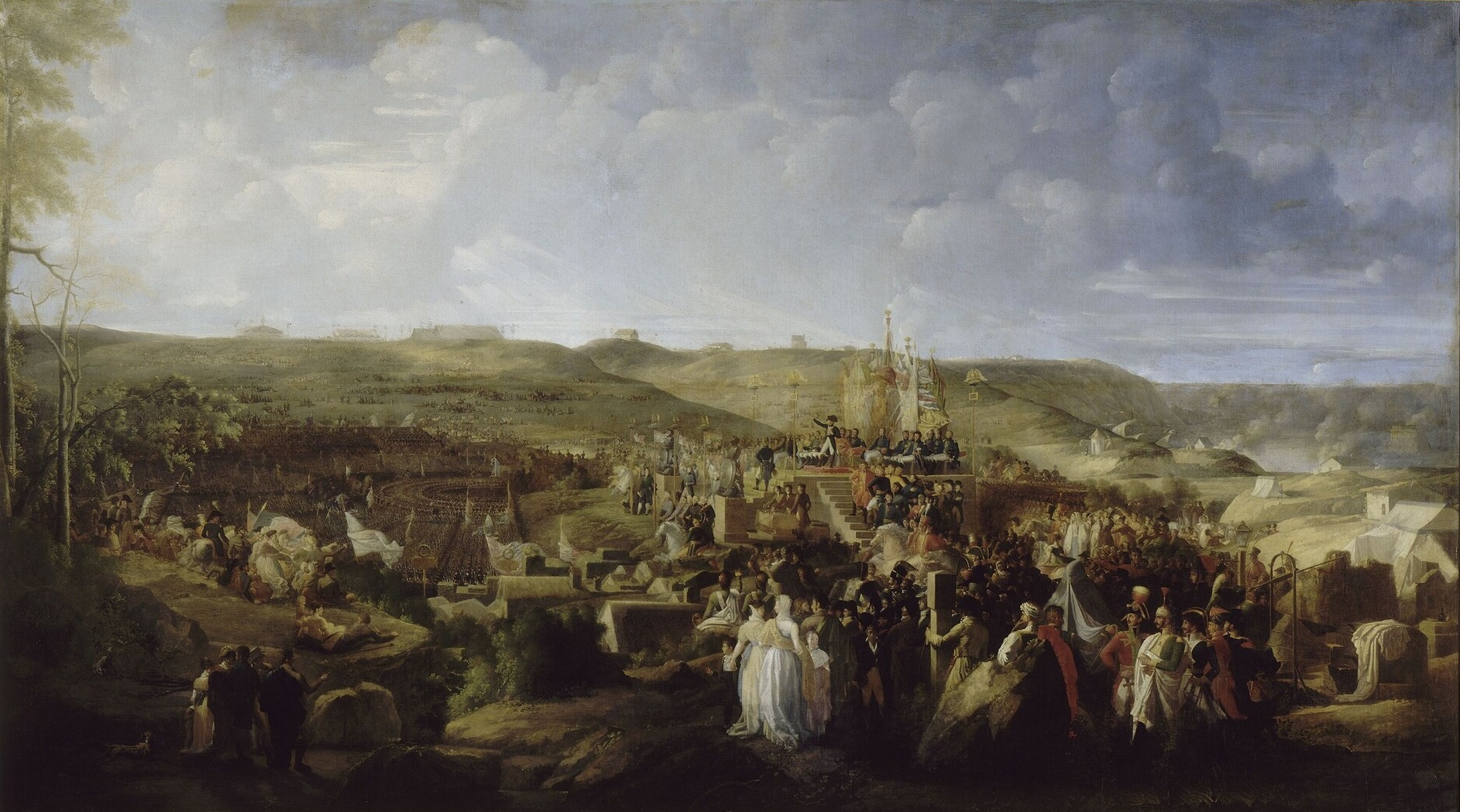
The 9th Light took part in the grand ceremony at the Camp of Boulogne on 16 August 1804.

=== War of the Third Coalition (1805) ===
After a spell forming the Paris garrison the 9th Light was ordered to Normandy in the summer of 1803 to prepare for the invasion of England. Towards the end of the year the regiment was transferred by sea to the camps being formed around Boulogne. The 9th Light was based at the camp of Montreuil near Étaples, forming the 1st Brigade of the division of General Dupont in Marshal Ney's VI Corps of the Grand Army. In August 1805 Ney's Corps was ordered to quit the Channel coast and march on Germany to face an Austro-Russian force which was assembling on the Danube. The 9th Light were distinguished at Haslach on 11 October and took part in the pursuit of the Austrian forces attempting to escape from the city of Ulm. Transferring to VII Corps under Marshal Mortier, the 9th Light again distinguished itself at Dürenstein on 11 November 1805. Following this battle, Dupont's Division was considered exhausted and was sent to garrison Vienna. The 9th Light therefore missed the Austerlitz, the culminating battle of the war on 2 December 1805.

=== Peninsular War (1808-1814) ===
On 27–28 July, the regiment took part in the battle of Talavera where they were part of Ruffins 1st Division when they made a daring night assault on an apparently defenseless hill, initially they beat back two battalions of the Kings German Legion, three British battalions counterattacked and the 9th were beaten back with 300 casualties.

== Dissolution ==
Following Napoleon's second abdication and the return of the Bourbons, the Imperial army was disbanded. Through the course of September 1815 the 9th Light's soldiers were either sent home, or marched off to form the nucleus of a new French army.

The regimental stores and treasury eventually went to a new entity called the Legion of Ardennes. This was reformed in 1820 and called the 1st Light Infantry; then the 76th Line Infantry Regiment in 1855.

However, when a new 9th Light Infantry was formed in 1820, this regiment adopted the traditions of its Napoleonic forebears even through there was no administrative link or shared personnel. In 1855 the 9th Light was reformed as the 84th Line Infantry Regiment.

== Commanders ==
The list of commanders for the 9th Light Infantry was wrongly cited in the official regimental history. Based on the surviving correspondence in the French army's archives, the following list of commanders is accurate.

- Colonel Viscount François-Emmanuel de Toulongeon (24 September 1784)
- Lieutenant-Colonel Chevalier Joseph de Barroussel (1 May 1788)
- Lieutenant-Colonel Pierre Justin Marchand de Villionne (1 April 1790)
- Lieutenant-Colonel Jacques-Marie-Blaise Segond de Sederon (25 July 1791)
- Lieutenant-Colonel Mathieu Labassée (6 April 1793)
- Brigade Commander (chef de brigade) Michel Eirisch (19 February 1794)
- Brigade Commander Marie-François Auguste de Caffarelli du Falga (4 June 1797)
- Brigade Commander Mathieu Labassée (4 January 1800)
- Colonel Claude Marie Meunier (19 July 1803)
- Colonel Guilhem Dauture (18 February 1810)
- Colonel Claude-Marcel D’Eslon (25 November 1813)
- Colonel Paul Hyppolite Alexandre Baume (1 August 1814)

Note: Mathieu Labassée enjoyed two spells as commander. His first tenure came to an end with the amalgamation of the original foot battalion in 1794.

== Ranks and Hierarchy ==
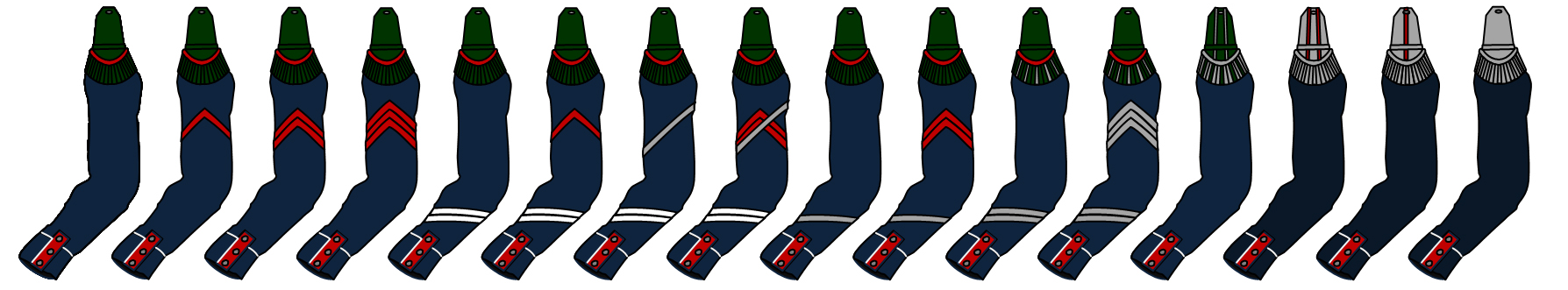
Rank insignia

- Chasseur
- Chasseur with 10 years service
- Chasseur with 15 years service
- Chasseur with 20 years service
- Caporal
- Caporal with 10 years service
- Caporal-Fourrier
- Caporal-Fourrier with 15 years service
- Sergent
- Sergent with 15 years service
- Sergent-Major
- Sergent-Major with 20 years service
- Adjudant
- Sous-Lieutenant
- Lieutenant
- Capitaine

== Equipment ==
Clothing	Equipment	Weapons
Habit	Giberne	Fusil
Veste	Porte-giberne	Sabre
Pantalon	Baudrier de fusil	Baïonette
Sarrau de toile	Caisse de tambour	Fourreau de baïonn
Bonnet de police	Cor-de-chasse	

== Garrisons and Depot ==
Following its creation at Carcassonne in 1784, the 9th Light held garrison at a number of locations. Based in Paris during the Directory and Consulate periods, it was mainly based at Longwy during the First Empire.

A forward depot was created at Bayonne during the Peninsular War to manage supplies heading for the regiment in Spain.

The majority of recruits during the First Empire were drawn from the Vosges Department and were processed by a recruitment party based at Epinal. Although principally French, the regiment was assigned conscripts from the Netherlands, Germany and Italy as the Empire expanded.

== Political impact of French Revolution ==
Prior to 1791 the 9th Light's officer corps was almost exclusively of noble birth. By 1793 only two of these officers remained with the battalion, the majority having taken promotions in other regiments where the officers had emigrated from France. A number of officers ‘deserted to the enemy’ on the outbreak of hostilities in 1792.

In August 1792 the Marquis de Lafayette attempted to stage a coup with the troops under his command, including the 9th Light. The battalion was then involved in the treason of General Charles François Dumouriez in April 1793, where the commander of the battalion, Lieutenant Colonel Segond attempted to steal the army's pay chest and go into exile with Dumouriez. A number of officers and soldiers from the 9th Light went over to the Austrians with Segond.

== Honours and flags ==
The 9th Light was awarded the title ‘Incomparable’ after its brilliant performance at the [Battle of Marengo] on 14 June 1800.

In June 1802 Napoleon Bonaparte awarded the Ninth three specially commissioned flags. These had a sunburst design with the title L’INCOMPARABLE written in the centre.

The fate of original 1791 flag issued to the 9th Light is unknown. It is likely it went with the Lieutenant Colonel into exile after the Dumouriez treason in 1793.

In 1804 the 9th Light was awarded two ‘eagle’ standards. It appears to have retained at least one of the special 1802 standards. This remaining flag was hidden in 1814 at the home of a retired officer.

The official battle honours awarded to the regiment in 1811 were Ulm, Friedland, Essling and Wagram.

The 2nd Battalion's eagle was lost in action at Mohrungen on 25 January 1807. The regiment's colonel lied to Napoleon and was able to conceal the loss because actual eagle had been broken from its pedestal in an accident. This was hastily mounted on a hop pole. Napoleon later learned the truth from the Russian gazettes. According to the Russian sources this captured flag may have carried the 1802 pattern silk.

In 1814 Colonel D’Eslon hid the regiment's surviving eagle, revealing it on Napoleon's return from exile in May 1815. The regiment therefore probably embarked on the Hundred Days campaign with its original 1804 Eagle.

Many awards of honour were given to men serving in the 9th light infantry. The most famous was a ‘sword of honour’ given to Captain Hippolyte Cazaux who daringly captured a rearguard of 80 Austrians at Piacenza on 6 June 1800.

The Napoleonic 9th Light should not be confused with the title ‘Un Contre Dix’ which belonged to the 84th Line. This honorific title was added to ‘L’Incomparable’ in the mid-nineteenth century following the creation of a new 84th Line Infantry Regiment.

== Regimental histories ==
The officially recognised regimental history of the 9th Light was published in 1905. It was written by Lieutenant Léon Loÿ.

A serving officer in the 84th Line, Loÿ's history owed much to a manuscript history written by L. Dubois of the 9th Light in 1839; this author being responsible for collating the dossiers in the archives at the Service Historiques de la Défense (SHD) in the Chateau de Vincennes.

It also used a contemporary historical summary drawn up by the Ninth's commander, Mathieu Labassée in 1802.

A modern history of the regiment was published by Oxford's Osprey Publishing in 2012. By author T.E. Crowdy, this history incorporates a number of pieces of oral history which were not available to Loÿ a century or more before.

== Re-enactment group ==
In 1976 a re-enactment group was set up to depict the 9th Light Infantry. With a wide membership base, this group has been notable for its high standard of uniform and drill interpretation. Formerly based at Chatham's Fort Amherst, the group's membership expanded across Europe. The group has been present at numerous events and celebrations making the bicentennial of the French Revolution and Napoleonic Wars.
