= Anton von Elsnitz =

- Born: 28 September 1742; Vienna, Austria
- Died: 31 December 1825 (aged 83); Maria Enzersdorf, Austria
- Military career
- Allegiance: Habsburg monarchy
- Branch: Cavalry
- Service years: 1763–1809
- Rank: Feldmarschallleutnant
- Conflicts: War of the Bavarian Succession; Austro-Turkish War (1787–1791); French Revolutionary Wars
- Other work: Inspector General of the Remount Branch

Franz Anton Freiherr von Elsnitz (born 28 September 1742 in Vienna; died 31 December 1825 in Maria Enzersdorf) was an Austrian cavalry soldier and commander during the War of the Bavarian Succession, Austro-Turkish War (1787–91), and French Revolutionary Wars.

== Career ==
Born on 28 September 1746 in Vienna, he entered Daun Infantry Regiment N°59 on 1 June 1763, then later the same year transferred to the First Arcieren Life Guard as Oberleutnant. In 1766 he transferred to a Cuirassier Regiment. He was promoted captain in 1775, major in 1786 and Oberstleutnant in 1790. He received promotion to Oberst of Chevau-léger Regiment N°18 in 1792. He fought in the War of the Bavarian Succession (1778–1779) and in the wars against the Turks (1787–1790). In the autumn of 1789, he took part in the Siege of Belgrade.

In 1793 he served with his regiment under Prince Josias of Saxe-Coburg-Saalfeld in the Austrian Netherlands, and fought at the Battle of Neerwinden on 18 March, Caesar's Camp on 7 August, Cysoing on 28 August and at the Siege of Dunkirk from 24 August to 8 September. In 1794 he fought at the Siege of Landrecies in April, Battle of Tourcoing in May, Tournai on 22 May and in the second Battle of Fleurus on 26 June. In 1795, he and his regiment fought on the middle and upper Rhine. He was distinguished in the pursuit of the French after their defeat at Mainz on 23 October and on 13 November at Tellheim. On 4 March 1796, he was promoted to General-major. Initially he commanded a brigade of four battalions and 16 squadrons in Pál Kray’s column in the Army of the Upper Palatinate under the Archduke Charles. He led a cavalry brigade in Wilhelm von Wartensleben’s corps in August. Detached with a mixed foot and cavalry division, he held up François Joseph Lefebvre at Schweinwurt, preventing him from joining Jean-Baptiste Jourdan's army at the Battle of Würzburg on 3 September 1796. He was in action on the Lahn on 16 September. In 1797 he commanded a column of Franz von Werneck’s right wing under Maximilian Anton Karl, Count Baillet de Latour, and served in the retreat after the Battle of Neuwied in April 1797. He was defeated at Giessen on the 21st. He commanded a brigade in Italy at the Battle of Magnano, 5 April 1799 and the Siege of Mantua under Kray. On 27 July he stormed St. Georges, leading to the surrender of the place. He then served under Peter Karl Ott von Bátorkéz in August. Promoted Feldmarschallleutnant on 2 October 1799, he served in Konrad Valentin von Kaim’s division.

In 1800 he commanded a detached division of 25,000 (soon reduced to 10,000) men facing Louis-Gabriel Suchet on the Var River and was involved in clashes during the general offensive of 6 April. His right wing was driven from Sette Panir on the 10th. He repulsed Suchet from Monte San Giacomo on 12 April, and again on the 19th. Under Michael von Melas from the 29th, he captured Monte Lingo on 2 May. He defeated Jean Pierre, baron Pouget on the Monte di Toria on 7 May, but was repulsed from the Var bridgehead on the 13th. On Melas’s return to Turin, Elsnitz was left to command the 18,000-man corps facing Suchet on the Var, around 20 May. Despite orders to the contrary, he again attacked on the Var on the 27th, and was again severely repulsed. On the 28th he began a difficult retreat. His rearguard was overwhelmed at the Col di Brauis 2 June, and on the following day he was seriously defeated at the Battle of the Tenda Pass. His rearguard was again overwhelmed at Pieve on the 5th. Eventually he reached Ceva on 7 June having lost half his command. With the remains of his force he concentrated before Alessandria on the 12th. He led the cavalry of Karl Joseph Hadik von Futak's central attack column at the Battle of Marengo on 14 June 1800.

Elsnitz retired in late 1809 and died in Maria Enzersdorf on 31 December 1825.
