= Konrad Valentin von Kaim =

- Born: Johann Konrad Valentin Ritter von Kaim; 28 November 1737; Gengenbach, Germany
- Died: 16 February 1801 (aged 63) Udine, Italy
- Allegiance: Kingdom of France, Habsburg monarchy
- Branch: Infantry
- Service years: 1770–1801
- Rank: Feldmarschallleutnant
- Conflicts: Seven Years' War; French Revolutionary Wars; Siege of Kehl; Battle of Würzburg; Battle of Verona; Battle of Magnano; Battle of Marengo; Battle of Pozzolo
- Awards: Military Order of Maria Theresa (Knight's Cross)

Johann Konrad Valentin Ritter von Kaim (28 November 1737 (baptised) – 16 February 1801) was a French soldier and Austrian infantry commander during the French Revolutionary Wars. Kaim initially joined the French forces in the Seven Years' War, but later transferred his allegiance to Austria. In November 1788, he was promoted to Colonel. He was mortally wounded at the Battle of Pozzolo on Christmas Day 1800, but did not die until several weeks later. He was born in Gengenbach and died in Udine.
