= Jean-Charles Monnier =

French Infantry Commander

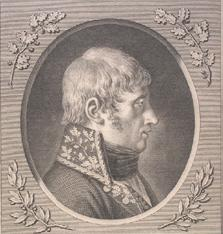
- General Monnier by Barbier l'aîné
- Born: 22 March 1758; Cavaillon, France
- Died: 29 January 1816 (aged 57); Paris, France
- Military career
- Allegiance: Kingdom of France (1791-1792), French First Republic; Bourbon Restoration
- Branch: Infantry
- Service years: 1789–1815
- Rank: General of Division
- Commands: Royal army of the south (Hundred Days)
- Conflicts: French Revolutionary Wars; Hundred Days
- Awards: Légion d'honneur (Commander); Order of Saint Louis (Knight); Name inscribed under the Arc de Triomphe
- Other work: Peer of France

Jean-Charles, comte Monnier (22 March 1758 in Cavaillon – 29 January 1816 in Paris), was a French infantry commander during the French Revolutionary Wars and the Hundred Days. Monnier's name is inscribed on the Arc de Triomphe as 'Monier'.
