= Joseph von Schellenberg =

- Born: January 1735; Vienna, Austria
- Died: 8 September 1801 (aged 66); Napajedla, Bohemia
- Military career
- Allegiance: Habsburg monarchy
- Branch: Infantry
- Service years: 1788-1801
- Rank: Feldmarschallleutnant
- Conflicts: French Revolutionary Wars
- Awards: Military Order of Maria Theresa (Knight's Cross)

Joseph Freiherr von Schellenberg (born 1735 in Vienna; died 8 September 1801 in Napajedla) was an Austrian infantry commander during the French Revolutionary Wars.
