= Battle of Chiusella River =

Battle of the War of the Second Coalition

- Part of the Marengo campaign within the War of the Second Coalition
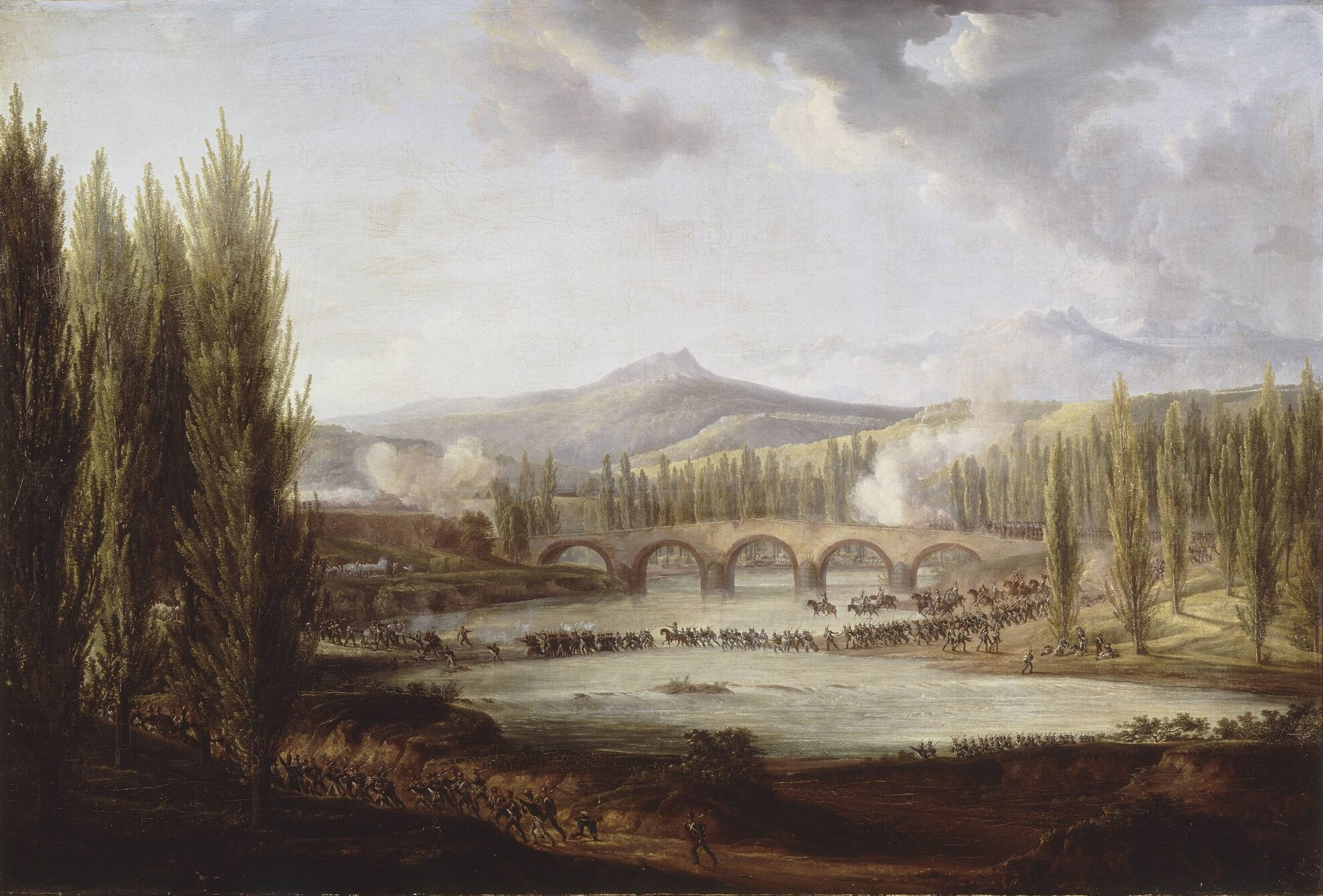
- Combat of Chiusella bridge, 26 May 1800 by Jean-Rodolphe Gautier, 1800–1815
Date	26 May 1800
Location	Romano Canavese, Italy 45°23′N 07°52′E
Result	See § Results

Belligerents
Republican France	(Holy Roman Empire) Habsburg Austria

Commanders and leaders
(France) Napoleon Bonaparte (France) Jean Lannes	(Holy Roman Empire) Karl Joseph Hadik

Strength
12,000	5,000–10,000

Casualties and losses
200–1,700	122 killed 284 captured (Note: 224 of the captured soldiers were wounded, and 60 of them were captured unwounded.); 216 horses
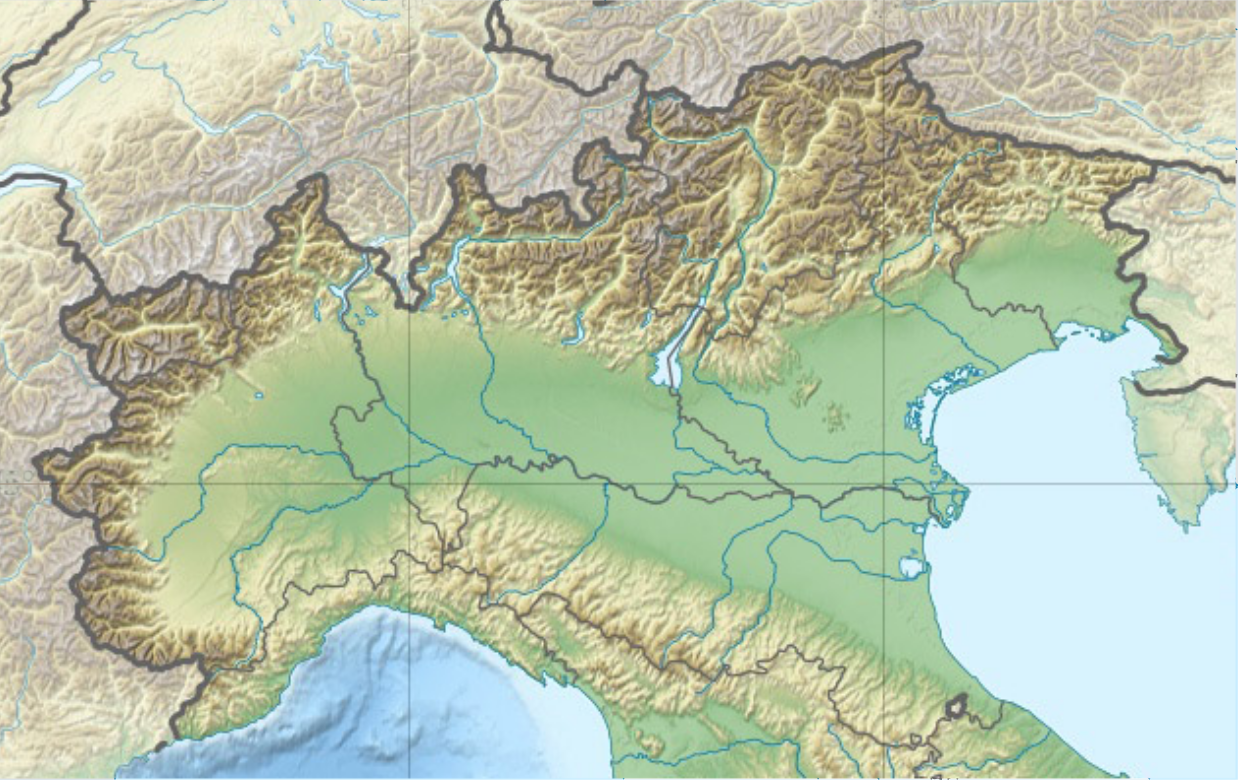
- Location within Northern Italy Battle of Chiusella River (Europe)

The Battle of (the) Chiusella River or Battle of Romano (26 May 1800) saw the vanguard of a French Republican army led by First Consul Napoleon Bonaparte attack a Habsburg Austrian division led by Feldmarschall-Leutnant (FML) Karl Joseph Hadik von Futak. The action occurred in the Marengo campaign during the War of the Second Coalition. In May 1800, Bonaparte's Reserve Army crossed the Great St Bernard Pass into the Aosta Valley in northwestern Italy. Though its advance was delayed by Fort Bard, the Reserve Army's vanguard under General of Division (GD) Jean Lannes moved past the fort and captured Ivrea. Hadik attempted to block the French at the Chiusella River north of Romano Canavese. After a hard-fought action, the Austrians withdrew toward Turin. Hadik's battle report finally helped convince the Austrian army commander General der Kavallerie Michael von Melas that the main French threat was coming from the Aosta Valley.

== Background ==
=== Italian operations ===
By the beginning of 1800, the French armies in Italy had lost all the ground that Napoleon Bonaparte had conquered in his Campaign of 1796–97. The French Army of Italy under GD André Massena counted only 36,000 men fit to take the field. The army held a line from Genoa to the Col de Tende while 10,000 more held the passes through the Alps. GD Jean-de-Dieu Soult with 20,000 soldiers held Genoa, GD Louis-Gabriel Suchet defended the Col de Tende with 12,000 men, while GD Louis Marie Turreau was far to the northwest with 4,000 more at Mont Cenis.

On 4 April 1800, Michael von Melas launched an offensive against Genoa with 62,000 troops. Guarding the mountain passes leading into northwest Italy was FML Konrad Valentin von Kaim with 31,000 men, while there were 20,000 more soldiers in various Italian garrisons. Melas' forces also included 14,389 Piedmontese soldiers. After desperate fighting between 6 and 19 April, Melas split the French Army of Italy in two, isolating Massena and Soult in Genoa. In this two-week period, the Austrians sustained over 8,000 casualties while inflicting 7,000 losses on the French. Directing FML Peter Karl Ott von Bátorkéz and 24,000 men to carry out the Siege of Genoa, Melas and FML Anton von Elsnitz with 28,000 troops drove Suchet's outnumbered corps west along the Mediterranean coast. By 11 May, Melas was in Nice and his troops reached the Var River.

=== Reserve Army ===
Bonaparte returned to France from Egypt on 9 November 1799 and immediately conspired to overthrow the unpopular French Directory. He succeeded in the Coup of 18 Brumaire (9 November 1799) and on 25 December, Bonaparte became First Consul, a position in which he exercised dictatorial power. On 25 January 1800, Bonaparte ordered GD Louis-Alexandre Berthier to create a 60,000-man Reserve Army at Dijon. To mask this from Coalition spies, various strategems were employed, so that the Austrian government did not appreciate that the Reserve Army was a major threat to its operations in Italy.

Berthier was appointed Commander-in-chief of the Reserve Army with GD Pierre Dupont as Chief of staff. The army's Chief of Artillery was General of Brigade (GB) Auguste de Marmont who commanded 48 guns. The initial organization of the Reserve Army was as follows.

List of French Reserve Army units on 10 May 1800
Corps	Divisions	Strength
Vanguard	GD Jean Lannes	8,000
GD Guillaume Duhesme	GD Louis Henri Loison	7,000
GD Guillaume Duhesme	GD Jean Boudet	8,000
GD Claude Perrin Victor	GD Jean-Charles Monnier	4,000
GD Claude Perrin Victor	GD Jacques Chambarlhac	6,000
GD Claude Perrin Victor	GD Joseph Chabran	5,000
GD Joachim Murat	Cavalry	4,000
Reserve Army	Grand Total	42,000

Bonaparte intended for the Reserve Army to march to Geneva and use the Great St Bernard Pass to enter northwestern Italy. Chabran's division would use the Little St Bernard Pass and join the army at Aosta. Turreau would advance from Mont Cenis and a token force would use the Simplon Pass. By agreement, GD Jean Victor Marie Moreau, the army commander in Germany, was supposed to send GD Claude Lecourbe's corps across the Gotthard Pass. On 13 May 1800, Moreau informed Bonaparte that he could only spare GD Bon-Adrien Jeannot de Moncey leading a smaller corps. Ultimately, Moncey brought 11,500 soldiers into northern Italy.

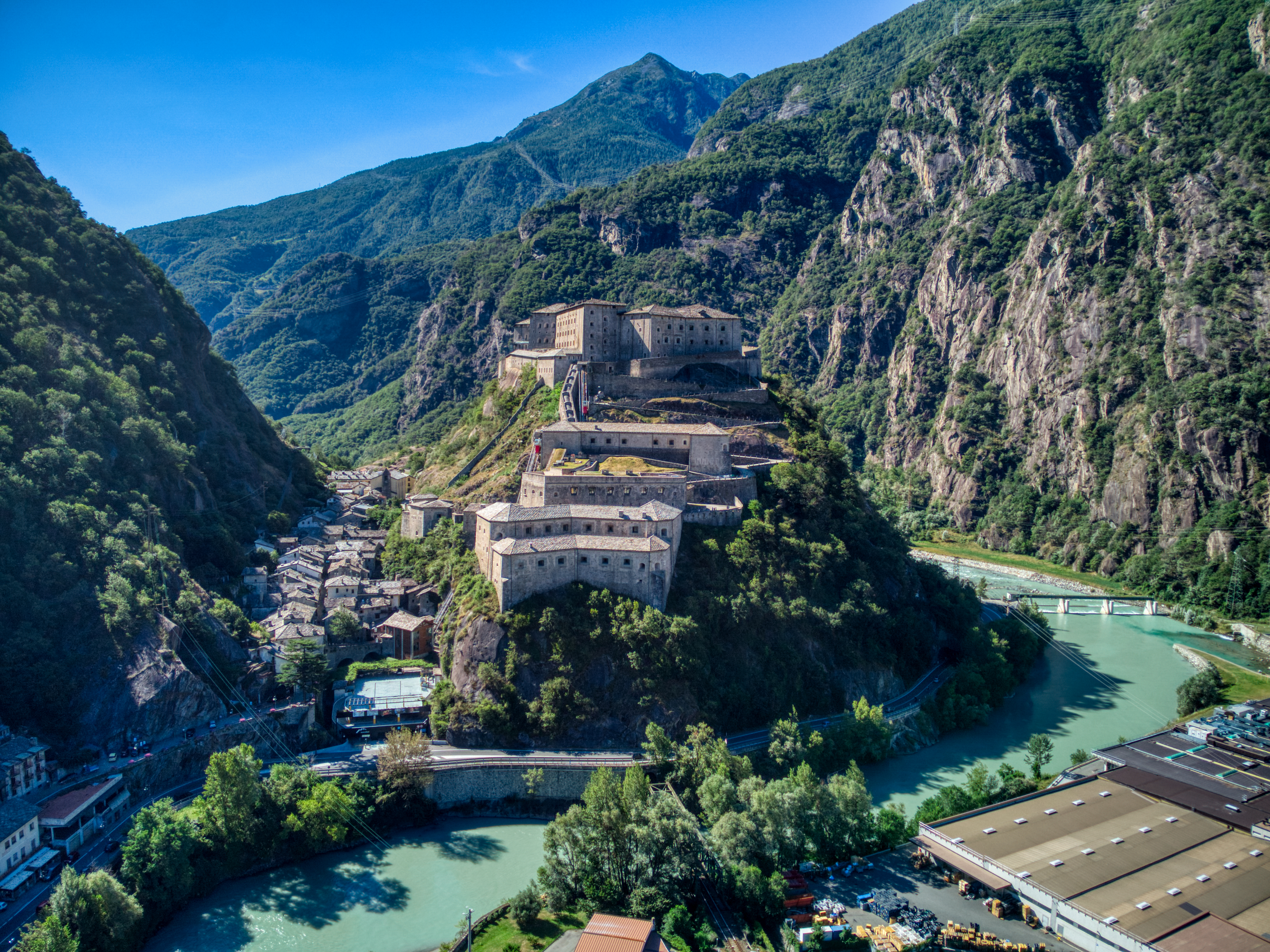
Fort Bard overlooks the road passing along the Aosta Valley.

Early on 15 May 1800, the Reserve Army started from Martigny to cross the Great St Bernard Pass. By 16 May, Lannes' Vanguard occupied Aosta after a skirmish with its Austrian defenders and was joined by Chabran's division. By 17 May, the French had 12,300 infantry, 1,400 cavalry, and 14 artillery pieces in the Aosta Valley. The following day, Lannes' Vanguard defeated six Austrian infantry companies and three guns at Châtillon. GD François Watrin's division captured the town while GB Jean Rivaud's cavalry brigade harassed the retreating Austrians. The French sustained only 90 casualties while capturing 350 of their foes despite the Austrians getting some belated cavalry support. On 19 May, the French encountered Fort Bard which proved to be a formidable obstacle defended by a bristling array of cannons. Though the fort had only 350 defenders, its commander Captain Stockard di Bernkopf determined to hold the place.

On 21 May, the French bombarded Fort Bard with three 12-pounder guns but this had little effect. An attempt was made to storm the fort, but it failed. Lannes used difficult footpaths to get his infantry and some cavalry past the fort, but it was impossible use the paths to move artillery. Finally, the French sneaked two 8-pounders, two 4-pounders, and two howitzers on the street past the fort. On 25 May, Bonaparte passed Fort Bard to join Lannes' Vanguard. Lannes failed in his first attack on Ivrea but tried again and captured Ivrea on 24 May. Led by Generalmajor (GM) Auguste-François Landres de Briey, the 800 Austrian defenders suffered 300 casualties and lost 14 guns. (Note: Another source stated that the French faced 2,000 Austrians, capturing 500 men and 15 guns (Arnold, p. 104).) French losses were 7 killed and 25 wounded. Behind Lannes, the French divisions were in the order Boudet, Loison, Monnier, and Chambarlhac. Chabran's division was given the task of reducing Fort Bard, which finally surrendered on 2 June when the French gunners created a breach in the fort's walls.

== Battle ==
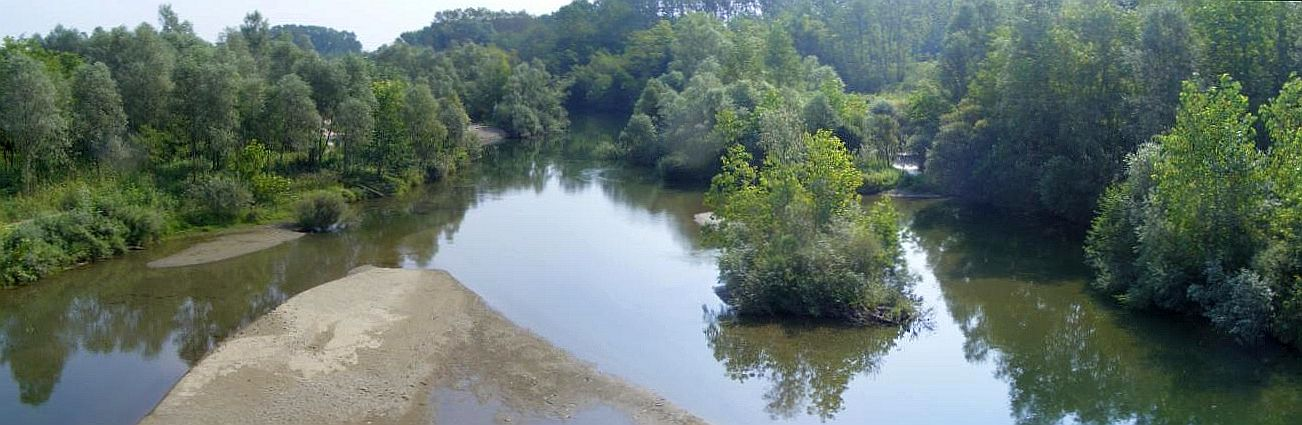
The Chiusella near Romano Canavese

Between Ivrea on the north side and Romano Canavese on the south side, the Chiusella River flows east before emptying into the Dora Baltea River. Late on 24 May, Lannes received the six artillery pieces that made it past Fort Bard. His troops marched toward the Chiusella line, but Lannes spent all day on 25 May reconnoitering the Austrian position. Hadik had 5,000 soldiers entrenched behind the Chiusella supported by 20 guns. There were 4,000 more troops holding some nearby heights to prevent French flanking maneuvers. A significant number of defenders were hired Piedmontese soldiers. Hadik's force included 2 battalions of the Michael Wallis Infantry Regiment Nr. 11, 1½ battalions of the Franz Kinsky Infantry Regiment Nr. 47, the Lobkowitz Dragoon Regiment Nr. 10, and 4 squadrons of the Kaiser Dragoon Regiment Nr. 1. The two cavalry regiments were led by GM Joseph Palffy and GM Giovanni Pilati, respectively. In addition, at least part of the Deutsch-Banat Grenz Infantry Regiment Nr. 12 was present. Since Hadik was convinced that he only faced one French division, he did not destroy the bridge. (Note: Arnold's account of the battle stated that the Latour Dragoon Regiment Nr. 11 was engaged (Arnold, p. 105). This is unlikely since that regiment served at the Battle of Stockach (1800) and Battle of Messkirch in Germany (Smith, pp. 181–182). Arnold stated that the 4th Battalion of the Bannater Grenz fought at Marengo, so it is possible that the unit was at the Chiusella (Arnold, p. 272).)

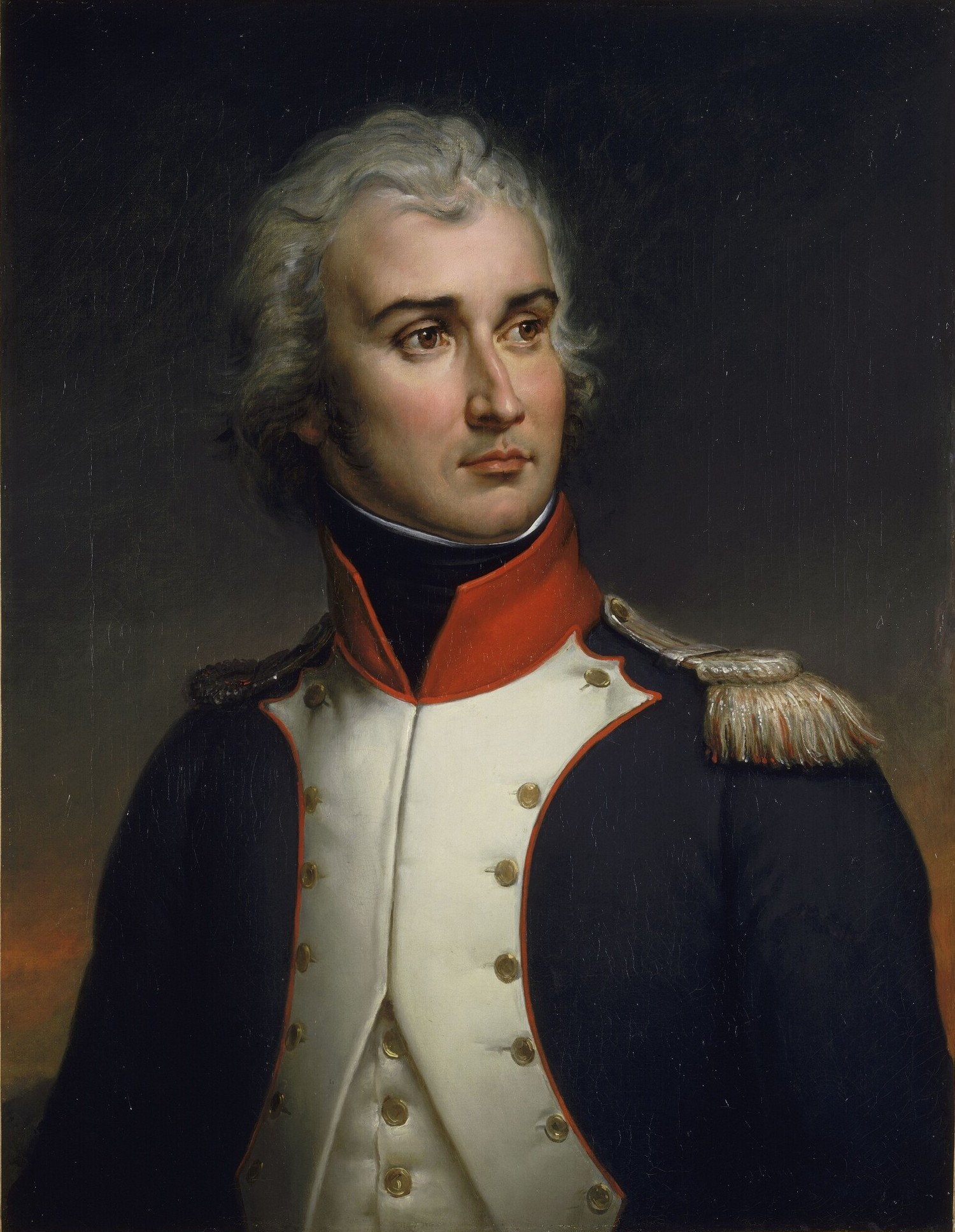
Jean Lannes

In fact, Lannes had 12,000 troops available, as follows.

List of French units at the Battle of Chiusella River on 26 May 1800 (Note: Smith's order of battle did not include Rivaud's cavalry brigade which was mentioned in Arnold's account (Arnold, p. 105). Rivaud's units are from the Marengo order of battle (Smith, p. 186).)
Divisions/Brigades	Units
GD François Watrin	6th Light Infantry Regiment
GD François Watrin	22nd Line Infantry Regiment
GD François Watrin	40th Line Infantry Regiment
GD Jean Boudet	9th Light Infantry Regiment
GD Jean Boudet	30th Line Infantry Regiment
GD Jean Boudet	59th Line Infantry Regiment
GB Jean Rivaud	12th Hussar Regiment
GB Jean Rivaud	21st Horse Chasseur Regiment

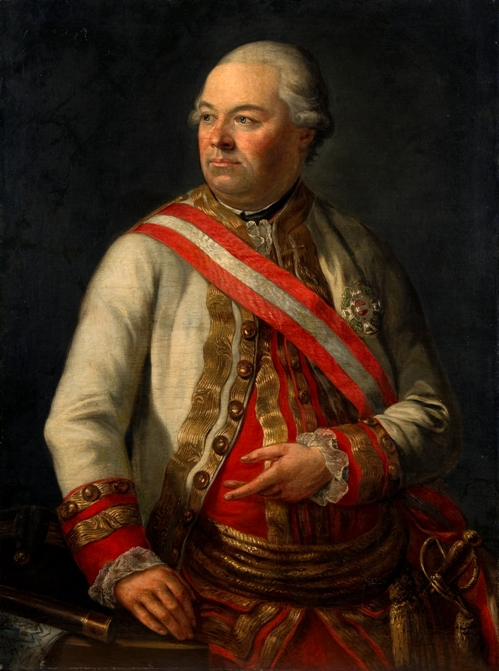
Karl Joseph Hadik

At 5:00 am on 26 May 1800, the 6th Light Infantry Regiment moved through a wheat field to attack the bridge. The assault was met by intense fire from four cannons behind a log barricade and repulsed. The French regiment rallied and attacked again, storming across the bridge and forcing its defenders to flee. However, the 6th Light was pounded by ten more Austrian guns and thrown into confusion. At this moment, one battalion of the Franz Kinsky Infantry Regiment backed by the Banat Grenz Infantry counterattacked and threw the French back across the river.

After this setback, Watrin ordered the 22nd Line Infantry to attack, supported by the 40th Line Infantry. The 6th Light rallied again and waded across the Chiusella. Hadik brought up his cavalry though trees and shrubbery made it difficult for horsemen to be effective. Palffy led a charge by four squadrons of Austrian dragoons. The soldiers of the 6th Light hastily formed squares near a farmhouse. The dragoons were repulsed by the squares and Palffy was fatally wounded. The dragoons charged again and were driven off by the 22nd and 40th Line Infantry, which formed nearby squares. At this time, Lannes ordered Rivaud's cavalry brigade forward to assist Watrin's infantry.

Hadik sent forward the last dragoon regiment in order to extricate his other cavalry. The newly committed dragoons rode down a company of the 6th Light and attacked the 40th Line's squares. Behind the squares was a party of horsemen that included Bonaparte, Berthier, Duhesme, and Boudet. The group of generals was sufficiently alarmed to draw their swords, but the Austrian cavalry charge collapsed when it was hit by disciplined volleys from the squares. Two more unsuccessful cavalry charges followed before the Austrians quit the battlefield, harassed by the French 12th Hussar Regiment.

The above corresponds to the descriptions of the Battle of the Chiusella given by French commanders. The Austrian source's presentation of this battle differs to some extent. In short, as described in the following paragraph.

French troops under Lannes (on orders from Bonaparte) attacked Hadik's positions in order to secure access to the plain after the capture of Ivrea. The Austrians held the stone bridge over the Chiusella for a long time. The French were able to capture it only after General Macon forded the river and advanced to the defenders' rear. During an attempt to recapture the bridge in a cavalry attack, Palffy was mortally wounded. Due to the difficult terrain, Hadik withdrew his forces to Montalenghe. There, Pilati's Austrian dragoons launched a brilliant counterattack, routing the French infantry on the road and pursuing them all the way to Romano. This successful cavalry charge gave Hadik time to move his infantry in an organised manner across the Orco River at Foglizzo and take up new defensive positions. Despite the fact that the French occupied Romano, the Austrians managed to avoid encirclement and inflicted significantly greater damage on the enemy: 1,700 dead and wounded among the French versus 348 among the Austrians. Austrian description of the battle is more extensive than those given by Watrin, Berthier, and Adjutant Major Brossier.

== Results ==
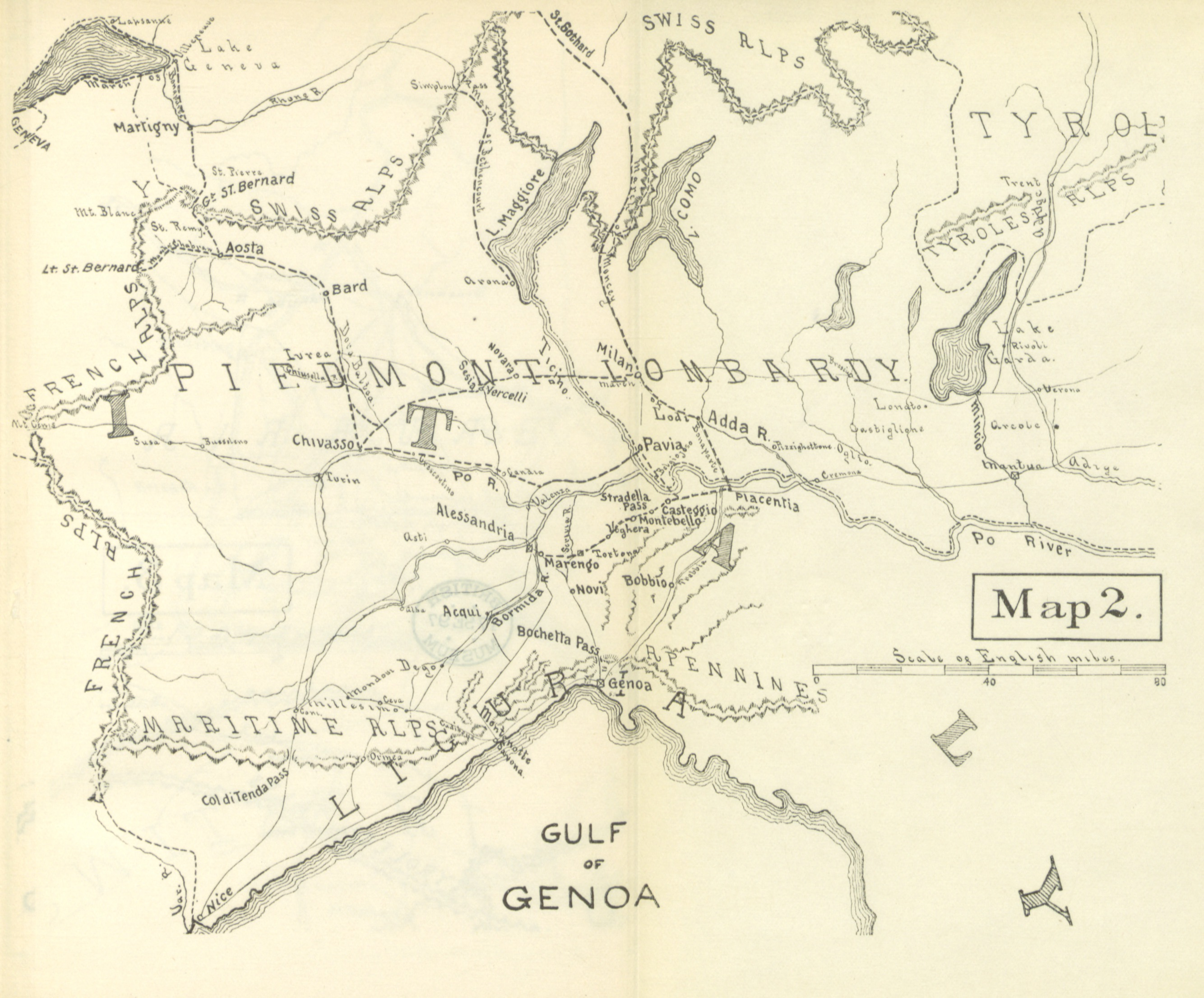
Map shows the 1800 Marengo campaign where the dashed line is the movements of the French. The Battle of Chiusella River took place at the D of PIEDMONT.

Digby Smith estimated that the 12,000 French suffered 1,700 casualties while the 5,000 Austrians lost 348 killed, wounded, and missing, plus 216 horses. Smith called the action an Austrian victory. The French admitted 250–300 casualties, while Bonaparte's official report reduced that number to only 200. The Austrians reported Palffy and 121 more soldiers were dead. The French claimed capturing 224 wounded and 60 unwounded Austrians. James R. Arnold represented the action as a French victory. Theodore Ayrault Dodge credited the Austrians with 10,000 troops and gave French losses as 250 men.

After breaching the Chiusella barrier, the French had the plains of the Po Valley opened to them. Hadik reported to Melas that he had fought 20,000 French troops and begged for help. Early in May, Melas received reports that the French were massing troops in Switzerland. On 13 May, he decided to take 9,000 soldiers from Elsnitz and go north with them from Nice to Turin. After the action on the Chiusella, Lannes advanced to Chivasso where he threatened Turin. After receiving Hadik's report and after a dragoon officer disclosed to him that he had seen Bonaparte at Romano, Melas finally realized that the main French threat was coming from the Aosta Valley. By 27 May, Melas had 18,000 men at Turin and believed that he was in a good position to block Bonaparte from relieving Genoa. In fact, Lannes' efforts were only a diversion and Bonaparte was about to move toward Milan, where he would sever part of Melas' communications with Austria.
