= Marengo campaign =

Campaign of the War of the Second Coalition

- Part of the War of the Second Coalition
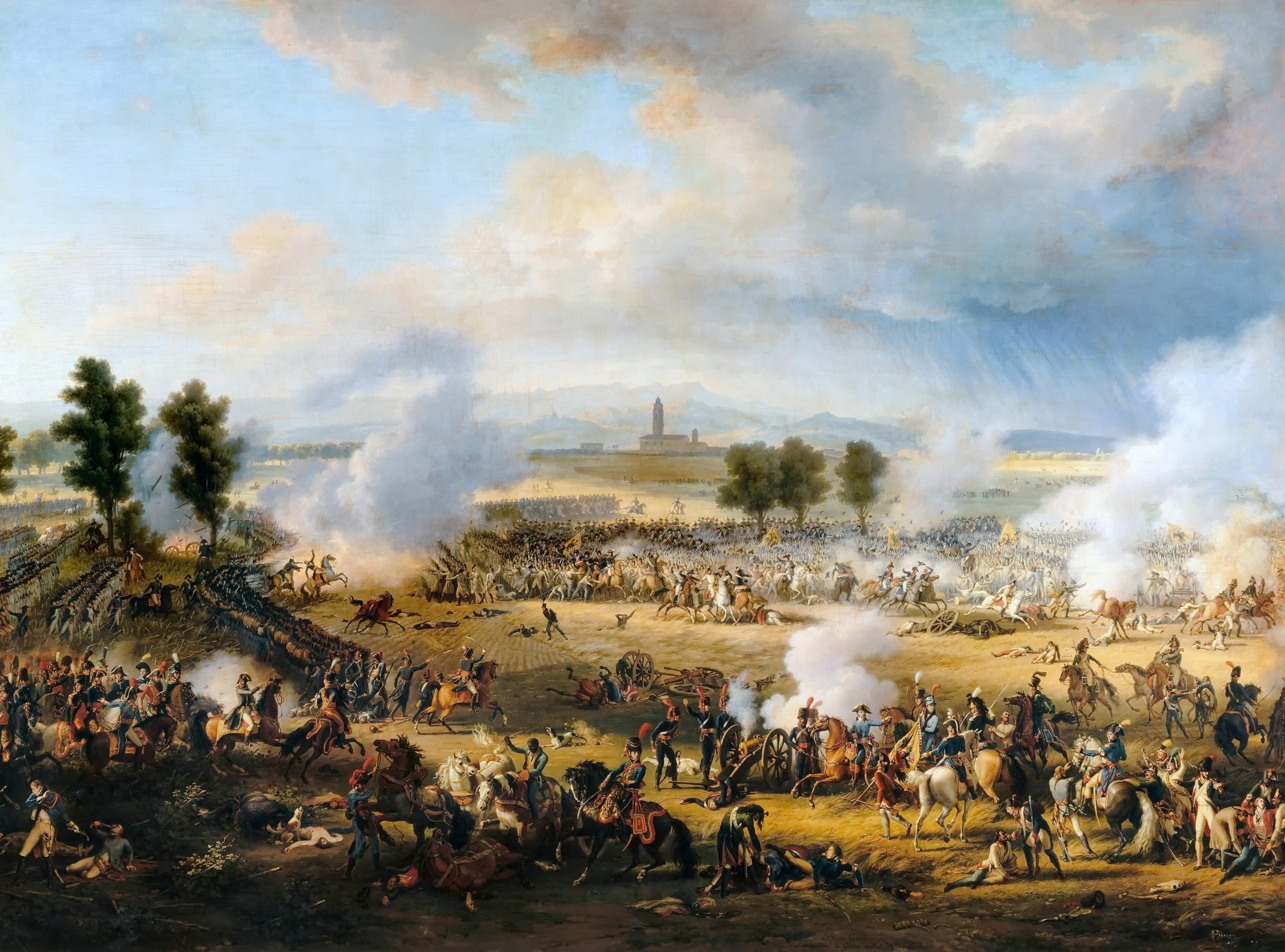
- The Battle of Marengo by Louis-François Lejeune
Date	4 April to 15 June 1800
Location	Liguria, Piedmont and Aosta regions in modern Italy 44°53′8″N 8°40′39″E
Result	French victory

Belligerents
(French First Republic) France (Genoa) Ligurian Republic	Habsburg monarchy Great Britain; Kingdom of Sardinia

Commanders and leaders
(French First Republic) Napoleon Bonaparte (French First Republic) André Masséna (French First Republic) Jean Lannes (French First Republic) Louis Berthier (French First Republic) Claude Victor (French First Republic) François Kellermann (French First Republic) Jean-de-Dieu Soult (French First Republic) Louis Desaix †	(Habsburg monarchy) Michael von Melas (WIA) (Habsburg monarchy) Peter Ott (Habsburg monarchy) Karl Hadik (DOW) (Habsburg monarchy) Anton Zach (POW) (Habsburg monarchy) Konrad Kaim (Habsburg monarchy) Anton von Elsnitz (Habsburg monarchy) Josef Bernkopf (Kingdom of Great Britain) George Elphinstone

Strength
(French First Republic) 28,000 men, 15 cannons (Genoa) 4,200 men	(Habsburg monarchy) 30,000 men, 100 cannons (Kingdom of Great Britain) 6 ships (Kingdom of Sardinia) 100 men

Casualties and losses
Total: 10,600–19,900; 3,600–7,550 killed 6,100–9,300 wounded 1,250 captured	Total: 21,427–26,616
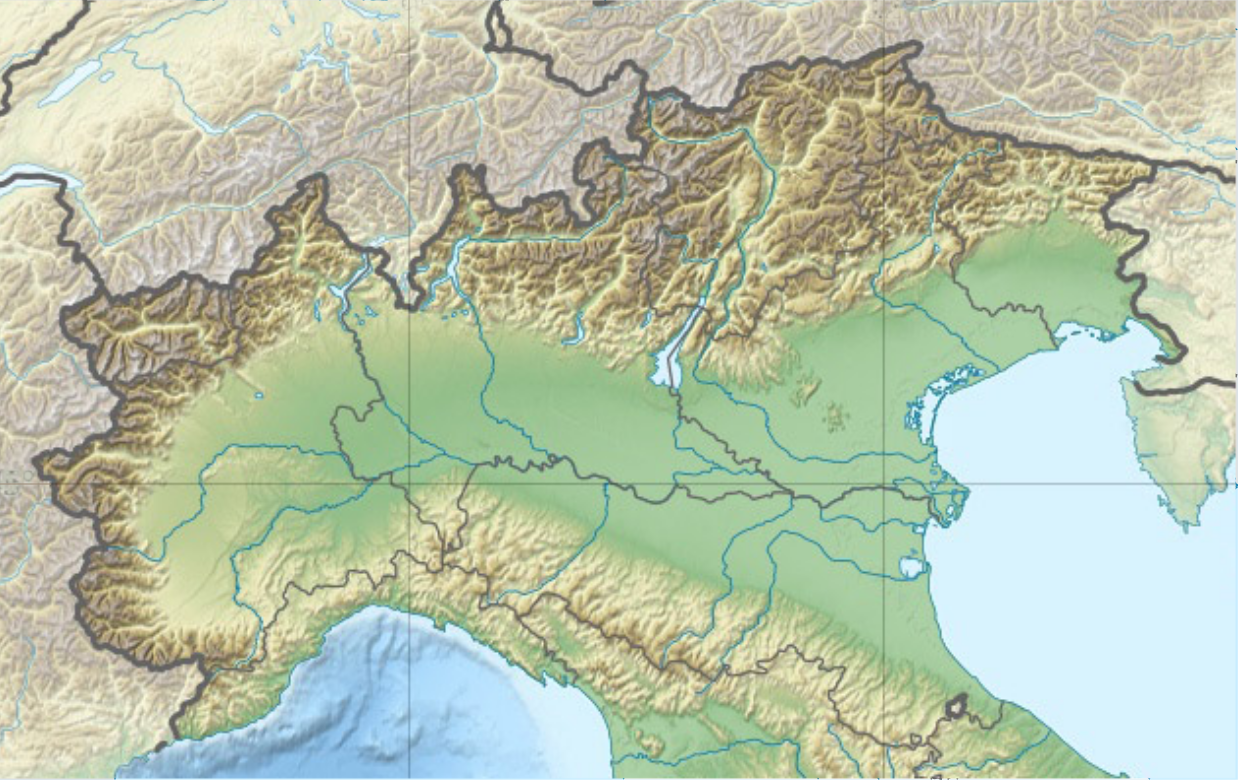
- Location within Northern Italy Marengo campaign (Europe)

The Marengo campaign (4 April – 15 June 1800) saw a Habsburg Austrian army led by General der Kavallerie Michael von Melas fight against the defending French Army of Italy under General of Division (GD) André Massena and the invading French Reserve Army commanded by First Consul Napoleon Bonaparte. In early April, Melas launched a successful offensive that split the outnumbered Army of Italy and initiated the Siege of Genoa with Massena's forces trapped within the city. In mid-May, Bonaparte led the Reserve Army across the Great St Bernard Pass and into the Aosta Valley. After encountering a serious delay at Fort Bard, Bonaparte's forces broke into the plains of the Po Valley toward the end of May. At Turin, Melas blocked the direct route to Genoa, but Bonaparte's forces instead seized Milan and began severing the supply lines between Melas' army and Austria. After a long siege, Massena finally surrendered Genoa in early June, but by that time Melas' forces were isolated in northwest Italy. Melas tried to break out of the trap in the Battle of Marengo on 14 June 1800 and nearly succeeded because Bonaparte spread his army too thin. However, late-arriving troops defeated the Austrians and Bonaparte compelled Melas to evacuate northwest Italy as the price of a negotiated truce.

== Background: 1799 ==
In early 1799, the French Directory deployed two armies in Italy. The Army of Naples led by GD Étienne Macdonald occupied Rome and Naples with 32,010 men. The Army of Italy under GD Barthélemy Louis Joseph Schérer defended northern Italy. In March, the Directory ordered Schérer to detach a 6,400-man division to invade and plunder the Grand Duchy of Tuscany. This left Schérer with only 43,000 men in his field army, not counting various occupying forces. The Austrian army commanded by Field Marshal Paul Kray counted 50,700 men, but a 24,551-strong Russian army under Field Marshal Alexander Suvorov was approaching. The indecisive Battle of Verona on 26 March was followed by the Battle of Magnano on 5 April 1799. At Magnano, the victorious Austrians reported 5,228 casualties but French losses were heavier. Leaving 12,000 men to defend Mantua, Schérer started a panicky retreat that did not stop until the French army reached the Adda River.

Schérer was replaced in command by GD Jean Victor Marie Moreau but the French were beaten at the Battle of Cassano on 27–28 April 1799. The string of major defeats continued with the Battle of Trebbia on 17–20 June, the surrender of Mantua on 28 July, the Battle of Novi on 15 August, and the Battle of Genola on 4 November. By the end of 1799, the French hold on Italy had dwindled to almost what it was in March 1796 when Bonaparte assumed command of the army. The badly fed and supplied French army clung to Genoa and the Italian Riviera. The army commander GD Jean-Étienne Championnet wished to abandon Genoa, but the Directory stubbornly refused to allow this. Championnet died of disease on 9 January 1800 and was eventually replaced by André Massena.

On 9 October 1799, GD Napoleon Bonaparte returned to France from Egypt. The "weak and corrupt" French Directory was very unpopular. Bonaparte immediately entered into a conspiracy to overthrow the Directory. The Coup of 18 Brumaire (9 November 1799) was successful and on 25 December, Bonaparte became First Consul, a position in which he held dictatorial power. On 25 January 1800, Bonaparte ordered GD Louis-Alexandre Berthier to assemble a 60,000-man Reserve Army at Dijon. To trick enemy spies, some second-class units began arriving at Dijon, while the first-class units began massing elsewhere. The Austrian government was completely fooled by this ruse and did not realize that the Reserve Army represented a serious threat.

== Strategy ==
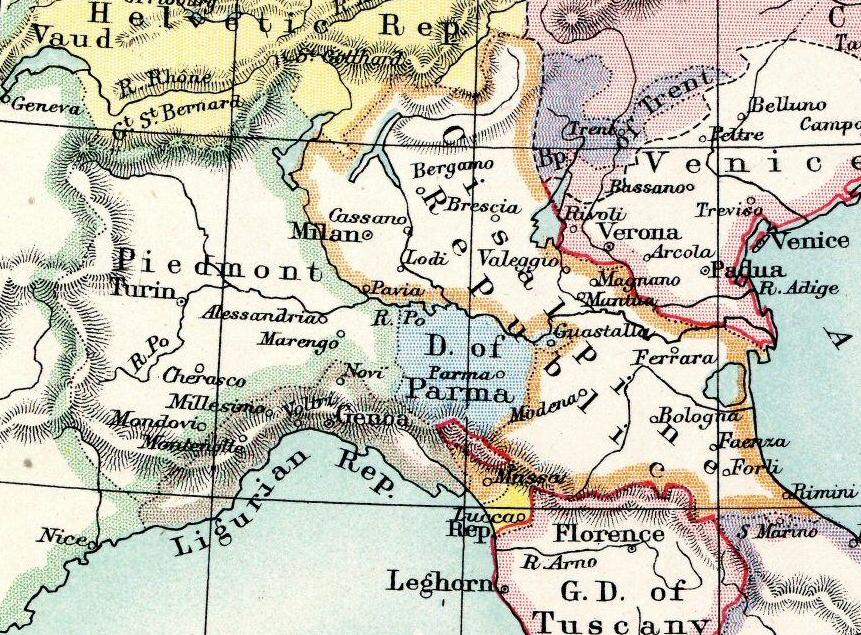
Map shows northern Italy in 1800, including Genoa, Turin, Milan, Nice, Marengo, and Great St Bernard Pass.

By 1800, the Russian Empire had withdrawn from the Second Coalition. The Austrians held Swabia in southern Germany and northern Italy. Since the French held Switzerland, the Austrian armies in Germany and Italy had difficulty communicating with each other. Meanwhile, the French could use Switzerland to easily shift forces from one theater to the other. Along the Rhine River, GD Jean Victor Marie Moreau led a 120,000-man French army, composed of the best troops available. Opposed to Moreau on the east bank of the Rhine was an Austrian army nearly as strong commanded by Paul Kray (now promoted to Feldzeugmeister). In Italy, Michael von Melas commanded an army of 100,000 men, including 86,000 infantry and 14,000 cavalry. Massena's Army of Italy was divided into three corps under GD Jean-de-Dieu Soult (19,790 men), GD Louis-Gabriel Suchet (15,607 men), and GD Louis Marie Turreau (8,000 men). It fielded only 36,000 men for active duty, though 14,000 sick soldiers were in hospitals.

The Austrian Aulic Council planned for Melas to capture Genoa, cross the Var River, and lay siege to Toulon. This would cause Moreau to send reinforcements from his own army. With Moreau weakened, Kray would then push across the Rhine and invade France through the Belfort Gap. Caught between the two thrusts, Switzerland would easily fall to Austria, and then Melas would march up the Rhône valley. The Kingdom of Great Britain pledged to help Austria capture Genoa and to assemble an army at Minorca that would be used to help Austria invade Provence. At first, Bonaparte planned to use the Reserve Army to carry out an enveloping maneuver against Kray's army in Swabia. However, Moreau obstinately refused to cooperate with Bonaparte's strategy. Therefore, Bonaparte left Moreau to carry out his own operations and instead decided to commit the Reserve Army to Italy. Bonaparte arranged for Moreau to transfer GD Claude Lecourbe's 25,000-man corps from Germany via Switzerland to assist his Italian campaign.

== Austrian offensive ==
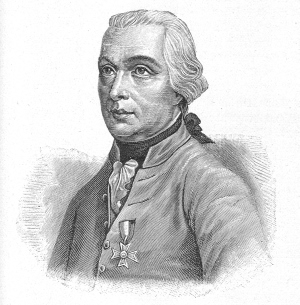
Michael von Melas

On 4 April 1800, Melas mounted his offensive against the Army of Italy and Genoa. According to James R. Arnold, Melas ordered FML Peter Karl Ott von Bátorkéz and 8,000 troops to advance from Bobbio, northeast of Genoa, while FML Prince Friedrich Franz Xaver of Hohenzollern-Hechingen and 5,300 soldiers moved against the Bocchetta Pass north of Genoa. West of Genoa, Melas with 27,500 men struck south from Acqui Terme and FML Anton von Elsnitz thrust east from Ceva with 21,100 troops. While Melas' main army attacked Genoa with 62,000 men, FML Konrad Valentin von Kaim with 31,000 soldiers watched the mountain passes and northern Italy. Another 20,000 men garrisoned various strongpoints in Italy. Theodore Ayrault Dodge assigned different strengths to the attacking columns: 40,000 soldiers to Melas, 15,000 to Ott, and 10,000 to Hohenzollern.

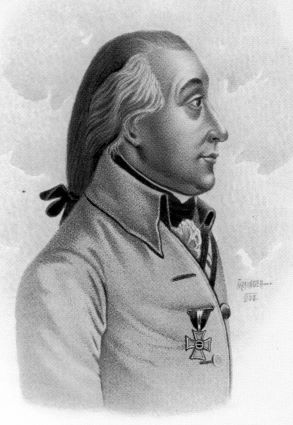
Peter Karl Ott

By 6 April, the columns of Melas and Elsnitz successfully broke the connection between the corps of Soult and Suchet at Cairo Montenotte. This breakthrough prompted Massena to mount a determined effort to reconnect with Suchet's forces. Massena left 8,000 troops in Genoa and tried to cut his way out, resulting in ten days of brutal fighting in the mountains. There were actions at Cadibona Pass on 6 April, Monte Fasce on 7 April, Bocchetta Pass on 9 April, Sassello on 10 April, Monte Settepani on 10–11 April, Vetriera on 11 April, Colle di San Giacomo on 12 April, and Voltri on 18 April. From 6 to 19 April, Austrian losses were 276 officers and 8,037 men, while the French lost around 7,000 casualties. The fighting resulted in Massena's troops being cooped up in Genoa. The Siege of Genoa would last from 19 April to 4 June 1800. The blockade was assisted by a British Royal Navy squadron under Admiral Lord Keith.

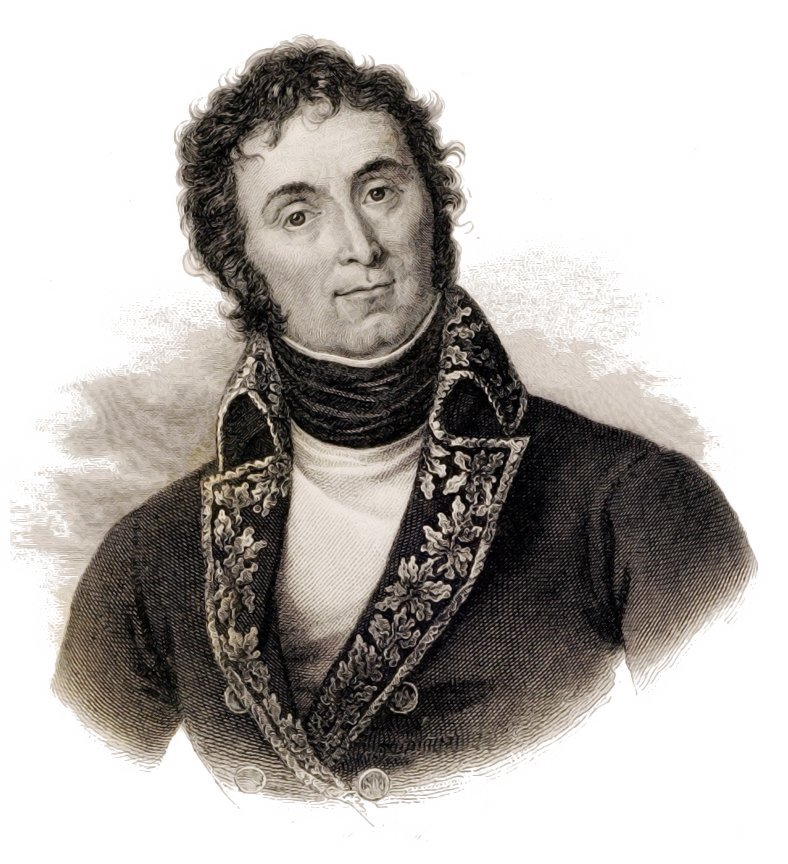
André Massena

On 24 April 1800, Melas demanded the surrender of Genoa which Massena refused. Melas assigned Ott and 24,000 soldiers to carry out the siege while accompanying Elsnitz and 30,000 troops to a pursuit of Suchet's corps along the coast. (Dodge credited 28,000 soldiers to Elsnitz.) On 30 April, Ott attempted to storm the defenses of Genoa but was repulsed with 3,147 casualties. The French defenders sustained 1,526 casualties, but the assault nearly succeeded. After this failure, Ott decided to starve the defenders into surrendering. Massena launched several sorties, including one led by Soult on 11 May that inflicted losses of 137 killed, 328 wounded, and 1,362 captured on the besiegers. Two days later, a French sortie failed, and Soult was wounded and taken prisoner.

While Genoa was under siege, Elsnitz's corps drove Suchet's weak forces to the west along the Mediterranean coast, taking Albenga on 3 May. Suchet's rearguard held its position too long on 7 May at Montecalvo and was trapped, losing 1,500 prisoners. The Savona fortress capitulated to the Austrians on 15 May. Melas occupied Nice on 11 May. Elsnitz found Suchet's troops in defensive positions along the Var River. On 20 May, the British navy landed heavy artillery to support the Austrian advance. Meanwhile, Melas began receiving disturbing reports about French activities in Switzerland. As early as 8 May, Melas transferred one cavalry and two infantry regiments from Elsnitz to Kaim's forces in the north. On 13 May, Melas left Nice; he took 9,000 troops with him and set out for Turin. From 22 to 27 May, Elsnitz would confront Suchet's defenses along the Var.

== French invasion ==
Sometime in March 1800, as Bonaparte looked over a large map of Piedmont, he asked his secretary Louis Antoine Fauvelet de Bourrienne, "Where shall we beat the Austrians?" When Bourrienne replied that he didn't know, Bonaparte responded by asserting, "Why you idiot, don't you see that as Melas is at Alessandria, and has there his magazines and material, if I cross the Alps at the Great St Bernard I shall cut his communications, and beat him at San Giuliano?" Bourrienne recalled this conversation three months later. San Giuliano is only 3 mi (4.8 km) east of Marengo. After sending word to Massena to hold out until at least 4 June, Bonaparte left Paris and reached Geneva on 8 May.

Berthier was the nominal Commander-in-chief of the Reserve Army and GD Pierre Dupont was its Chief of staff. The army's Chief of Artillery was General of Brigade (GB) Auguste de Marmont who commanded 48 guns. GD Jean Lannes' vanguard included GD François Watrin's division, a brigade led by GB Joseph Mainoni, and a cavalry brigade led by GB Jean Rivaud. The organization of the Reserve Army on 10 May 1800 was as follows.

List of French Reserve Army units on 10 May 1800
Corps	Divisions	Strength
Vanguard	GD Jean Lannes	8,000
GD Guillaume Duhesme	GD Louis Henri Loison	7,000
GD Guillaume Duhesme	GD Jean Boudet	8,000
GD Claude Perrin Victor	GD Jean-Charles Monnier	4,000
GD Claude Perrin Victor	GD Jacques Chambarlhac	6,000
GD Claude Perrin Victor	GD Joseph Chabran	5,000
GD Joachim Murat	Cavalry	4,000
Reserve Army	Grand Total	42,000

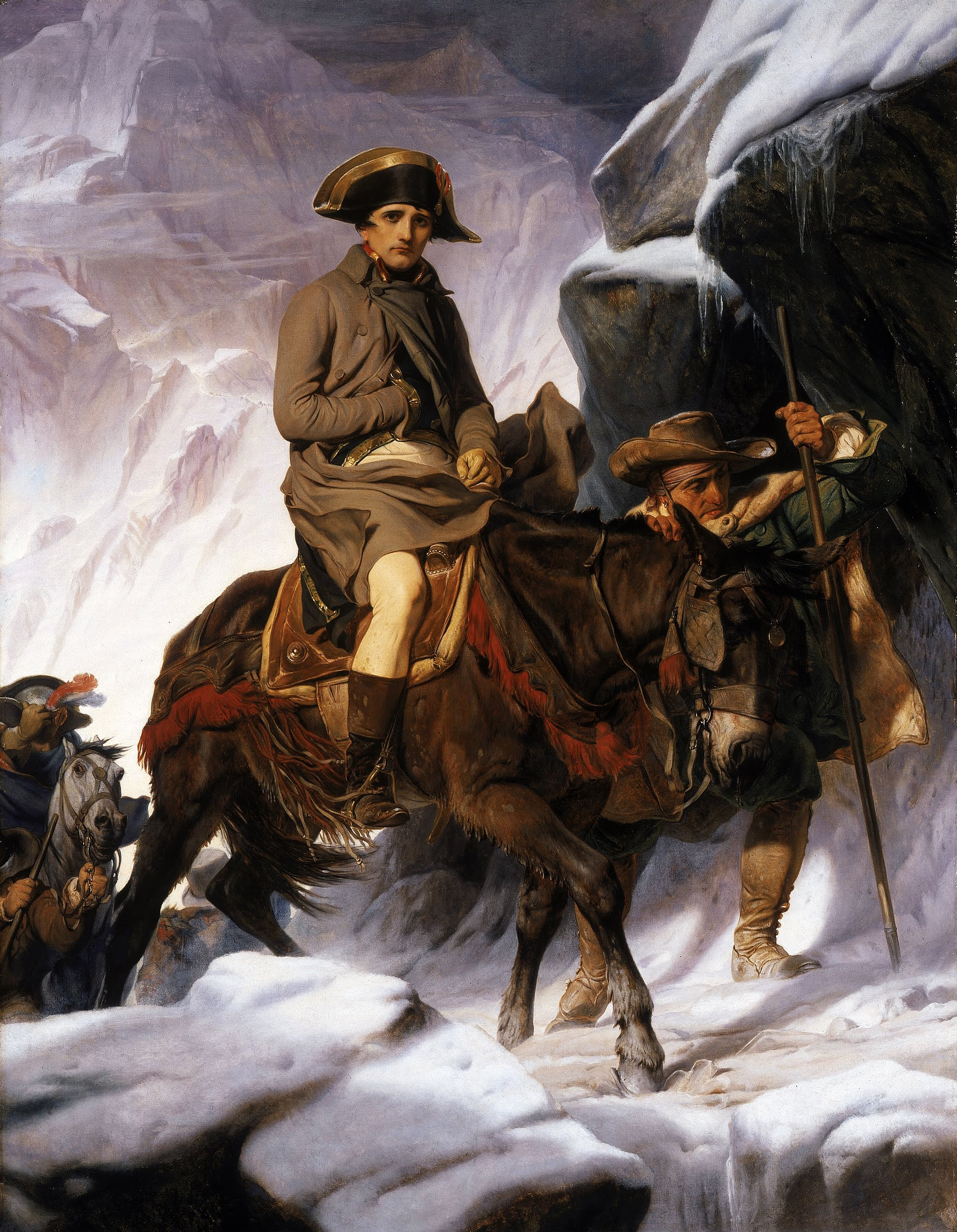
Paul Delaroche's painting accurately depicts Bonaparte crossing the Alps on a mule.

On 25 April 1800, Moreau finally began his operations against Kray's army. In early May, Moreau was victorious at the battles of Stockach, Messkirch, and Biberach, forcing Kray to retreat to Ulm. However, Moreau became reluctant to release Lecourbe's corps. On 13 May 1800, Moreau notified Bonaparte that he could only spare GD Bon-Adrien Jeannot de Moncey leading a smaller corps. Ultimately, Moncey brought 11,500 soldiers into northern Italy via the Gotthard Pass. Aside from Bonaparte's army and Moncey's corps, the French used three other passes in order to confuse the Austrians. Chabran's division utilized the Little St Bernard Pass, Turreau's forces crossed the Mont Cenis Pass, and one demi-brigade used the Simplon Pass.

To oppose the French, Melas had 8,000 troops under FML Josef Philipp Vukassovich at Bellinzona observing the Gotthard Pass, 3,000 men in the Aosta Valley under Generalmajor (GM) Auguste-François Landres de Briey, 5,000 soldiers watching Mont Cenis Pass under Kaim, 1,000 men observing the Stura di Lanzo, 10,000 troops in garrisons in upper Italy, 3,000 soldiers in Tuscany, 3,000 men in Istria, and 6,000 troops en route. The crossing of the Great St Bernard Pass began early on 15 May when Lannes' vanguard set out. The cannons were dragged over the pass in hollowed-out tree trunks. Lannes reached Aosta on 16 May, drove out its small Austrian garrison, and was joined by Chabran's division the following day. Each subsequent division crossed at daily intervals. After Lannes and Chabran, the order of march was Boudet, Loison, Chambarlhac, and Monnier.

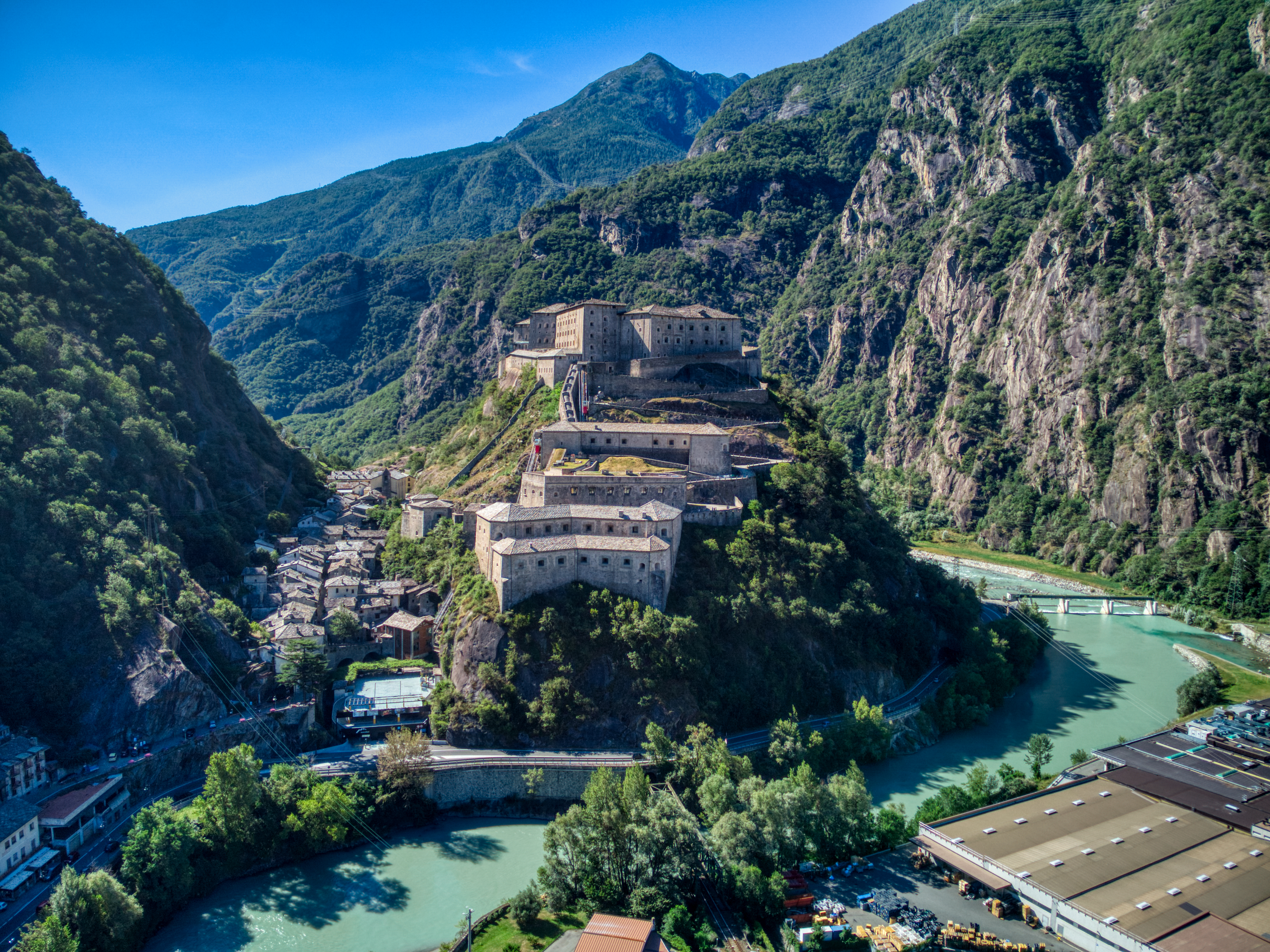
Fort Bard overlooks the road passing along the Aosta Valley.

By 17 May, Lannes had 12,300 infantry, 1,400 cavalry, and 14 artillery pieces under his command in the Aosta Valley. On 18 May there was a clash at Châtillon where Lannes' men captured 350 Austrians and 2 cannons from Briey's brigade at the cost of 90 casualties. On 19 May, the French advance came to a sudden halt where Fort Bard overlooked the main road in a narrow valley. Though Captain Stockard di Bernkopf commanded only 350 soldiers, the fort bristled with 16 large and 26 medium caliber cannons, plus a number of lighter guns. A bombardment on 21 May had no effect on the fort and Bernkopf refused to consider surrendering. Bonaparte crossed the Great St Bernard Pass on 20 May and received the bad news about Fort Bard. Bonaparte was nearly captured by an Austrian patrol on 25 May. Later that day, he ordered an assault on Fort Bard which failed. The next day, the French sneaked two 8-pounders, two 4-pounders, and two howitzers past the fort. Meanwhile, the Reserve Army's infantry and cavalry used steep foot paths to hike around the fort. Chabran's division was assigned to reduce Fort Bard which finally surrendered on 2 June.

== French breakout ==
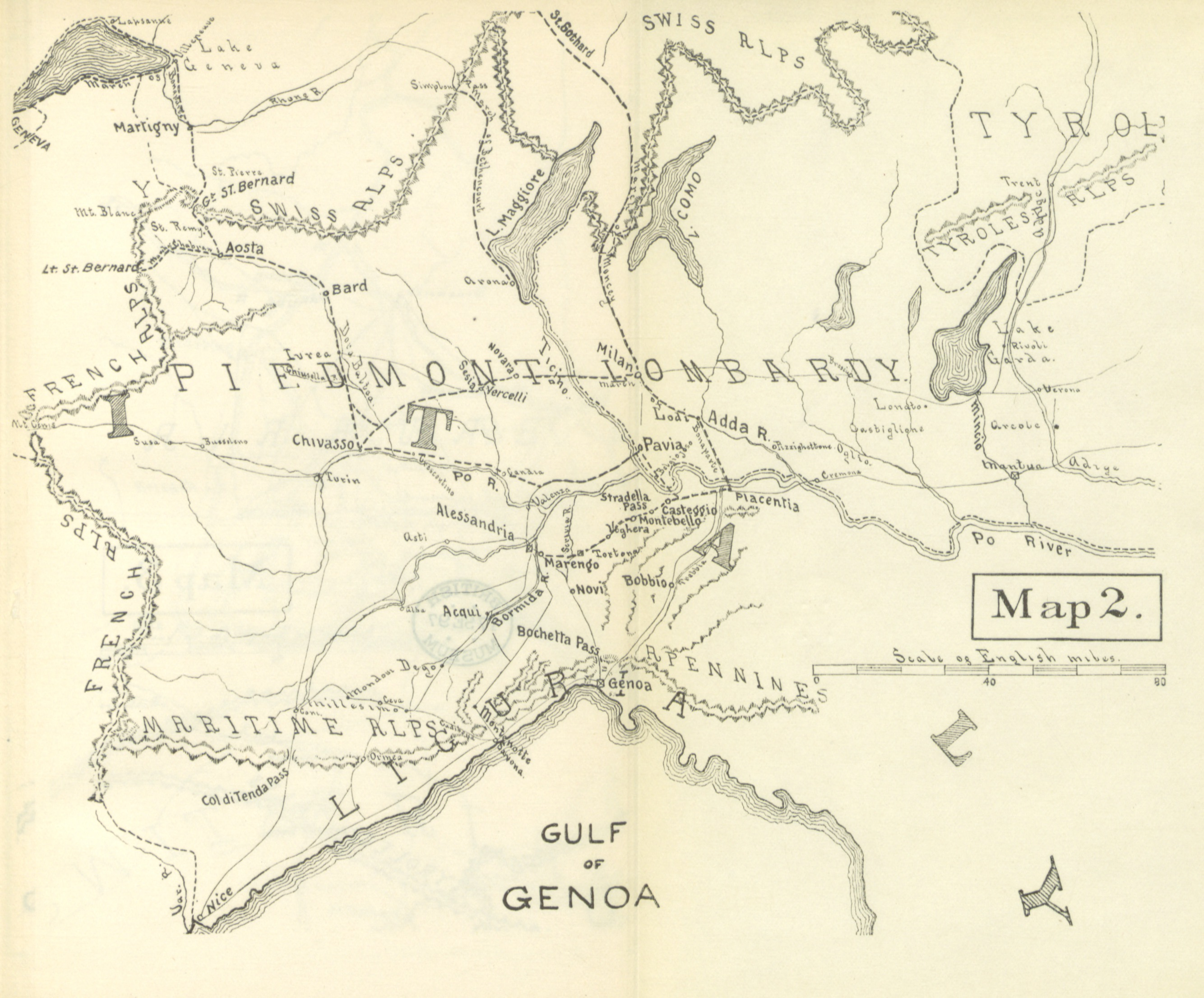
Map displays the 1800 Marengo campaign. The dashed line shows the movements of the French.

On 23 or 24 May 1800, Lannes' vanguard seized Ivrea from Briey's brigade capturing either 300 men and 14 guns from its 800 defenders, or 500 men and 15 guns from its 2,000 defenders. Bonaparte gloated in a letter to his brother Joseph, "We have fallen like a thunderbolt. The enemy did not expect us and still seem scarcely able to believe it." Bonaparte now took GB Giuseppe Lechi's Italian brigade from Lannes' vanguard and sent it east to connect with Moncey's forces. At this time, Lannes was joined by the six artillery pieces that got past Fort Bard. South of Ivrea, FML Karl Joseph Hadik von Futak defended the line of the Chiusella River with either 9,000 or 10,000 troops. On 26 May, Lannes attacked this position with 12,000 soldiers in the Battle of Chiusella River. After a well-fought action in which Austrian GM Joseph Palffy was killed, Hadik's men withdrew toward Turin and Lannes advanced to Chivasso on the Po River. Hadik reported to Melas that he had been attacked by 20,000 men. The French were out of the mountains and in the great plain of the Po Valley.

By 27 May, Melas assembled 18,000 troops at Turin. Melas finally realized that the Reserve Army was at Ivrea after receiving Hadik's report and hearing from a dragoon officer who saw Bonaparte at the Chiusella. He assumed that Lannes' force at Chivasso was the spearhead of the Reserve Army, but it was only a diversion. A conventional general might have first attacked Melas at Turin in an attempt to march directly to the relief of Genoa. Instead, Bonaparte turned his army east toward Milan. By doing so, Bonaparte planned to cut all of Melas' communications with Austria and place the Austrian army in a position where it could be destroyed. Melas had three routes that he could use to retreat. The northernmost ran from Valenza through Pavia on the north bank of the Po. The middle one was on the south bank of the Po through the Stradella defile. The southernmost was from Genoa via Bobbio and Parma.

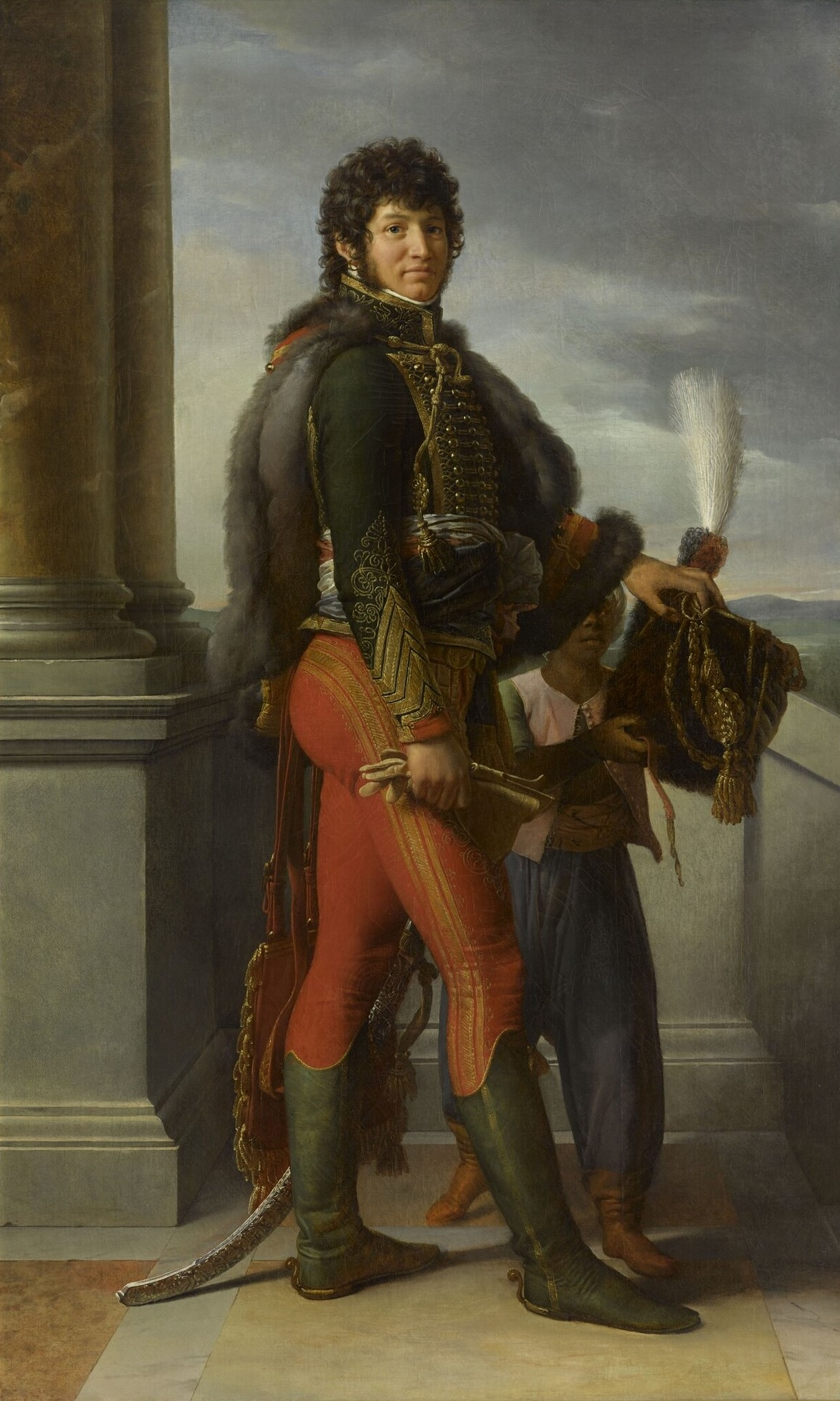
Joachim Murat, 1801

On 28 May 1800, Duhesme led his two-division corps east toward Vercelli. Murat led his cavalry corps and an additional infantry division to the same city by a different route. That day, Moncey finished crossing the Gotthard Pass with the three divisions of GD Jean François Cornu de La Poype, GD Jean Thomas Guillaume Lorge, and GB Jacques Laurent Gilly. On 29 May, Moncey occupied Bellinzona and Murat reached Novara on the Agogna River with his cavalry and the divisions of Boudet and Loison. Defending the Ticino River was GM Johann Ludwig Alexius von Loudon and 5,000 Austrians. On 31 May, Murat's cavalry and Monnier's division attacked Turbigo on the Ticino. At first, Murat crossed the river and captured 1,500 Austrians. However, Laudon's soldiers stoutly defended a canal that ran parallel to the river, holding up Murat for an entire day before withdrawing. At the same time, Duhesme's two divisions (Boudet and Loison) crossed the river at Boffalora sopra Ticino. Laudon was soon joined by Vukassovich. As the Austrians retreated through Milan, Vukassovich detached 2,000 troops to defend the city's citadel, leaving himself with 6,000 men to defend the Adda River.

On 2 June 1800, Murat's forces entered Milan and he assigned his infantry to blockade the citadel. Bonaparte soon arrived and ordered Duhesme to push Vukassovich's division farther to the east. On 3 June, Duhesme's corps lost 60 killed and 200 wounded at the crossing of the Lambro River. On 4 June, Duhesme's troops attacked across the Adda at Lodi. Duhesme soon received orders to send back Boudet's division and advance on Cremona with Loison's division and three cavalry regiments. At a cost of 300 casualties, Loison's men stormed Cremona and seized 200 wagon loads of supplies. Lannes moved from Chivasso to Pavia on 3 June, protecting the right flank of the Reserve Army. Chabran's division was moving from Fort Bard to Chivasso. A new division was formed from 4,000 late-arriving soldiers and assigned to GD Gaspard Amédée Gardanne. Victor with Gardanne and Chambarlhac was marching to Pavia. Murat and Boudet were moving toward Piacenza.

== Genoa and Montebello ==
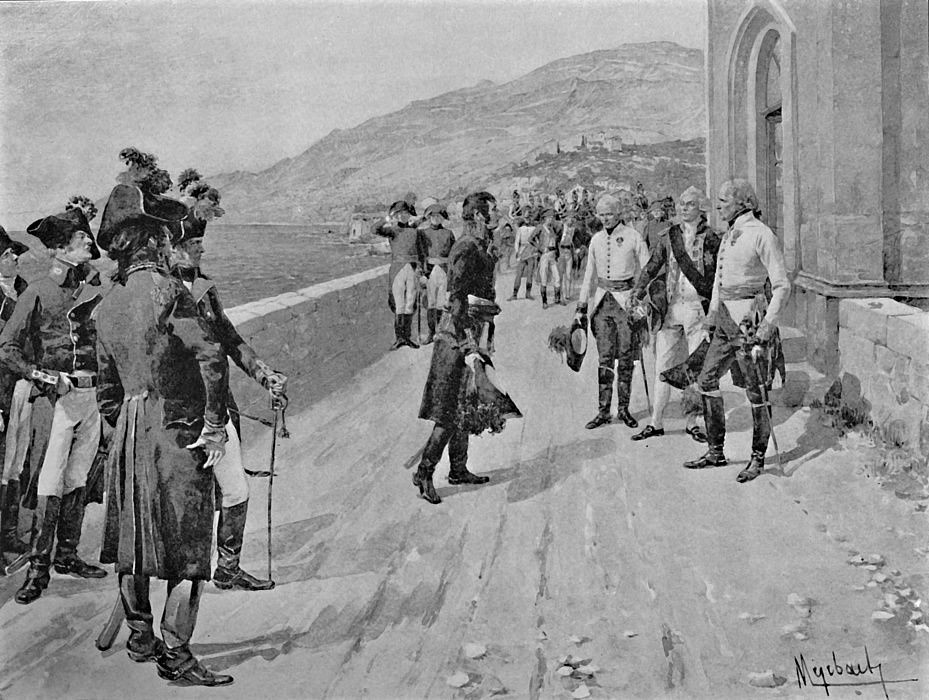
Massena surrendering Genoa to Ott and his generals by Felician Myrbach.

Seeing that his supply lines were threatened, Melas decided to concentrate his army at Alessandria. He ordered Ott to abandon the siege of Genoa and Elsnitz to withdraw from the Var River. After an epic defense, Massena was finally forced to surrender Genoa after hundreds of French soldiers and civilians began dying of starvation. Not knowing that Ott had already been ordered to give up the siege, Massena began negotiations on 2 June. Massena demanded that his surrendered troops be allowed to fight after entering French lines, and that his sick soldiers be shipped home on British vessels. Ott agreed to those terms on 4 June. Of the 7,000 French who marched out, 6,000 were unfit for combat, and 4,000 more soldiers required medical attention. Ott installed Hohenzollern with a strong garrison in Genoa and marched his corps over the Bocchetta Pass to join Melas. Elsnitz started out with 17,000 troops but his withdrawal was very poorly managed from the start. Elsnitz abandoned 800 sick men and many cannons at Nice, and his soldiers began to desert. Suchet, who had been reinforced to a strength of 12,000 men, conducted a very aggressive pursuit. Guessing that Elsnitz would retreat via the Col de Tende, Suchet got his troops there first, forcing the Austrians to fall back through Ormea. By 7 June, Elsnitz's corps numbered only 8,000 men. Suchet claimed to have captured 7,000 Austrians, 30 guns, and 6 flags.

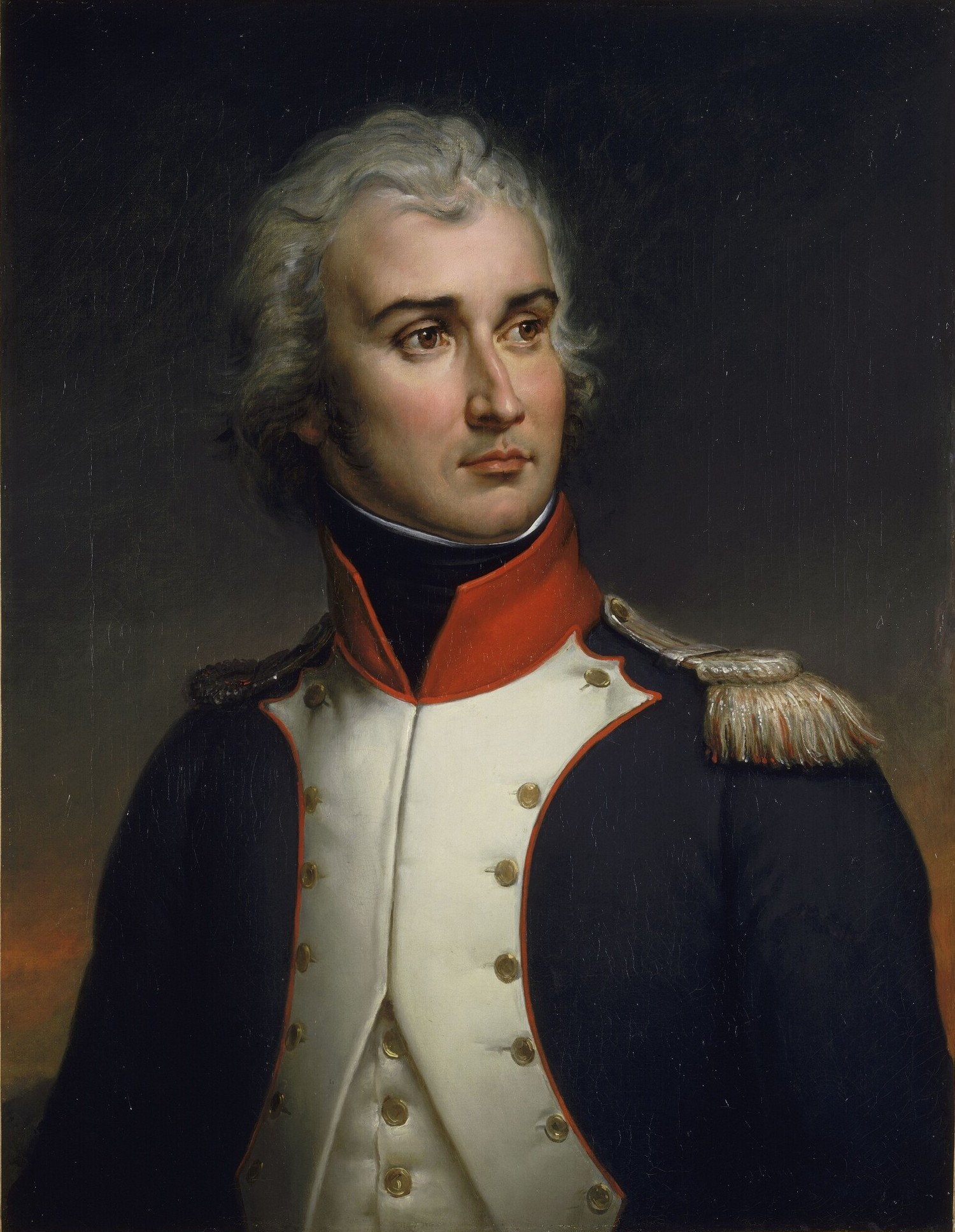
Jean Lannes

On the evening of 3 June, Lannes' vanguard charged into Pavia, capturing 2,000 hospitalized Austrian soldiers and many military supplies. Bonaparte ordered Lannes to cross to the south bank of the Po and seize the Stradella defile. At the same time, he ordered Murat and Boudet to cross the Po at Piacenza. After concentrating his army at Alessandria, Melas planned to move east to Piacenza, then strike north. He ordered FML Andreas O'Reilly von Ballinlough to move his 3,000-man division east through the Stradella defile to secure the city of Piacenza which was a supply base. Melas also sent his reserve artillery and an additional brigade from Ott's command. After failing to cross at Piacenza on 5 June, Murat and Boudet crossed the Po downstream and entered the city the following day. While marching toward Piacenza on 6 June, O'Reilly found that Lannes crossed the river behind him. After a confused series of actions, O'Reilly saved the reserve artillery convoy, but had to withdraw to the west.

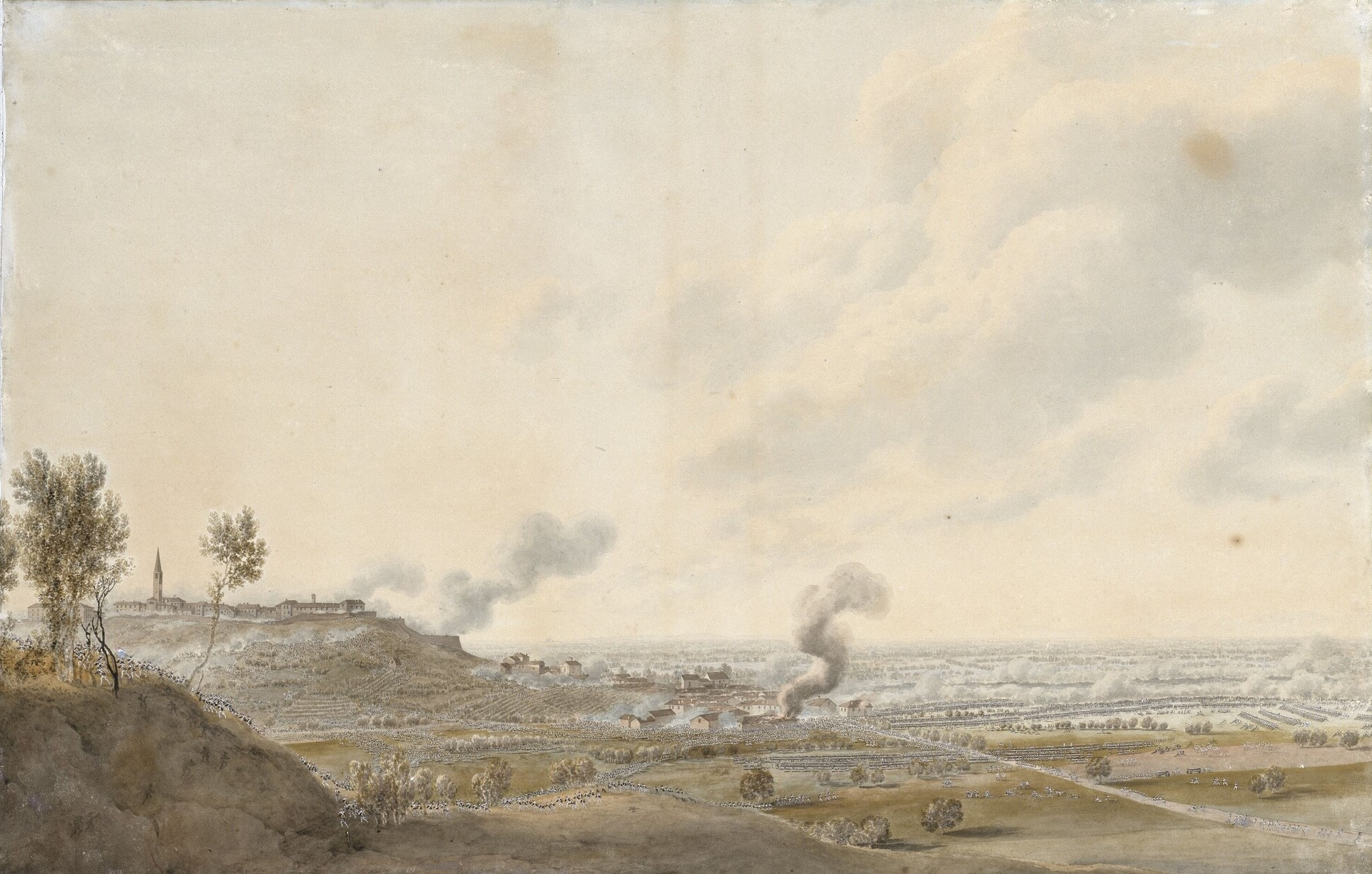
Battle of Montebello, 9 June 1800

At night on 7 June at Milan, Bourrienne interrupted Bonaparte's tryst with an opera diva to tell him that Murat's cavalry intercepted a message that Genoa had fallen. Bonaparte immediately realized that Ott's corps had been freed for operations against the French and he began to issue new instructions. Underestimating Austrian strength in the area, Bonaparte ordered Lannes to attack any force that he encountered because, "they are, certainly, fewer than 10,000 men." Meanwhile Ott's corps reached Novi on 7 June and occupied Voghera late on 8 June. When Watrin's division of Lannes' vanguard found O'Reilly's division drawn up at Casteggio early on 9 June, he attacked to start the Battle of Montebello. At the moment, Lannes' 7,000 men were grossly outnumbered by Ott's 18,000 Austrians. Melas' chief of staff GM Anton von Zach told Ott to avoid combat, but Ott rejected that advice. About 1:00 pm, Victor arrived on the field with the 5,000 men of Chambarlhac's division while Gardanne's division was still crossing the Po River. Ott eventually conceded the field to the French, withdrawing to Alessandria after leaving 2,000 men to garrison Tortona. Ott admitted losing 659 killed and 1,445 wounded, plus 2,171 men and 2 guns captured. French casualties may have reached 3,000.

On 6 June 1800, Moncey's corps arrived at Milan. Gilly was assigned to blockade the Austrian garrison in Milan's citadel. Lorge's division was sent east beyond the Oglio River. La Poype's division was ordered to the north bank of the Po at Valenza to block that possible Austrian escape route. On 9 June, Murat and Boudet were at Piacenza, Monnier was at Stradella, Loison was at Cremona, and Chabran was at Vercelli. By blocking all of Melas' lines of communication, Bonaparte spread his army to a dangerous degree. On 10 June, Melas arrived at Alessandria with the troops that marched from Turin. Also on 10 June, GD Louis Desaix arrived at Stradella and Bonaparte assigned him a corps containing the divisions of Boudet and Monnier. Victor's corps comprised the divisions of Gardanne and Chambarlhac. Duhesme's corps included the divisions of Loison and Chabran. Turreau's division was approaching Turin with 5,100 men and Suchet's corps was nearing Acqui only 18 mi (29 km) southwest of Alessandria. On 12 June, the French army began to cross the Scrivia River, closing in on Alessandria from the east. That day, the long-awaited 41-gun artillery convoy arrived from Fort Bard.

== Marengo ==
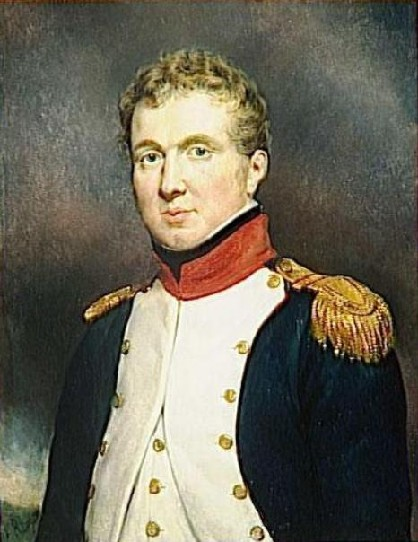
Claude Victor

Late on 13 June, Victor with Gardanne's division attacked Marengo and drove out O'Reilly's division after a lackluster defense, capturing two 4-pounder cannons. Bonaparte was apparently convinced that Melas' abandonment of the Scrivia plain meant that the Austrian army was only intent on escape. At hand, the French had Victor's two divisions at Marengo, the soldiers of Lannes and Murat were behind Victor, and Monnier and the Consular Guard were at Bonaparte's headquarters. Desaix with Boudet's division had been sent toward Novi. Including Boudet, the French army counted 26,029 infantry, 3,851 cavalry, and 493 gunners supported by 35 artillery pieces.

In fact, Melas and Zach determined to attack the French army at dawn on 14 June. The Austrians had spread much of their strength in large garrisons for Genoa (5,800), Cuneo (4,390), Turin (3,860), Milan (2,816), and other lesser fortresses. These soldiers would be unavailable for battle. Worse, Melas also assigned 3,000 men to garrison Alessandria's citadel, subtracting them from his field army. Altogether, the Austrian army numbered 24,073 infantry and 7,543 cavalry supported by 92 artillery pieces, not including battalion guns. From this force, at 9:00 am, Melas would send away an entire 2,341-man hussar brigade on a fool's errand to intercept Suchet.

About 6:00 am on 14 June 1800, the Austrian army began to slowly emerge from its bridgehead on the east bank of the Bormida (river) Since O'Reilly's division defended the bridgehead, it was the first Austrian unit to attack the French in the Battle of Marengo. Because it was such a cramped position, the Austrian deployment was time-consuming. Behind O'Reilly were the divisions of Hadik, Kaim, and the grenadiers under FML Ferdinand Johann von Morzin. Elsnitz's cavalry division was in reserve. Colonel Johann Maria Philipp Frimont's brigade-sized advance guard attacked Gardanne's outposts near Pietrabuona farm around 7:00 am. Soon, O'Reilly's division took position on Frimont's right. Victor ordered Gardanne to hold his advanced position so that the other French units had time to form their lines properly.

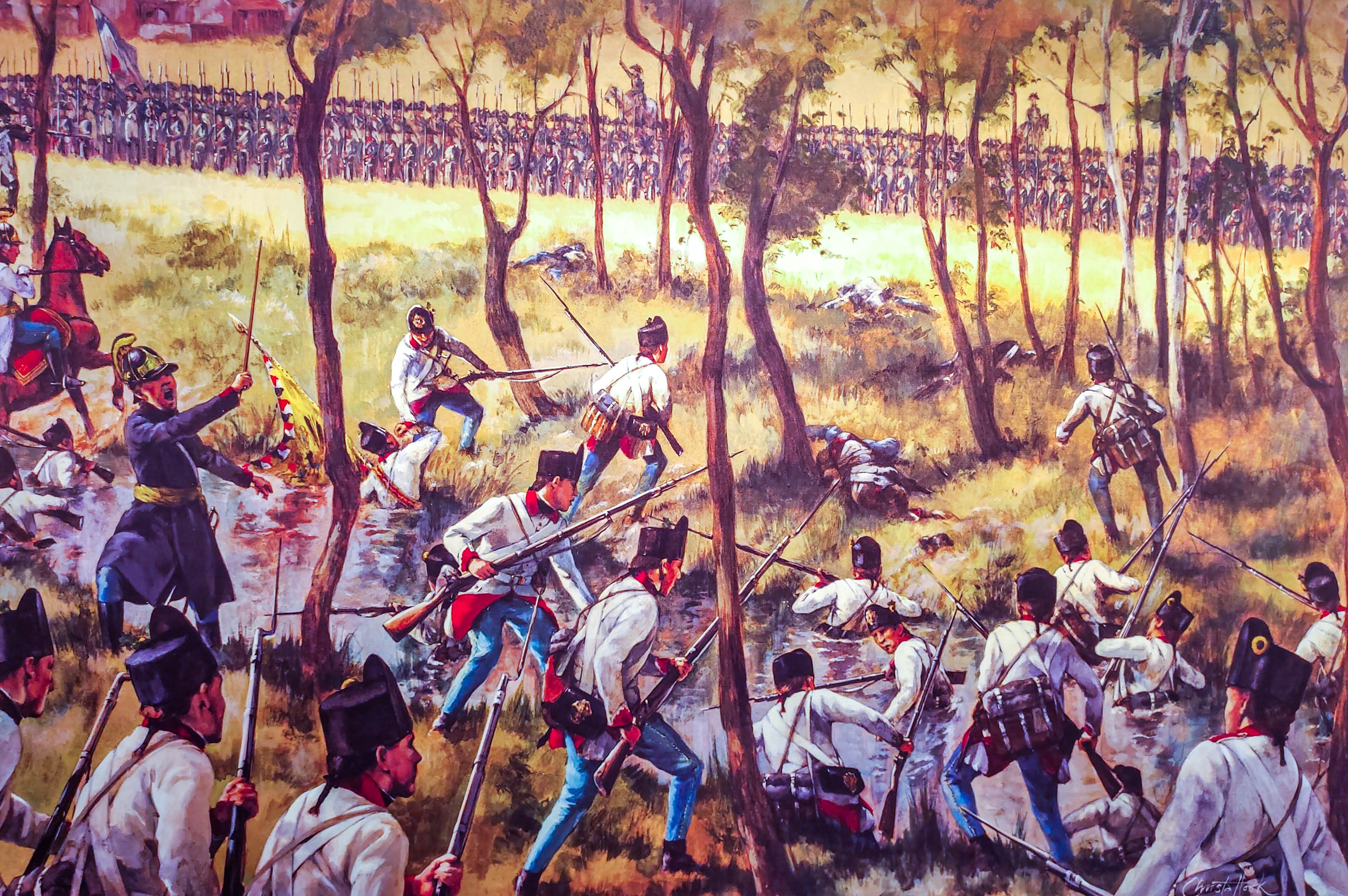
Austrian soldiers waded across Fontanone Creek to attack Victor's lines.

Gardanne's division held its forward position until 10:00 am when Victor pulled it back behind Fontanone Creek. Chambarlhac's division was soon deployed to hold Marengo and Lannes with Watrin's division formed on its right flank. Hadik's division hammered at Marengo and it was joined by Kaim's division and the grenadier brigade of GM Christoph von Lattermann. The French infantry managed to halt the Austrian assaults. Bonaparte sent a frantic message to Desaix, recalling him and Boudet's division. At noon, GM Giovanni Pilati's dragoon brigade attempted to turn the French left flank, but it was smashed by GB François Étienne de Kellermann's heavy cavalry brigade and the 8th Dragoon Regiment. At the same hour, Ott's two divisions began to turn the French right flank. At 2:00 pm, Victor and Lannes finally abandoned Marengo and the line of Fontanone Creek. The French fell back slowly, harassed by cavalry and pounded by artillery. Monnier's division and the Consular Guard arrived and were committed to stop Ott's advance, but they were also forced to retreat. Meanwhile, O'Reilly's entire division became absorbed in pursuing and capturing a detachment of 300–400 French soldiers at Cassina Bianca.

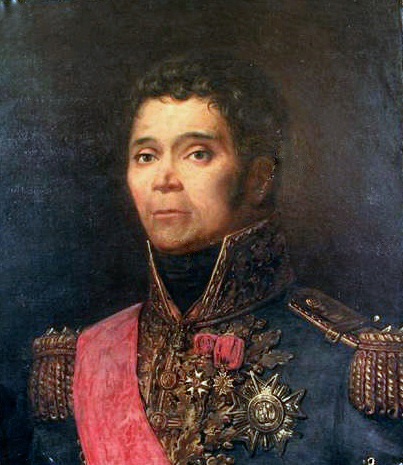
François Kellermann

At 3:00 pm, Melas quit the battlefield and appointed Kaim to lead the pursuit. The elderly Austrian commander nursed an arm injury that occurred when a horse was killed under him. Time was wasted while Kaim reorganized the army into a ponderous column. Its vanguard consisted of GM Franz Xaver Saint-Julien's brigade with Lattermann's grenadiers in support and the Liechtenstein Dragoon Regiment Nr. 9 on its left flank. Farther back was Kaim's main body. Ott's corps advanced on the left and O'Reilly's division was on the right. Sometime around 5:00 pm, Desaix with Boudet's division finally appeared on the field. Marmont massed his 18 remaining artillery pieces into a single battery and blasted Saint-Julien's troops. Boudet's 9th Light Infantry Regiment attacked and drove back Saint-Julien's brigade which reformed behind the grenadiers. Boudet's other two regiments deployed on the 9th Light's right flank and they all advanced. After Lattermann's grenadiers fired a volley, Kellermann's heavy cavalry crashed into their left flank and Boudet's men attacked them in front. In the general collapse that followed, Zach was captured along with 2,000 Austrian soldiers. Joined by more cavalry under Murat, Kellermann's troopers routed the Liechtenstein Dragoons. The panic spread to Kaim's main body when fleeing Austrian cavalry stampeded through their ranks. Ott and O'Reilly managed to withdraw their troops in good order, but Marengo was abandoned to the French.

== Aftermath ==
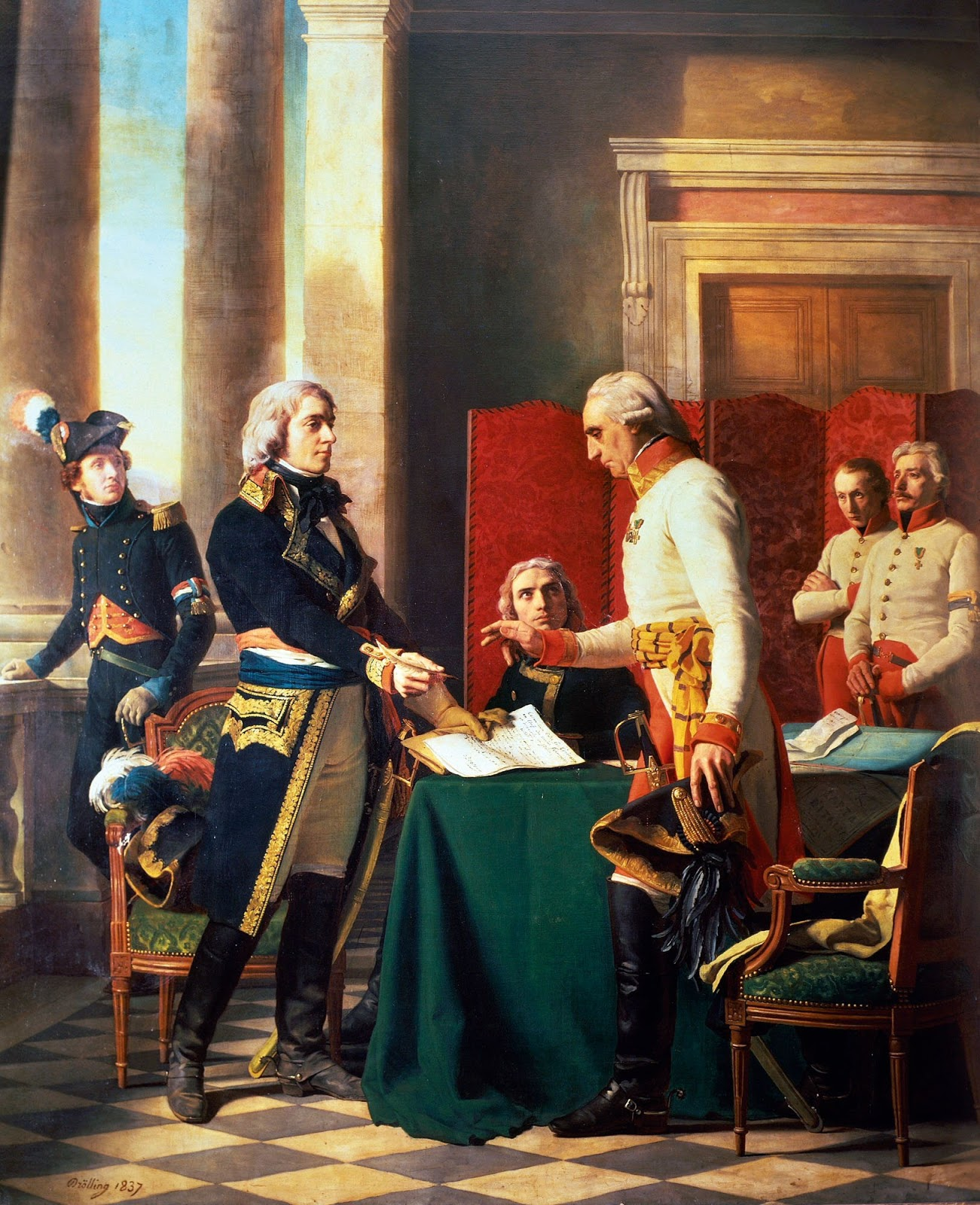
Melas is shown signing the Convention of Alessandria.

Bonaparte attempted to gloss over French losses by reporting 700-800 killed, 2,000 wounded, and 1,100 prisoners. The divisions of Gardanne and Boudet never reported their losses, but Watrin's division alone reported over 2,000 casualties. Historian Édouard Gachot estimated French losses as 7,700 which Arnold suggested may be too low. Desaix was killed, GB Pierre Champeaux was fatally wounded, Boudet and five generals of brigade were wounded. The Austrians reported losing 9,416 men killed, wounded, or captured, and 13 artillery pieces. However, a more realistic estimate would be 11,000 casualties. Hadik was mortally wounded and five generalmajors were wounded.

After the battle, a badly shaken Melas called a council of war in which the assembled generals decided to ask for terms. At 4:00 am on 15 June, three Austrian officers appeared at the French outposts under a flag of truce. Bonaparte demanded an immediate surrender. Melas delegated Adam Albert von Neipperg and Johann I Joseph, Prince of Liechtenstein to negotiate terms. They were soon joined by Zach, a French prisoner. Having fought so long to capture Genoa, Melas was reluctant to give it up, but Bonaparte was adamant. At 10:00 pm, Melas signed the Convention of Alessandria. The Austrian army was permitted to withdraw intact to the east bank of the Mincio River, which would become the boundary between Austrian and French territory. All Austrian territory west of the river was handed over to the French. The war would not resume until each side had a ten-day notice. The Austrians pledged not to detach troops from Italy to Germany. The Austrians were compelled to evacuate the fortresses of Alessandria, Arona, Ceva, Cuneo, Genoa, Milan, Piacenza, Pizzighettone, Savona, Tortona, and Turin.
