= Siege of Genoa (1800) =

1800 siege of the War of the Second Coalition

- Part of the Marengo campaign of the War of the Second Coalition
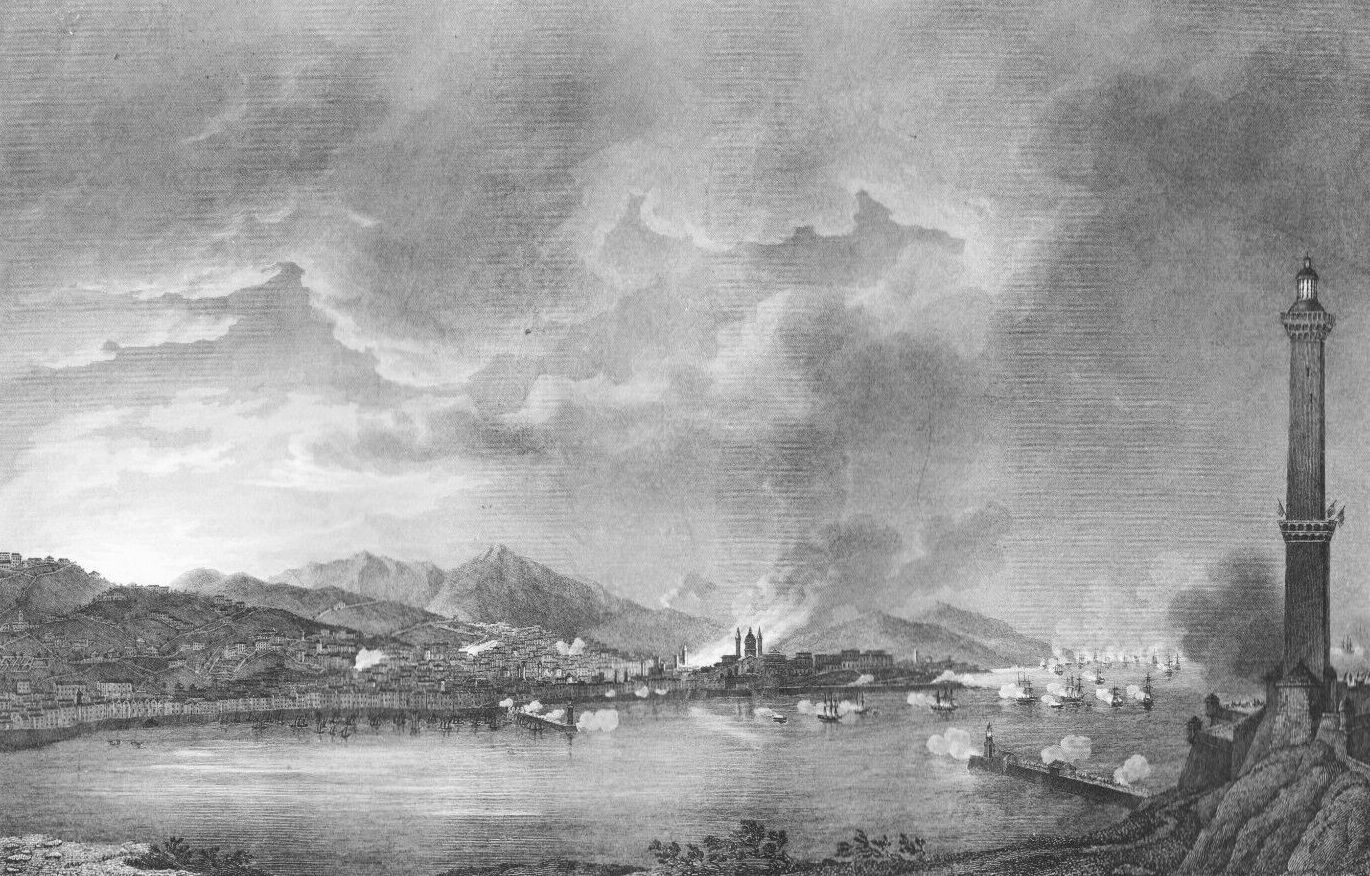
- The Royal Navy bombarding Genoa on 20 May 1800 during the siege
Date	19 April – 4 June 1800
Location	Genoa, Ligurian Republic 44°24′40″N 8°55′48″E
Result	Anglo-Austrian victory

Belligerents
France; Liguria	Habsburg monarchy Great Britain

Commanders and leaders
(French First Republic) André Masséna (French First Republic) Jean-de-Dieu Soult	(Habsburg monarchy) Michael von Melas; (Habsburg monarchy) Peter Karl Ott; (Kingdom of Great Britain) Lord Keith

Strength
12,000	24,000; 1 ship of the line 2 frigates 1 brig-sloop 1 cutter

Casualties and losses
Siege: 4,000–8,000; Campaign: 14,000	Siege: 6,000–6,500; Campaign: 20,000
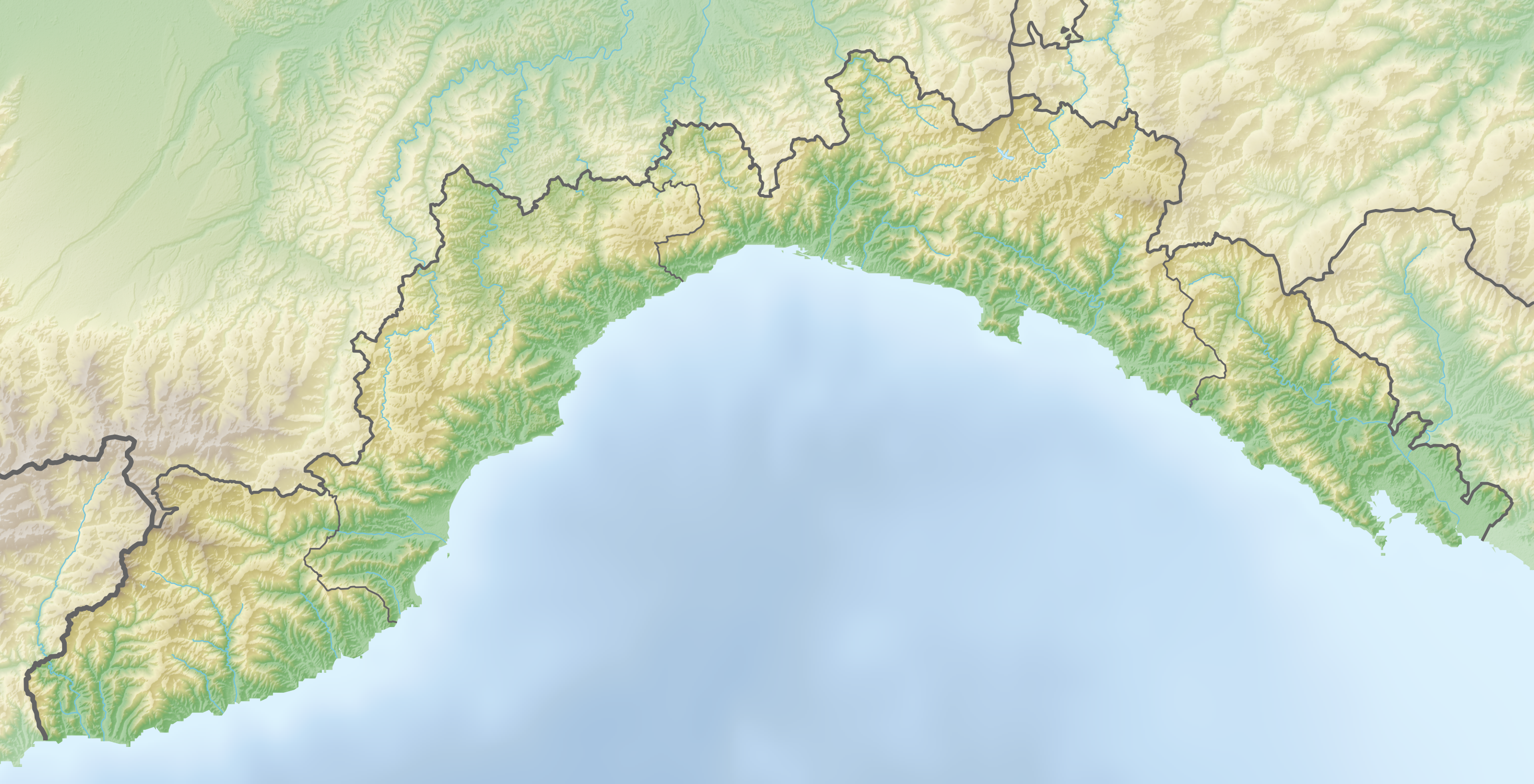
- Location within Liguria Siege of Genoa (1800) (Italy)

War of the Second Coalition:
Italy
current battle
Napoleon in command
Napoleon not in command

The siege of Genoa saw an Austrian army led by Michael von Melas besiege the port of Genoa, which was occupied by a French garrison under the command of André Massena, from 19 April to 4 June 1800. It formed part of the larger Marengo campaign during the War of the Second Coalition. The Austrian army isolated Massena and half of the French army in Genoa, while driving the other half from the area. Once Genoa was under siege, Massena conducted a very active defense with frequent sorties. Besieged on land by 24,000 Austrian troops led by Peter Karl Ott von Bátorkéz and at sea by a Royal Navy squadron under Vice-Admiral of the Red Lord Keith, famine reduced the defenders to starvation. By the time Massena surrendered the city on 4 June, thousands of Genoa's inhabitants had died of starvation or disease. While the Austrian army was focused on the siege, a French army under Napoleon invaded Italy from the northwest, winning a major victory at the Battle of Marengo.

== Background ==
In early 1799, the French Directory deployed the Army of Italy under GD Barthélemy Louis Joseph Schérer in northern Italy and the 32,010-strong Army of Naples led by GD Étienne Macdonald at Rome and Naples. Because of mismanagement by the Directory, Schérer was left with only 43,000 men in his field army to face a 50,700-man Austrian army commanded by FML Paul Kray. Meanwhile, a 24,551-strong Russian army under Field Marshal Alexander Suvorov was on the march to Italy. The drawn Battle of Verona on 26 March was followed by the French defeat at the Battle of Magnano on 5 April 1799. After Magnano, Schérer left 12,000 men to hold Mantua and began a headlong retreat to the Adda River.

Schérer was replaced in command by GD Jean Victor Marie Moreau but the French were beaten at the Battle of Cassano on 27–28 April 1799. MacDonald was badly defeated at the Battle of Trebbia on 17–20 June. The defeats continued with the surrender of Mantua on 28 July, the Battle of Novi on 15 August, and the Battle of Genola on 4 November. By the end of 1799, the French hold on Italian territory had shrunk to what it was when Bonaparte took command of the army in April 1796. The Army of Italy commander GD Jean-Étienne Championnet wanted to abandon Genoa, but the Directory refused to allow this. On 9 January 1800, Championnet died of disease and was replaced by André Massena.

On 9 October 1799, GD Napoleon Bonaparte returned to France from Egypt and entered into a conspiracy to overthrow the unpopular Directory. The Coup of 18 Brumaire (9 November 1799) was successful and on 25 December, Bonaparte became First Consul, a position in which he held dictatorial power. On 25 January 1800, Bonaparte ordered GD Louis-Alexandre Berthier to assemble a 60,000-man Reserve Army at Dijon. The Austrian government was completely fooled by French countermeasures and did not realize that the Reserve Army represented a serious threat.

== Plans ==
Massena's Army of Italy had only 36,000 men available for the field. In January 1800, there were 14,000 men sick in the hospital. Many units were in a state of mutiny because the soldiers were not being fed properly; hundreds of men deserted. Massena assigned 4,000 soldiers under GD Louis Marie Turreau to defend the Mont Cenis pass west of Turin. GD Sextius Alexandre François de Miollis with 8,000 troops garrisoned Genoa, GD Jean-de-Dieu Soult with 12,000 men held the Bocchetta Pass, and GD Louis-Gabriel Suchet with 12,000 soldiers defended the Col de Tende and Nice. Soult's corps included divisions led by Miollis, GD Honoré Gazan, and GD Jean-Antoine Marbot, while Suchet's corps consisted of four small divisions under GDs Bertrand Clauzel, Jean Pierre Pouget, Pierre Dominique Garnier, and Philippe Romain Ménard.

For 1800, the Austrian government planned for the army in Italy under Michael von Melas to take the offensive first. After Melas pressed forward, the French would be compelled to reinforce their Italian army by sending help from their army along the Rhine River. This would provide a chance for the Austrian army in Germany under Paul Kray (promoted to Feldzeugmeister) to invade France by striking through the Belfort Gap. Melas assigned FML Konrad Valentin von Kaim and 31,000 troops to watch the Alpine passes to the north and west. Another 20,000 men garrisoned various strongpoints in northern Italy. Melas with 62,000 men moved against Genoa in three concentric columns. FML Peter Ott advanced up the Trebbia River, FML Prince Friedrich Hohenzollern moved up the Scrivia River, and Melas attacked the French center. Ott led 8,000 men and Hohenzollern commanded 5,300 men. Melas split his force in two, personally leading 27,500 troops while FML Anton von Elsnitz led 21,100 soldiers. (Note: Another authority stated that Melas' column had 40,000 troops, Hohenzollern 10,000, and Ott 15,000 (Dodge, p. 169).)

== Operations ==
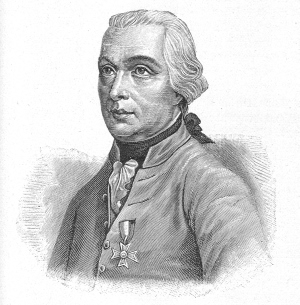
Michael von Melas

Melas' offensive began on 4 April 1800, as he strove to seize the coastal highway, cutting the Army of Italy in two. On 6 April at Cadibona, the 13,000 Austrians of FML Karl Joseph Hadik von Futak's division from Melas' column defeated Marbot's 3,800-man division. French losses were 200 killed and wounded plus 500 men and 5 guns captured. French General of Brigade (GB) Jean-Mathieu Seras was captured. There were 200 Austrian casualties. On 7 April, Massena with 5,000 men surprised the 7,000 Austrians of Ott's division at Monte Fasce. The French inflicted 58 killed, 178 wounded, and 1,400 captured on their opponents while sustaining only 200 casualties. Far to the northwest at Monte Cenis on 8 April, an Austrian raid on Turreau's division surprised and captured the French 15th Light Infantry Regiment in a body. The French lost 1,344 and 14 guns captured. On 9 April at the Bochetta Pass, Hohenzollern and 10,000 Austrians defeated 3,500 soldiers from Gazan's division, inflicting 1,000 casualties on the French. The Austrians lost 600 casualties.

Leaving 8,000 soldiers to defend Genoa, Massena and Soult attacked toward the west, while Suchet's troops pressed to the east. For ten days, the French fought desperately to reconnect the two halves of the Army of Italy. Melas kept his composure and was able to hold his central position, though his troops suffered casualties of 276 officers and 8,037 rank and file between 6 and 19 April. The French lost an estimated 7,000 men. The major actions were at Sassello on 10 April, Monte Settepani on 10–11 April, Veirera on 11–12 April, Colle di San Giacomo on 12 April, and Voltri on 18 April. At Monte Settepani, Suchet captured 1,200 Austrians by attacking during a fog. By 19 April, Melas pushed Massena's forces within Genoa's defenses and placed the city under siege.

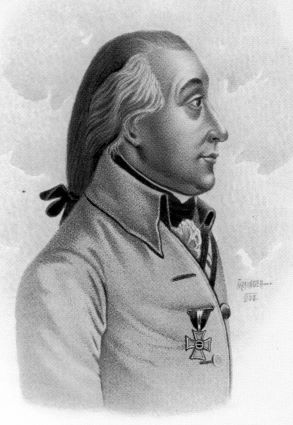
Peter Karl Ott

Melas assigned 24,000 soldiers to Ott in order to carry out the siege. Meanwhile, Melas accompanied the 28,000 Austrians under Elsnitz as they pursued Suchet's 10,000 Frenchmen along the coast. On 3 May 1800, Elsnitz's troops occupied Albenga where the French hurriedly spiked their cannons before leaving. On 7 May, Elsnitz scored a coup at Montecalvo when the French rearguard held its position too long. While both sides lost 200 men killed and wounded, the Austrians also captured 1,500 Frenchmen. Savona's 1,100-strong French garrison surrendered on 15 May. Suchet finally stopped retreating at the Var River where his chief of engineers GB Jacques Campredon constructed a fortified bridgehead on the east bank. Faced with strong fortifications, Elsnitz halted and began siege approaches on 22 May.

On 14 May, Bonaparte's Army of Reserve began crossing the Great St Bernard Pass into northwestern Italy. By 16 May, its vanguard under GD Jean Lannes reached Aosta where it joined GD Joseph Chabran's division which crossed the Little St Bernard Pass. On 23 May, Lannes captured Ivrea despite a hold-up at Fort Bard. Hadik with 3,000 troops was near Ivrea and Kaim with 5,000 soldiers was watching the Mont Cenis pass. FML Josef Philipp Vukassovich with 10,000 Austrians was located farther east. Worried about reports coming from the north, Melas left Elsnitz with 17,000 Austrians on the Var River and marched with 9,000 men to Turin which he reached on 25 May. Melas still did not realize that the main French threat was coming from the Great St Bernard Pass.

== Siege ==
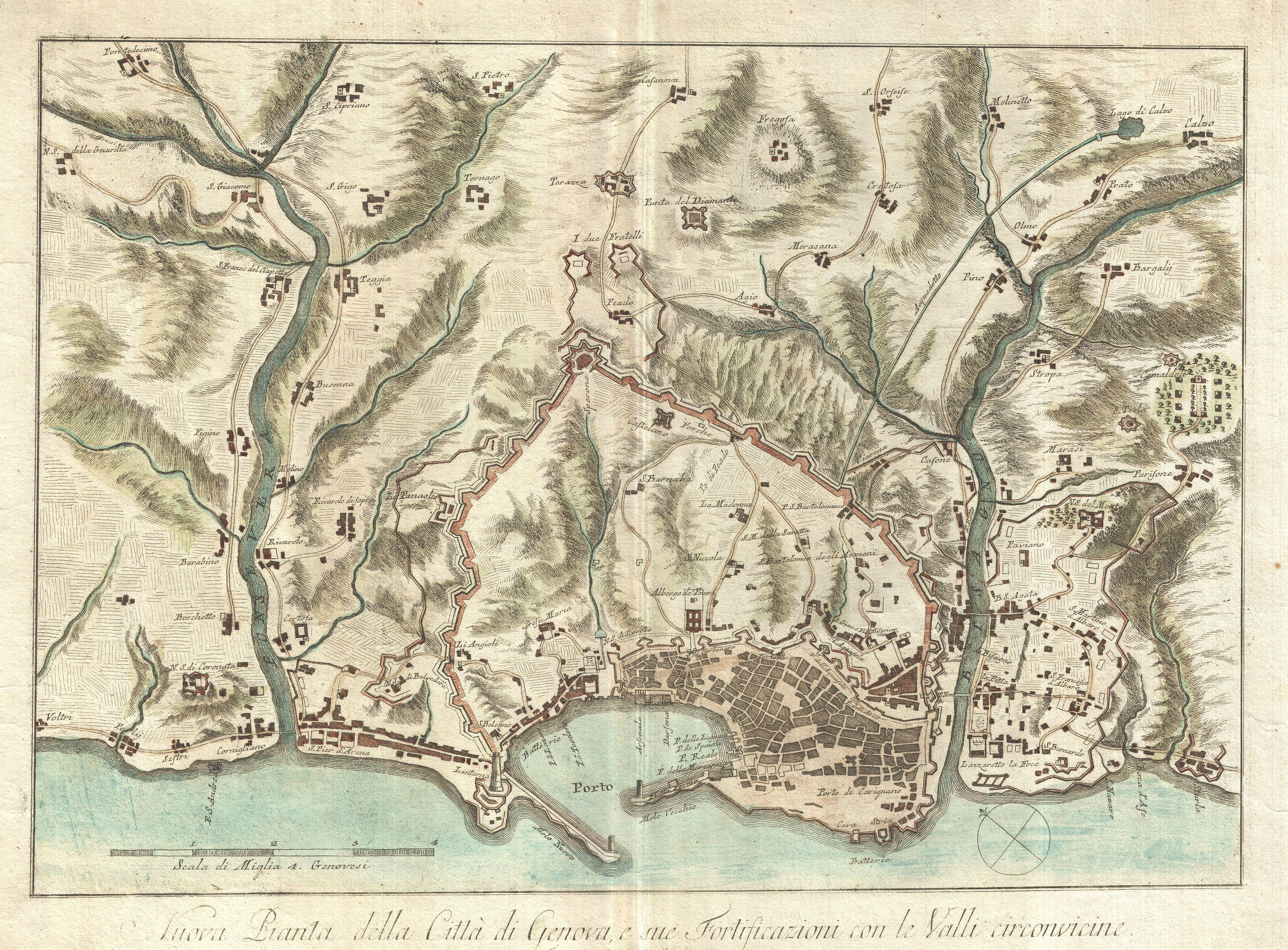
Map shows Genoa and its fortifications in 1800.

Genoa lay within a triangle in which two of the sides were formed by fortified ridges and the third side was the Mediterranean Sea. On 21 April 1800, Massena had 12,000 men fit to defend Genoa, with another 16,000 too sick to fight. Even before the siege began, the French defenders were reduced to eating poor-quality bread and the last of the horse meat. On 24 April, Melas demanded the surrender of Genoa, which was refused by Massena. Showing that he trusted Ott to carry out the siege, Melas then left to join Elsnitz's corps. The siege was supported by a British squadron under Vice-Admiral of the Red Lord Keith which comprised HMS Minotaur, Phoenix, Mondovi, Entreprenante and the tender Victoire. According to James R. Arnold, Genoa's population was 70,000. Theodore Ayrault Dodge asserted the Genoa's population was 150,000. Andrew Roberts stated that Genoa had 160,000 inhabitants of whom 30,000 would die of starvation or disease during the siege.

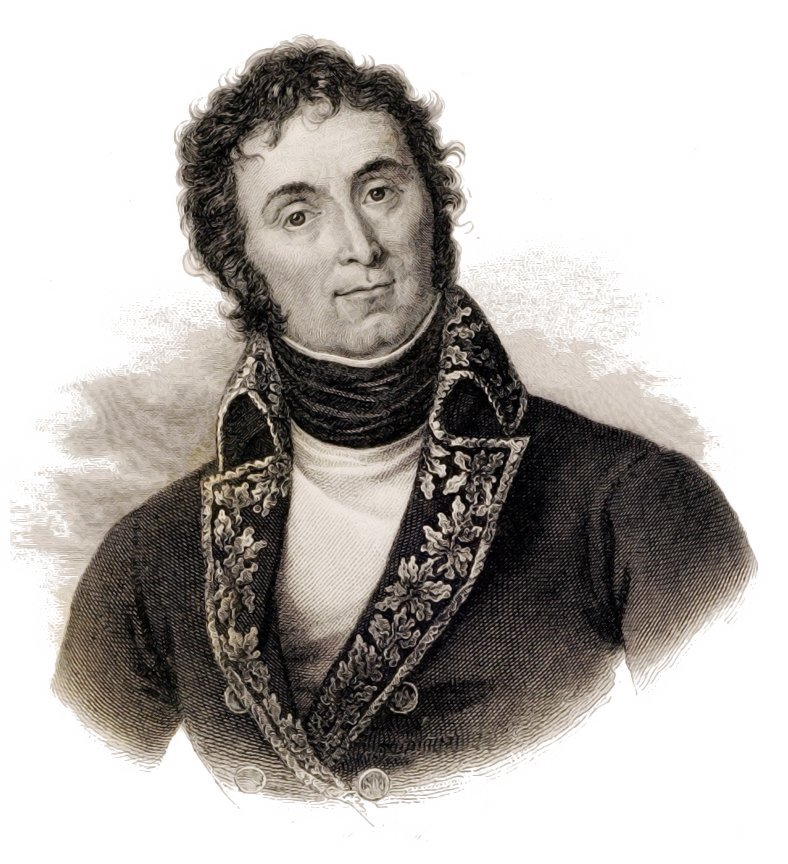
André Massena

On 30 April in the pre-dawn hours, Ott tried to capture Genoa by storm. At the same time British gunboats bombarded coastal forts. The assault on the Deux-Frères redoubt on Monte due Fratelli was led by Generalmajor (GM) Nikolaus Pálffy ab Erdöd. The Infantry Regiments Alvinczi Nr. 19 and Kray Nr. 34 captured the redoubt, driving off the French 24th Line Infantry Demi-Brigade. Colonel Johann Maria Philipp Frimont's troops seized another fort and captured 350 men from the 78th Line. The Austrian troops became disorganized, and their commanders were not prepared for the vigor of the French response. Massena ordered grenadiers to retake the Deux-Frères which was done by mid-morning. Massena then organized a series of afternoon counterattacks, including one that rescued Colonel Georges Mouton, commander of the 3rd Line. On 1 May, Massena's attacks continued until the French regained their key positions. The two-day battle cost the Austrians 3,147 casualties against 1,526 French casualties. Since Ott's coup de main failed, the Austrian general resolved to starve out the defenders.

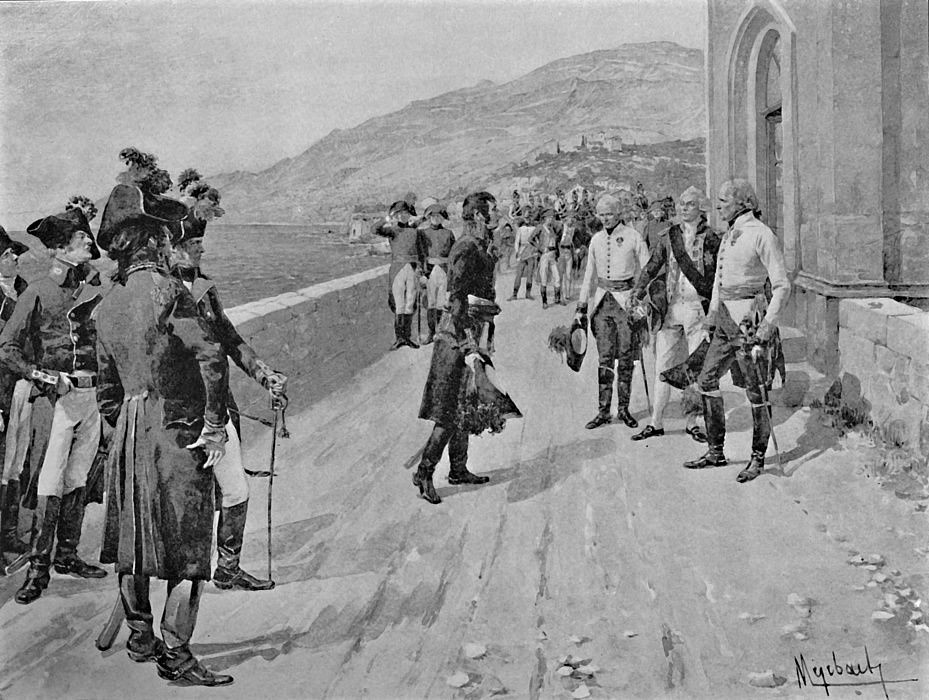
Myrbach print shows Massena surrendering Genoa to Ott and his generals.

On 2 May 1800, Colonel Honoré Charles Reille delivered a message to Massena from Bonaparte that outlined his strategy to enter Italy across the Alps and strike the Austrians from behind. Massena's role was to hold out as long as possible to divert Austrian forces away from the Army of Reserve's offensive. After a grain shipment got through the British blockade on 5 May, Massena organized a sortie by the French defenders. Ott planned to trap the next sortie by having GM Friedrich Heinrich von Gottesheim's soldiers lure the French out so that soldiers led by Hohenzollern could cut them off. On 11 May the French sortied led by Soult, but instead of falling back, Gottesheim fiercely resisted the attack. The French defeated Gottesheim's force in a frontal contest, inflicting losses of 137 killed, 328 wounded, and 1,362 captured. On 13 May Soult sortied again, but this time Frimont's troops struck the French attackers in the flank, routing them. Soult was wounded in the leg and captured. This marked the last serious French sortie.

Massena continued to hold out despite large numbers of French soldiers and civilians starting to die from starvation and typhus. By 20 May 1800, the French were eating a tasteless bread made from starch, linseed oil, and cacao. Austrian prisoners in the prison hulks were placed on one-quarter rations; they ate the ship's rigging and finally resorted to cannibalism. On 29 May, the Genoese inhabitants rebelled, and Massena had to set up cannons in the streets to prevent riots. On 2 June, Ott received orders from Melas to abandon the siege and march to join the main army. Feeling that Massena was ready to give up, Ott disobeyed and continued the siege. In fact, that day, Massena signaled that he was ready to negotiate. On 4 June, Masséna's negotiator finally agreed to evacuate the French army from Genoa. However, "if the word capitulation was mentioned or written", Masséna threatened to end all negotiations. Massena demanded that his soldiers would be free to begin fighting as soon as they reached French-held territory and insisted on other privileges as well. Ott agreed to the terms.

== Aftermath ==
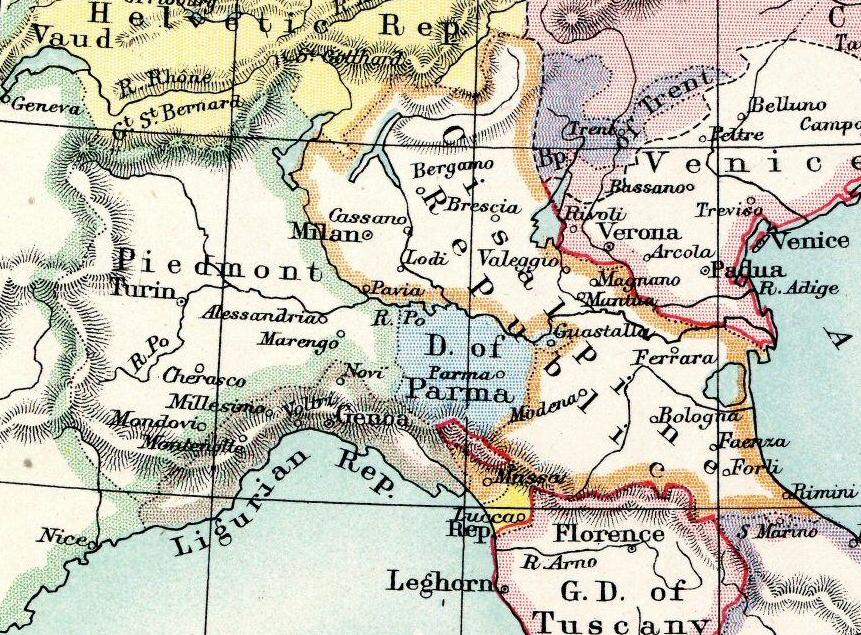
Map shows northern Italy in 1800, including Genoa, Turin, Milan, Nice, Marengo, and Great St Bernard Pass.

Two days later, 7,000 French soldiers with their arms left Genoa, according to Arnold. Of these, 6,000 proved to be unfit for combat. Under the terms of surrender, British warships transported wounded and sick French troops along with the defenders' artillery and baggage to French-held territory. Historian Digby Smith reported that 4,000 French soldiers died during the siege and that only 4,000 were fit enough to march out. Austrian casualties were 2,500 killed and wounded, plus 3,500 captured. Gaston Bodart reported that Austrian losses in the siege were 3,000 killed and wounded, and 3,500 captured. Bodart asserted that 8,000 French soldiers and 15,000 civilians died during the siege. Before leaving, Massena told GM Franz Xaver Saint-Julien that the French would be back in Genoa within three weeks. Saint-Julien replied, "You will find in this place, general, men whom you have taught how to defend it". The Austrians captured Genoa at a cost of about 20,000 casualties, while the French suffered 14,000 casualties plus 6,000 sick.

On 27 May 1800, Melas finally realized that the Army of Reserve was at Ivrea. Believing that Bonaparte would try to attack Turin, Melas massed 18,000 Austrians at that city. Instead, Bonaparte was headed for Milan which was captured on 2 June. Bonaparte got news that Genoa surrendered on 7 June. In the Battle of Marengo on 14 June 1800, Bonaparte soundly defeated Melas' main army. Melas was hopelessly isolated by superior forces and was compelled to negotiate the Convention of Alessandria where he gave up 12 fortresses. Bonaparte's victory consolidated his political position as First Consul.

Later, Bonaparte wrote to Massena, "I am not able to give you a greater mark of the confidence I have in you than by giving you command of the first army of the Republic [i.e. the Army of Italy]." The Austrians also recognized the significance of Massena's defense; the Austrian chief of staff (GM Anton von Zach) declared firmly, "You won the battle, not in front of Alessandria but in front of Genoa."

== Notes ==
Footnotes

Citations
