= Romano Canavese =

- Comune
- Comune di Romano Canavese
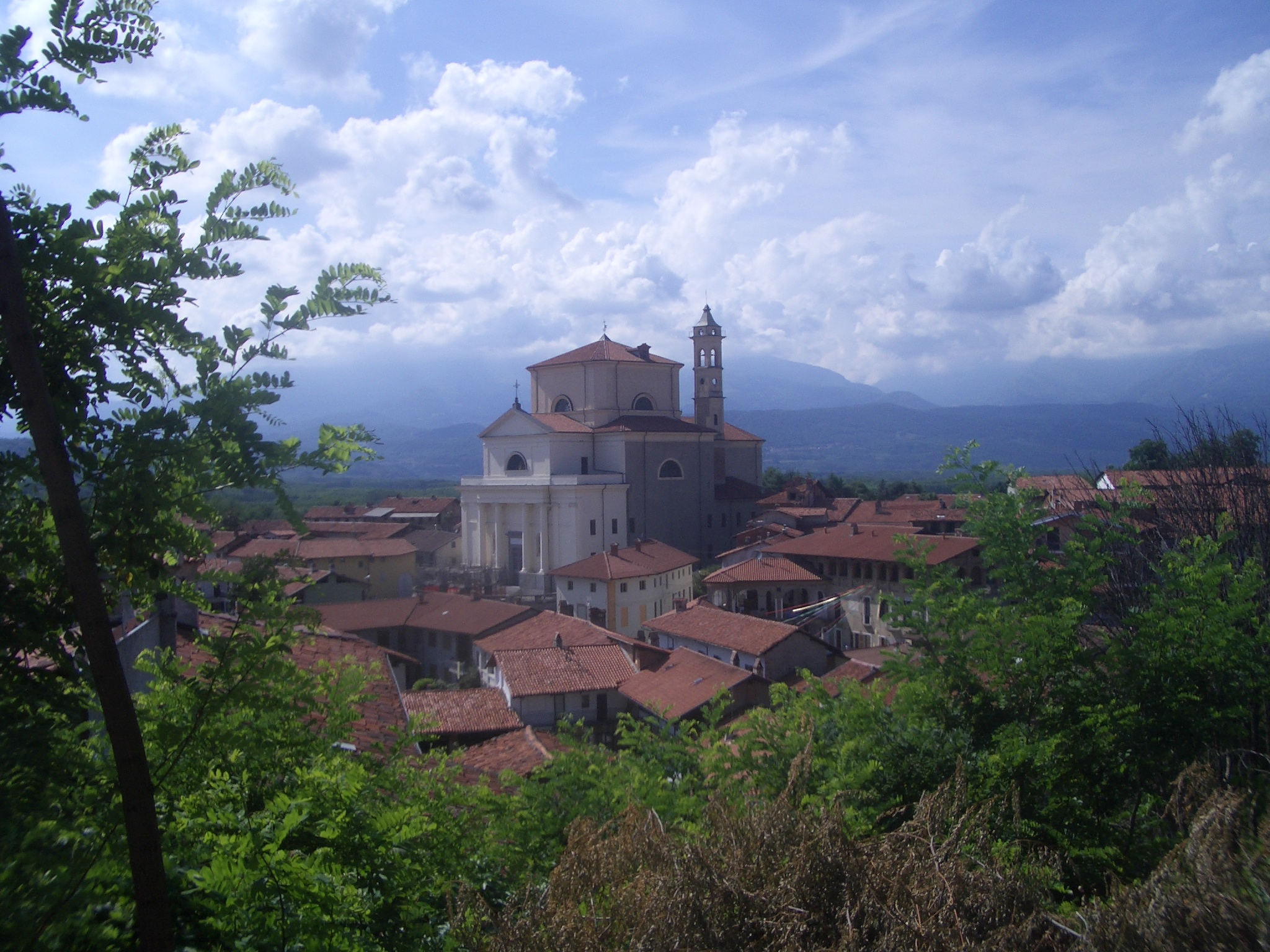

- Coat of arms

- Location within Italy Location within Piedmont
- Coordinates: 45°23′N 7°52′E
- Country: Italy
- Region: Piedmont
- Metropolitan city: Turin (TO)
- Frazioni: Canton Moretti, Cascine di Romano

Government
  - Mayor: Oscarino Ferrero

Area
  - Total: 11.2 km^{2} (4.3 sq mi)
- Elevation: 270 m (890 ft)

Population (31 December 2010)
  - Total: 2,957
  - Density: 264/km^{2} (684/sq mi)
- Demonym: Romanesi
- Time zone: UTC+1 (CET)
  - Summer (DST): UTC+2 (CEST)
- Postal code: 10090
- Dialing code: 0125
- Website: Official website

Romano Canavese is a comune (municipality) in the Metropolitan City of Turin in the Italian region Piedmont, located about 40 kilometres (25 mi) northeast of Turin.

== Main sights ==
- Communal Tower (14th century), now turned into a bell tower, and the surrounding park.
- Remains of the Ricetto (fortress)
- Church of Santa Marta, in the Ricetto, dating to the 13th century but with a Baroque façade
- Villa Bocca
