= Karl Joseph Hadik von Futak =

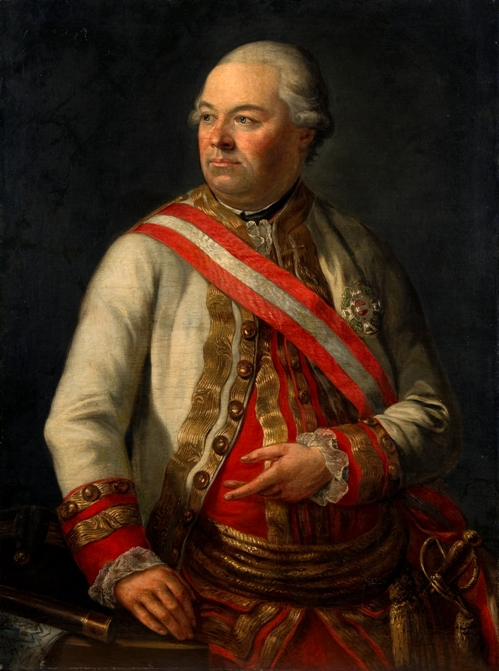
- Born: 28 October 1756; Lőcse, Kingdom of Hungary
- Died: 24 July 1800 (aged 43); Alessandria, Italy
- Relatives: Son of András Hadik
- Military career
- Allegiance: Habsburg monarchy
- Branch: Cavalry
- Service years: 1766–1800
- Rank: Feldmarschallleutnant
- Conflicts: War of the Bavarian Succession; Austro-Turkish War (1788–1791); French Revolutionary Wars
- Awards: Military Order of Maria Theresa (Commander's Cross)

Karl Joseph Graf Hadik von Futak (28 October 1756 in Lőcse – 24 July 1800 in Alessandria) was a Hungarian cavalry soldier and commander serving in the Austrian Imperial Army during the War of the Bavarian Succession, Austro-Turkish War (1787–1791), and French Revolutionary Wars. He commanded a detachment at Steinbach engagement, fought Napoleon's vanguard at the Chiusella River and was mortally wounded at Marengo, where he commanded the center column.
