= Marshal of the Empire =

French military title

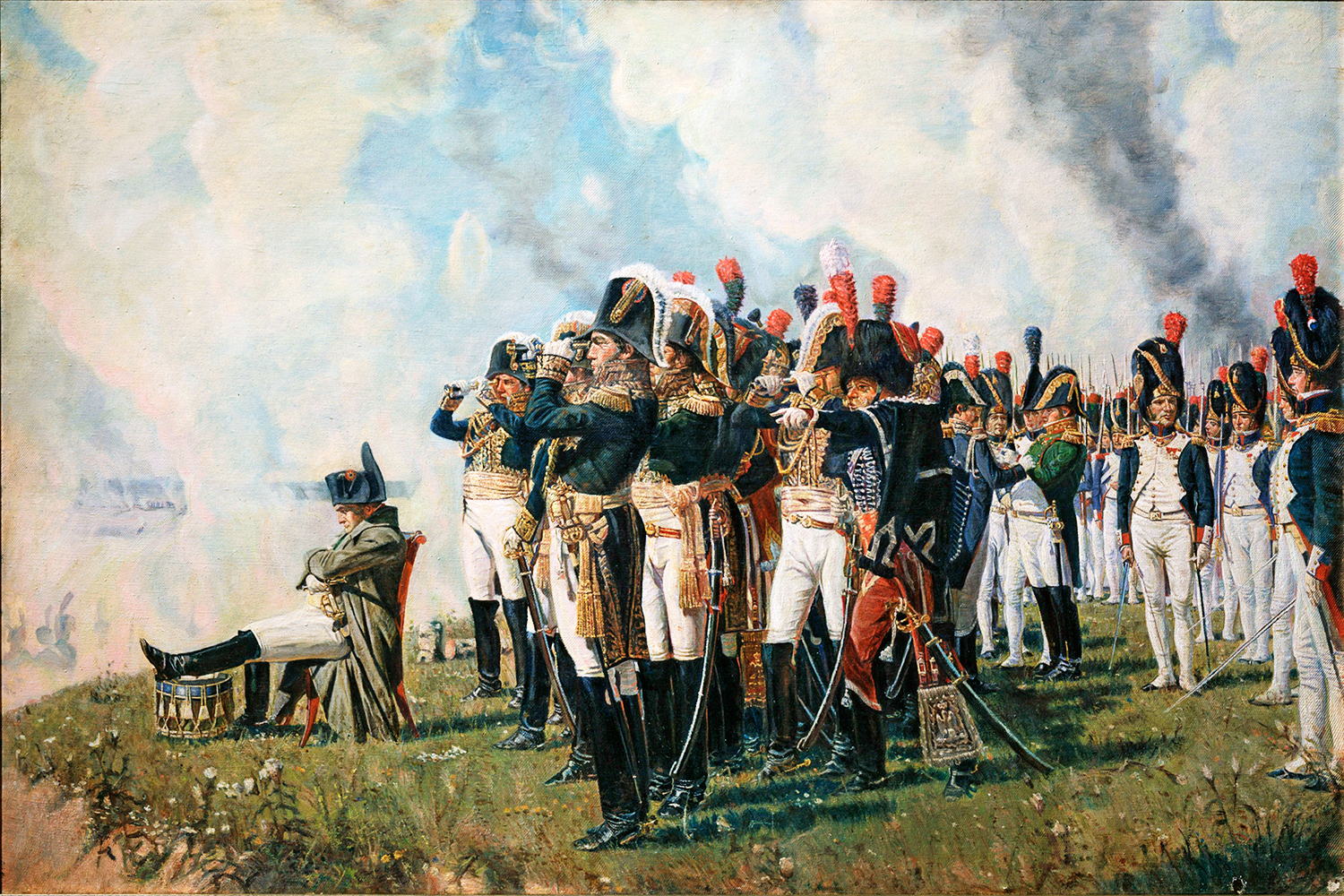
Napoleon near Borodino, an 1897 painting by Vasily Vereshchagin. Several Marshals (recognisable by their white-feathered bicornes) are depicted in the painting.

Marshal of the Empire (French: Maréchal d'Empire) was a civil dignity during the First French Empire. It was established by Sénatus-consulte on 18 May 1804 and to a large extent reinstated the formerly abolished title of Marshal of France. According to the Sénatus-consulte, a Marshal was a grand officer of the Empire, entitled to a high-standing position at the court and to the presidency of an electoral college.

Although in theory reserved "to the most distinguished generals", in practice Emperor Napoleon I granted the title according to his own wishes and convictions and made at least a few controversial choices. Although not a military rank, a Marshal displayed four silver stars, while the highest rank in the French Imperial Army, divisional general, displayed three stars. Furthermore, the Marshalate quickly became the prestigious sign of the supreme military attainment and it became customary that the most significant commands be given to a Marshal. Each Marshal held his own coat of arms, was entitled to special honours, and several of them held top functions within the army. They wore distinctive uniforms and were entitled to carry a baton, which was a symbol of their authority.

Throughout his reign from 1804 to 1814 and then 1815, Napoleon appointed a total of 26 Marshals, although their number never exceeded 20 at any one moment. The initial list of 1804 included 14 names of active generals and four names of retired generals, who were given the "honorary" title of Marshal. Six other promotions ensued, with eight other generals elevated to the Marshalate. The title often ensured a highly privileged social status – four Marshals were created Counts of the Empire and 17 received either the title of Duke or Prince. With two exceptions – Jean-Baptiste Bessières and Jean-Mathieu-Philibert Sérurier – the Marshals led a sumptuous lifestyle and left behind significant, at times immense, fortunes. Several of them received significant annuities; in addition, a few received financial endowments from the Emperor, with two of them – Louis-Alexandre Berthier and André Masséna – receiving more than one million francs each. Two Marshals – Joachim Murat and Jean-Baptiste Bernadotte– went on to become kings, with the latter being the direct ancestor of the current Swedish royal family.

Most of the Marshals held significant commands during the Napoleonic Wars, winning some of the most brilliant victories of the entire Napoleonic Wars. Three of them—viz., Jean Lannes, Louis-Nicolas Davout, and Louis-Gabriel Suchet—were virtually never defeated in pitched battle, despite fighting in dozens of engagements. While they were not normally expected to lead from the front, they often exposed themselves to great dangers on the battlefields of Europe; three Marshals – Jean Lannes, Jean-Baptiste Bessières, and Józef Poniatowski – were killed in action or died as a result of battle wounds. During his five years as a Marshal of the Empire (1809–1814), Nicolas-Charles Oudinot received seven of a total of 34 battle wounds suffered throughout his career, but went on to live to the then venerable age of 81. Often formidable when serving under the direct command of Napoleon, the Marshals proved to be less effective when having to cooperate in the Emperor's absence. Some repeatedly acted in bad faith when placed under the command of another Marshal, with conflicts sometimes leading to fatal military consequences. After Napoleon's downfall, most of them swore allegiance to the Bourbon Restoration and several went on to hold significant commands and positions.

== Origins ==
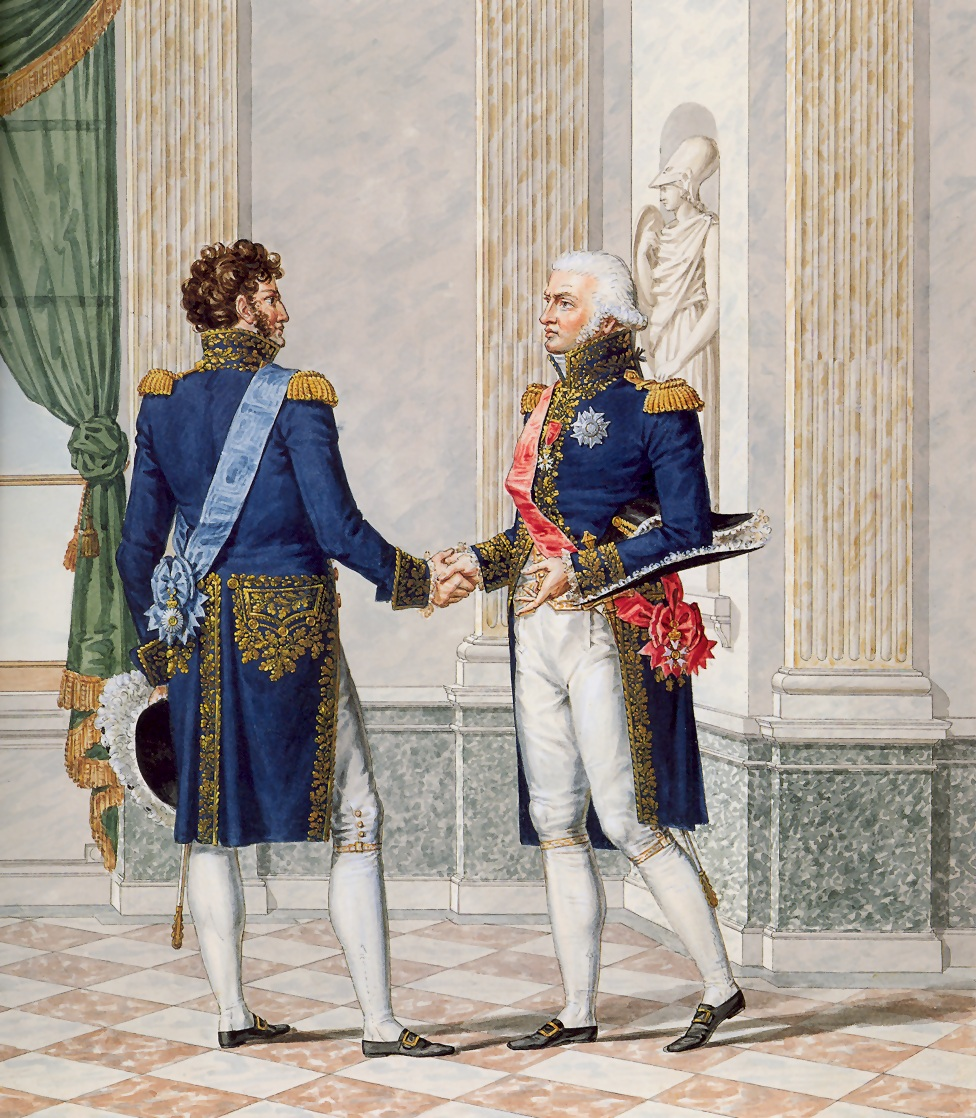
Official uniform of a Marshal of the Empire. It was designed by painter Jean-Baptiste Isabey and designer Charles Percier.

The French word Maréchal traces its origins back to the Carolingians, from the ancient German word marascahl, a stable supervisor who took care of the king's horses. With the growing importance of the battle horse during the early Middle Ages, the role came to acquire some prestige and began to be known as Marshal of France. Albéric Clément, who led King Philippe-Auguste's vanguard during the victory over the English at Bouvines in 1214, was the first recorded incumbent. At first, the role was granted to a single person, but three decades after Bouvines, King Louis IX of France set sail for the Seventh Crusade with two Marshals. As early as the 15th century, the Marshals no longer cared for the King's horses and stables, and were simply military leaders, a role that they would retain through to modern times. Although the position remained highly prestigious, their number grew throughout the centuries, with King Louis XIV naming as many as 51 Marshals during his 72-year reign. In the years leading to the French Revolution, there were constantly 15–16 Marshals, but a law of 4 March 1791 reduced their number to six and a decree of 21 February 1793 abolished the dignity altogether.

Eleven years later, Napoleon Bonaparte became Emperor of the French and wanted to institute a military elite for the new French Empire. Article 48 of Title of the 19 May 1804 sénatus-consulte set up the grand officers of the Empire, among which the highest-standing were the Marshals. In the Imperial court hierarchy, they came in the fifth rank, behind the Emperor and Empress, the Imperial family, the great dignitaries, and the ministers. They were entitled to a special etiquette: whenever the Emperor would write to them, he would call them Mon Cousin ("Cousin"), when a third party would write to them, they would be called Monsieur le Maréchal; and when spoken to, they would be called Monseigneur ("My Liege"). They were greeted with 13 cannon shots when at their headquarters and 11 when away. They were also entitled to their own personal coat of arms.

Graphic representation of a Marshal's baton during the First French Empire

Although a purely civil dignity reserved to distinguished generals and not a military rank, a Marshal displayed four stars, while the highest rank in the French Imperial Army, divisional general, displayed only three. Contrary to a well-established idea and to the representation on most paintings of the time, the Marshal's four stars were silvered, not gilded. A Marshal was required to wear a standard uniform, which was established through decree on 18 July 1804 and designed by painter Jean-Baptiste Isabey and designer Charles Percier. Nevertheless, the Marshals often chose to wear either variants of the official uniform or costumes of totally different design. The ultimate distinctive sign of a Marshal was his baton. It was cylindrical, 50 centimetres long and 4 centimetres and a half in diameter, made of wood and covered in dark blue velvet, decorated with golden eagles or honey bees, both Imperial symbols.

== Promotions ==
The creation of the new civil dignity allowed Napoleon to strengthen his newly created regime by rewarding the most valuable of the generals who had served under his command during his campaigns in Italy and Egypt or soldiers who had held significant commands during the French Revolutionary Wars. Subsequently, other senior generals were promoted on six occasions, mainly following major battlefield victories. With hindsight, Napoleon's choices for the Marshalate were not always well inspired.

=== First promotion (1804) ===
The first promotion created eighteen new Marshals of the Empire and coincided with the proclamation of the First French Empire and was used as an opportunity for the new Emperor to strengthen the new regime. The list included 14 names of generals who had served in the armies of the Republic during the French Revolutionary Wars: seven of them were generals who had served directly under Napoleon during his campaigns in Italy and Egypt. Moreover, he was also careful to reward several general officers who had acquired considerable fame and political influence while commanding the armies of the Republic, as well as several highly-promising generals who had held significant divisional commands in the Army of the Rhine. The latter were well known for their largely Republican sentiments and had never served under Napoleon's command. By rewarding them for their military accomplishments, Napoleon sought to gain their loyalty and make sure that they would be supporters, rather than opponents of the new Imperial regime.

Overall, the first promotion included 14 names of generals. An initial list was drafted by State Secretary Henri Jacques Guillaume Clarke and later altered by the Emperor. Napoleon added in his own handwriting Murat's name, which was conspicuously absent from Clarke's draft. This was possibly an omission, but there seems to be no evidence to that effect. The final list included the following names, in an order which to this day remains unclear:

- Louis-Alexandre Berthier, an experienced soldier of the Ancien Régime, a part of the French Expeditionary Corps during the American Revolutionary War, who had become Napoleon's 'indispensable' chief of staff, creating a complex staff system mainly composed of three groups that proved highly effective
- Joachim Murat, who had married Napoleon's sister, Caroline, and subsequently made a name for himself under the command of his brother-in-law as a dashing cavalry commander. Later made King of Naples in 1808.
- Bon-Adrien Jeannot de Moncey, a competent if unexceptional soldier, who had been the commander-in-chief of the French army that defeated Spain and forced it out of the First Coalition
- Jean-Baptiste Jourdan, the hero of Fleurus, a staunch Republican, and held significant commands and campaigned on the Rhine
- André Masséna, a dogged and tenacious soldier, one of Napoleon's former senior divisional commanders from the First Italian Campaign and who subsequently acquired considerable reputation as an independent commander of armies
- Pierre Augereau, a skilled tactician, another of Napoleon's senior divisional commanders of the First Italian Campaign
- Jean-Baptiste Bernadotte, served as Minister of War and ambassador to Austria under the Directory, he was one of Jourdan's divisional commanders in the Army of the Rhine and himself a Republican, who also fought with Napoleon in Italy as a divisional commander, and commander of the Army of the West during the Consulate. Later became Crown Prince in 1810 and subsequently King of Sweden in 1818
- Guillaume Brune, a fierce Republican, he had been friends with the journalist Jean-Paul Marat and risen to become an influential soldier and diplomat who was the hero of the Battle of Castricum
- Jean-de-Dieu Soult, a dependable commander and organizer, who had served under Jourdan and Jean Victor Marie Moreau and became Masséna's right-hand man during the 1799–1800 campaigns
- Jean Lannes, a distinguished soldier who proved courageous in Italy and Egypt, rising to become a divisional general and commandant of the Consular Guard
- Édouard Mortier, a capable commander who served with great distinction during the War of the Second Coalition at Zurich and Hanover
- Michel Ney, an excellent cavalry officer who distinguished himself in the War of the First Coalition
- Louis-Nicolas Davout, perhaps Napoleon's finest general, a Republican and a commander in the consular guard and already had an impressive record, also serving in the Egyptian Expedition, although there were rumors that Davout had actually risen to the rank of Marshal because of the deaths of two of his patrons (General Desaix; at Marengo, and Charles Leclerc; died of yellow fever in Haiti)
- Jean-Baptiste Bessières, a fine cavalry commander, and one of Napoleon's closest friends

Four additional names were mentioned on the list: these were former senior generals who had held commands of armies and had been elected senators of the Republic. Their status was honorary due to their age and they weren't set to be given field commands.

- François Christophe de Kellermann, the oldest marshal chosen by Napoleon, supposedly honorary but in fact, Kellermann proved one of Napoleon's most effective at handling reserve-class forces.
- François Joseph Lefebvre, who continued to serve as field commander
- Catherine-Dominique de Pérignon, who fought in the Pyrenees frontier against Spain, winning several key victories, but retiring from military command shortly before becoming a Marshal, never held active military command again
- Jean-Mathieu-Philibert Sérurier, a close friend and supporter of Georges Danton, making him politically useful for Napoleon

=== Second promotion (1807) ===
- Claude Victor-Perrin, a skilled commander, who had served under Napoleon in the siege of Toulon and the Italian campaigns of the French Revolutionary Wars, where he became renowned for his military accomplishments. Made a Marshal for his performance at the Battle of Friedland

=== Third promotion (1809) ===
Three new marshals were created in the aftermath of the Battle of Wagram.

- Jacques MacDonald, the only Marshal of the Empire to be promoted on a battlefield, and was Napoleon's choice for "France"
- Nicolas Charles Oudinot, Napoleon's choice for the "Army"
- Auguste de Marmont, was the choice of "friendship", probably to Napoleon

=== Fourth promotion (1811) ===
- Louis-Gabriel Suchet, one of the most prominent and successful marshals of the Napoleonic Wars and the only Marshal to gain his baton in the Peninsular Wars after his victory at Taragona.

=== Fifth promotion (1812) ===
- Laurent de Gouvion Saint-Cyr was made a Marshal after routing a Russian army at Polotsk, defending the French spearhead which was driving towards Moscow.

=== Sixth promotion (1813) ===
- Józef Antoni Poniatowski was a firm supporter of Napoleon and participated in the Invasion of Russia. He was among the rearguard at the disastrous Battle of Leipzig and was drowned, having only served as Marshal of the Empire for three days. He was the first and only Marshal of Napoleon who was not French. He was a member of the House of Poniatowski.

=== Seventh promotion (1815) ===
- Emmanuel de Grouchy was made a Marshal at the latter stages of Napoleon's military career. A capable cavalry general throughout the Napoleonic wars, Grouchy was made a Marshal before the Hundred Days. He was widely blamed for not joining with Napoleon for the Battle of Waterloo, getting himself into unnecessary battles with Prussian field commander, Von Blücher.

=== Controversies ===
Among the men who were offered the Marshalate, there was a mix of famous generals, who had commanded the armies of the Republic (Brune, Jourdan, Kellermann, Lefebvre, Masséna, Moncey), as well as more junior generals, whose command never exceeded division-sized forces (Mortier, Ney, Soult). It even included relatively obscure generals from Napoleon's Italian or Egyptian expeditions, who had recently secured their promotion to the highest military rank of divisional general, but had never held significant commands (Bessières, Davout, Lannes). Unsurprisingly, this created a certain degree of discontentment among the more senior commanders. André Masséna was noted for his sardonic remark, "There's fourteen of us...", which he muttered when his friends came to congratulate him for his nomination. Auguste Frédéric Louis Viesse de Marmont, then a young general, possibly bitter that he had not been nominated also observed that: "If Bessières is a Marshal, then anyone can be." Ironically, Marmont himself was made a Marshal of the Empire in 1809, though it was said he was awarded the distinction for his close friendship with Napoleon as opposed to any great generalship.

== List of the Marshals of the Empire ==
Marshal	Titles	Birth	Death	Promoted	Battle record	Portrait	Commands held
Pierre Augereau	Duke of Castiglione	21 October 1757 in Paris	12 June 1816 in La Houssaye-en-Brie	1804	Battle of Loano, Battle of Castiglione, Battle of Arcole, Battle of Ulm, Battle of Jena-Auerstedt, Battle of Eylau, Siege of Girona, Battle of Leipzig		Divisional Commander in the Pyrenees, Divisional Commander in the army of Italy, VII Corps (Grande Armée) (1803–1811), part of the Rearguard in the Russian campaign, IX Corps (Grande Armée) (1813–1814), Army of Lyon (1814)
Jean-Baptiste Bernadotte	Prince of Pontecorvo later King of Sweden	26 January 1763 in Pau	8 March 1844 in Stockholm	1804	Siege of Cuddalore, Battle of Fleurus, Battle of Theiningen, Battle of Ulm, Battle of Austerlitz, Battle of Auerstedt, Battle of Wagram, Battle of Großbeeren, Battle of Dennewitz, Battle of Leipzig		71st Demi Brigade, Command of Division in the army of Sambre-et-Meuse, 4th Division in the Army of Italy, French Ambassador to Vienna, Minister of war (1798), Commander of the Army of the west, Governor of Louisiana (Never took the post as Louisiana was sold to the United States), Governor of Hanover (1804–1805), Army of Northern Germany (1805), I Corps (Grande Armée) (1805–1807), Governor of the Hanseatic Ports (1808), 9th Corps (Saxony) (1809), Walchren Defense Army (Late 1809), As King of Sweden: Army of the North in the War of the Sixth Coalition
Louis-Alexandre Berthier	Prince of Wagram, Sovereign Prince of Neuchâtel	20 November 1753 in Versailles	1 June 1815 in Bamberg	1804	Battle of Rhode Island, Siege of Yorktown, Battle of Rivoli, Battle of Ulm, Battle of Austerlitz, Battle of Jena-Auerstedt, Battle of Eylau, Battle of Friedland, Battle of Coruna, Battle of Regensburg, Battle of Eckmühl, Battle of Aspern-Essling, Battle of Wagram, Battle of Znaim, Battle of Smolensk, Battle of Borodino, Battle of the Berezina, Battle of Lützen, Battle of Bautzen, Battle of Dresden, Battle of Leipzig, Battle of Hanau, Battle of Brienne, Battle of Champaubert, Battle of Montmirail, Battle of Château-Thierry, Battle of Vauchamps		Temporary Command of the Army of Italy (1797–1798), Napoleon's Chief of Staff (1792–1814), Temporary Command of the Army against Austria (1809)
Jean-Baptiste Bessières	Duke of Istria	6 August 1768 in Prayssac	1 May 1813 near Lützen	1804	Battle of Boulou, Battle of Abukir, Battle of Marengo, Battle of Austerlitz, Battle of Eylau, Battle of Medina del Rioseco, Battle of Aspern-Essling, Battle of Wagram, Battle of Fuentes de Oñoro, Battle of Lützen †		Imperial Guard (Napoleon I), Command of Cavalry in the Grande Armée during early 1813
Guillaume Brune	Count of the Empire	13 March 1763 in Brive-la-Gaillarde	2 August 1815 in Avignon	1804	Battle of Valmy, Battle of Hondschoote, Battle of Fleurus, Battle of Neerwinden, Federalist Revolt, 13 Vendémiaire, Battle of Arcole, Battle of Rivoli, French invasion of Switzerland, Cisalpine Coup, Battle of Castricum, Battle of Monzambanno, Battle of Pollozzo, Siege of Stralsund, Hundred Days		Division in the Army of the North, Division in the Army of Italy, Army of Switzerland, Army of Holland, Army of Italy, Ambassador to the Ottoman Empire, Camp of Boulougne (1806–1807), Governor general of the Hanseatic Ports (1807), Army of Pomerania (1807) Army of the Var 1815
Louis-Nicolas Davout	Duke of Auerstaedt, Prince of Eckmühl	10 May 1770 in Annoux	1 June 1823 in Paris	1804	Battle of Neerwinden, Battle of Abukir, Battle of Austerlitz, Battle of Jena–Auerstedt, Battle of Eylau, Battle of Teugen-Hausen, Battle of Eckmühl, Battle of Aspern-Essling, Battle of Wagram, Battle of Saltanovka, Battle of Borodino, Battle of Vyazma, Battle of Krasnoi, Siege of Hamburg, Battle of Issy		Volunteer Corp (1792), Command of Division in the Army of Mosselle (1793–1794), III Corps (1804–1810), Governor of the Hanseatic Ports (1810–1812), I Corps (1812–1814), XIII Corps (Grande Armée) (1813–1814), War Minister during the War of the Seventh Coalition, Commanded the Defense of Paris (1815), Mayor of Savigny-sur-Orge (1822–1823)
Jean-Baptiste Jourdan	Count under the Bourbon Restoration	29 April 1762 in Limoges	23 November 1833 in Paris	1804	Siege of Savannah, Battle of Jemappes, Battle of Hondschoote, Battle of Wattignies, Battle of Lambusart, Battle of Fleurus, Siege of Luxembourg, Battle of Amberg, Battle of Wurzburg, Battle of Limburg, Battle of Ostrach, Battle of Stockach, Battle of Talavera, Battle of Vitoria		2nd Haute-Vienne Battalion of Volenteers, Division in the Army of the North, Army of the North (1793–1794), Army of the Moselle, Army of the Rhine, military advisor of King Josef in Spain, Governor of Hotel de Invalides (1830–1833)
François Christophe de Kellermann	Duke of Valmy	28 May 1735 in Strasbourg	23 September 1820 in Paris	1804	Battle of Valmy		Army of Alsace, Army of the Rhine, Command of Training & Reserve forces, President of the Senate
Jean Lannes	Duke of Montebello, Prince of Siewierz	10 April 1769 in Lectoure	31 May 1809 in Ebersdorf	1804	Battle of Lodi, Battle of Bassano, Battle of Castiglione, Battle of Arcole, Battle of Rivoli, Battle of Montebello, Battle of Abukir, Battle of Austerlitz, Battle of Jena–Auerstedt, Battle of Friedland, Battle of Tudela, Siege of Zaragoza, Battle of Teugen-Hausen, Siege of Regensburg, Battle of Landshut, Battle of Eckmühl, Battle of Aspern-Essling †		Division in the Pyrenees, Division in the Army of Italy, Brigade in Egypt, Consular Guard, V Corp
François Joseph Lefebvre	Duke of Dantzig	25 October 1755 in Rouffach	4 September 1820 in Paris	1804	Battle of Fleurus, Battle of Altenkirchen, Battle of Jena-Auerstedt, Siege of Danzig, Battle of Burgos, Battle of Eckmühl, Battle of Vilnius, Battle of Champaubert, Battle of Montmirail, Battle of Montereau, Battle of Arcis-sur-Aube		Sargent in the French Guards, brigade general, Commander of the Army of Sambre-et-Meuse, Commander of Vanguard in the Army of the Danube, Coup of 18 Brumaire, Division in the Old Guard, Infantry of the Imperial Guard (1805), X Corps, Army of Bavaria, Old Guard (1812–1814)
André Masséna	Duke of Rivoli, Prince of Essling Chief of Rivoli Peer of France	16 May 1758 in Nice	3 April 1817 in Paris	1804	Siege of Toulon, Battle of Loano, Battle of Montenotte, Battle of Dego, Battle of Mondovi, Battle of Castiglione, Battle of Bassano, Battle of Caldiero (1796), Battle of Arcole, Battle of Rivoli, Siege of Mantua, Battle of Zurich, Siege of Genoa, Battle of Verona, Battle of Caldiero (1805), Battle of Campo Tenese, Siege of Maida, Battle of Aspern-Essling, Battle of Wagram, Battle of Bussaco, Lines of Torres Vedras, Battle of Fuentes de Oñoro		Private in the Royal Italian Regiment, Warrant Officer in the Royal Italian Regiment, Officer of the French Army, Colonel in the Army of Italy, brigade general, divisional general, Commander of two divisions in army of Italy, Command of All French Forces in Italy, Garrison of Genoa, Army of Italy (1804–1806) Invasion force of Naples (1806), IV Corps (1809), Army of Portugal (1810–11), Local Commander at Marseille, Commander of the National Guard (1815)
Bon-Adrien Jeannot de Moncey	Duke of Conegliano Peer of France	31 July 1754 in Moncey	20 April 1842 in Paris	1804	Western Pyrannese Front, Siege of Zaragoza, Siege of Valencia, Battle of Paris, Spanish Intervention		Captain in the French Army, Battalion in the Pyrenees, Commander of the Western Pyrenees Army, Corps Sized Army in Switzerland, Inspector General of the Gendarmerie, Commander of a Corp in Spain, Head of the National Guard of Paris, Commander of Corp in the Spanish Intervention, Governor of Hotel des Invalides
Édouard Mortier	Duke of Treviso	13 February 1768 in Le Cateau-Cambrésis	28 July 1835 in Paris	1804	Battle of Wattignies, Second Battle of Zurich, Battle of Dürenstein, Battle of Lübeck, Battle of Friedland, Battle of Ocana, Battle of Krasnoi, Battle of Lützen, Battle of Leipzig, Battle of Paris		Surrender of Mainz, brigade general, divisional general, Occupation of Hanover, A Corp in the Ulm Campaign, VIII Corp (1804–1812), Imperial Guard (1812–1813 &1815), Ambassador to Russia
Joachim Murat	Prince Murat, Grand Duke of Berg, King of Naples	25 March 1767 in La Bastide-Fortunière	13 October 1815 in Pizzo Calabro, Calabria	1804	Battle of Abukir, Battle of Marengo, Battle of Austerlitz, Battle of Jena-Auerstedt, Battle of Eylau, Battle of Smolensk, Battle of Borodino, Battle of the Berezina, Battle of Dresden, Battle of Leipzig, Battle of Leipzig, Battle of Tolentino		Constitutional Guard, Corporal of the 12th Chasseurs, Sous-Lieutenant, Colonel, Aide-de-Camp of the Army of Italy, Commander of Cavalry, Army of Madrid, Commander of Cavalry in the Grande Armée (1812–1813), Neapolitan Invasion Force (1815)
Michel Ney	Duke of Elchingen, Prince of the Moskva, Peer of France	10 January 1769 in Saarlouis (then France)	7 December 1815 in Paris	1804	Battle of Valmy, Battle of Neerwinden, Siege of Mainz, Battle of Neuwied, Battle of Winterthur, Battle of Hohenlinden, Stickrieg, Battle of Elchingen, Battle of Ulm, Battle of Jena–Auerstedt, Siege of Magdeburg, Battle of Eylau, Battle of Friedland, Battle of Puerto de Baños, Siege of Ciudad Rodrigo, Siege of Almeida, Combat of the Côa, Battle of Bussaco, Battle of Pombal, Battle of Redinha, Battle of Fuentes de Oñoro, Battle of Casal Novo, Battle of Foz de Arouce, Battle of Smolensk, Battle of Borodino, Battle of Krasnoi, Battle of the Berezina, Battle of Weissenfels, Battle of Lützen, Battle of Bautzen, Battle of Dennewitz, Battle of Leipzig, Battle of Quatre Bras, Battle of Ligny, Battle of Waterloo		Colonel of the 4th Hussar Regiment, Officer in the Army of the North, brigade general, divisional general (1799), Cavalry of Forces in Switzerland, and the Danube, VI Corps (1804–1811), Right Wing of the Grande Armée at Friedland, III Corps (1812–1814), Left Wing of the Army of the North, Mass cavalry Charge at Waterloo
Catherine-Dominique de Pérignon	Count of the Empire	31 May 1754 in Grenade-Sur-Garonne	25 December 1818 in Paris	1804	Battle of Escola, Battle of Sant Llorenç de la Muga, Second Battle of Boulou, Siege of Roses (1794-1795), Battle of Novi		Army of the Eastern Pyrenees, Ambassador to Spain, Army of Liguria, Governor of Parma (1806–1808), Governor General of Naples (1808–1814)
Jean-Mathieu-Philibert Sérurier	Count of the Empire, Peer of France	8 December 1742 in Laon	21 December 1819 in Paris	1804	Battle of Rossbach, Battle of Warburg, Siege of Almieda, First Battle of Saorgio, Second Battle of Saorgio, First Battle of Dego, Battle of Loanno, Battle of Montenotte, Battle of Millesimo, Second Battle of Dego, Battle of Ceva, Battle of Mondovì, Battle of Lodi, Battle of Borghetto, Siege of Mantua, Battle of Valvasone, Battle of Verona, Battle of Magnano, Battle of Cassano, Battle of Paris		Colonel of the 70th Infantry Regiment, Column from the Army of Italy, General of Brigade, Right Flank of the Army of Italy, Left Flank, divisional general, inspector general of Troops in France, Command of Tryol Division, Defense of Verderio, Vice President of the Senate, Governor of Les Invalides
Jean-de-Dieu Soult	Duke of Dalmatia, Peer of France	29 March 1769 in Saint-Ammans-Soult	25 November 1851 in Saint-Ammans-Soult	1804	Battle of Kaiserslautern, Second Battle of Wissembourg, Battle of Arlon, Battle of Fleurus, Battle of Aldenhoven, Siege of Luxembourg, Battle of Altenkirchen, Battle of Friedburg, Battle of Stockach, First Battle of Zurich, Siege of Genoa, Battle of Marengo, Battle of Austerlitz, Battle of Jena–Auerstedt, Battle of Eylau, First Battle of Porto, Second Battle of Porto, Battle of Ocaña, Siege of Cádiz, Battle of Albuera, Siege of Burgos, Battle of Lützen, Battle of Bautzen, Battle of San Marcial, Battle of Nivelle, Battle of the Bidassoa, Battle of the Nive, Battle of Orthez, Battle of Toulouse		Instructor of the First Battalion of Volunteers (Bas-Rhin), Staff of the Army of Moselle, Adjutant General Brigade Chief, Active in the Army of the Rhine, brigade general, Deputy and Command of the Right wing in the Army of Italy, Defense of Genoa, Colonel General of Consular Guard, Governor General of Camp Boulogne, Corp in Austria, and Prussia, II Corp in Spain, Chief of Forces in Spain, IV Corps (1813), Command of French Forces at the Pyrenees Frontier, Chief of Staff for the Waterloo Campaign
Claude Victor-Perrin	Duke of Belluno Peer of France	7 December 1764 in Lamarche	1 March 1841 in Paris	1807	Siege of Toulon, Battle of Marengo, Battle of Jena-Auerstedt, Battle of Friedland, Battle of Talavera, Siege of Cádiz, Battle of Barrosa, Battle of the Berizina, Battle of Dresden, Battle of Leipzig, Battle of Brienne, Battle of La Rothière, Battle of Mormant, Battle of Montereau, Battle of Craonne		Brigade general (after the Siege of Toulon), divisional general, Fighting in the Vendee, Governor of Louisiana, Army of Holland, Division in V Corps, I Corps, Governor of Berlin, Southern Spain (1808–1812), Corps for the Invasion of Russia, Various Units from 1813 to 1814, War Minister (1821–1823), Major General of the Royal Guard (1830)
Étienne Macdonald	Duke of Taranto Peer of France	17 November 1765 in Sedan	25 September 1840 in Beaulieu-sur-Loire	1809	Battle of Jemappes, Battle of Trebbia (1799), Battle of Sacile, Battle of Caldiero (1809), Battle of the Piave River, Battle of Tarvis, Battle of Raab, Battle of Wagram, Battle of Lutzen, Battle of Bautzen, Battle of the Katzbach, Battle of Leipzig, Battle of Hanau, Battle of Mormant, Battle of Bar-sur-Aube, Battle of Laubressel, Battle of Saint-Dizier		Captain in the Dillion's Regiment, Aide-de-Camp of General Dumouriez, Colonel, Brigade in the Netherlands, Governor of Rome, Army of Naples, Governor of Versailles, Army of the Grisons (1800), French Ambassador to Denmark (1805), Military Advisor of Prince Eugène, Left Wing in the Invasion of Russia, German Campaign, Campaign of 1814, Major General of the Royal Bodyguard
Auguste de Marmont	Duke of Raguse	20 July 1774 in Châtillon-sur-Seine	22 March 1852 in Venice	1809	Battle of Arcole, Battle of Castiglione, Battle of Alexandria, Battle of the Pyramids, Battle of Marengo, Battle of Wagram, Battle of Znaim, Battle of Salamanca, Battle of Lützen, Battle of Bautzen, Battle of Dresden, Battle of Leipzig, Battle of Hanau, Battle of Brienne, Battle of La Rothière, Battle of Champaubert, Battle of Montmirail, Battle of Vauchamps, Battle of Gué-à-Tresmes, Battle of Laon, Battle of Reims, Battle of Fère-Champenoise, Battle of Paris (surrendered)		
Nicolas Oudinot	Duke of Reggio	25 April 1767 in Bar-le-Duc	13 September 1847 in Paris	1809	Battle of Monzembanno, Battle of Austerlitz, Siege of Danzig, Battle of Friedland, Battle of Aspern-Essling, Battle of Wagram, First Battle of Polotsk, Battle of the Berizina, Battle of Großbeeren, Battle of Dennewitz, Battle of Leipzig, Battle of Brienne, Battle of La Rothière, Battle of Mormant, Battle of Bar-sur-Aube, Battle of Laubressel, Battle of Arcis-sur-Aube		
Louis-Gabriel Suchet	Duke of Albufera	2 March 1770 in Lyon	3 January 1826 near Marseille	1811	Siege of Toulon, Battle of Lodi, Battle of Castiglione, Battle of Bozanno, Battle of Arcole, Battle of Rivoli, Battle of the Var, Battle of Austerlitz, Battle of Jena-Auerstedt, Battle of Poltusk, Siege of Zarragoza, Battle of Alcaniz, Battle of Maria, Battle of Belchite, Siege of Lérida, Siege of Mequinenza, Siege of Tortosa, Siege of Tarragona, Battle of Saguntum, Siege of Valencia, Battle of Castalla, Alps Campaign of the 100 days		
Laurent de Gouvion-Saint-Cyr	Count of the Empire	13 April 1764 in Toul	17 March 1830 in Hyeres	1812	Battle of Novi, Battle of Biberach, Battle of Castelfranco, Siege of Girona, First Battle of Polotsk, Second Battle of Polotsk, Battle of Dresden, Siege of Dresden		
Józef Poniatowski	Prince of Poland and of the Holy Roman Empire	7 May 1763 in Vienna	19 October 1813 in Leipzig	1813	Battle of Raszyn, Battle of Smolensk, Battle of Borodino, Battle of Maloyaroslavetz, Battle of Vyazma, Battle of the Berezina, Battle of Leipzig †		
Emmanuel de Grouchy	Count of the Empire	23 October 1766 in Paris	29 May 1847 in Saint-Étienne	1815	Battle of Novi, Battle of Hohenlinden, Battle of Jena-Auerstedt, Battle of Eylau, Battle of Friedland, Battle of Raab, Battle of Wagram, Battle of Smolensk, Battle of Borodino, Battle of Maloyaroslavetz, Battle of Krasnoi, Battle of Brienne, Battle of La Rothière, Battle of Vauchamps, Battle of Craonne, Battle of Ligny, Battle of Wavre		

== See also ==
- French Imperial Army (1804–1815)
- Grand Marshal of the Palace
- Eugene de Beauharnais
- List of French generals of the Revolutionary and Napoleonic Wars
- Marshal of Holland
