= Louis Davout d'Auerstedt =

Louis Nicolas Marie Bernard Davout (24 March 1877 in Clermont-Ferrand – 1 March 1958 in Saint-Gaudens) was the 4th Duc d'Auerstaedt from 1904 to his death.

He is the son of Léopold Davout (1829–1904), 3rd Duc d'Auerstaedt from 1864 to his death, and Alice de Voize (1845–1935).

On 20 February 1902, in Paris, he married Hélène Eugénie Françoise Marie Étignard de la Faulotte (10 September 1880 in Paris – 24 January 1946 in Bellozanne (Bellozane is a part of Brémontier-Merval)), and had issue, fourteen children (five sons and nine daughters).

He was mayor of Brémontier-Merval (Seine-Inférieure, Upper Normandy) from 1928 to 1945, after his father-in-law Henri Étignard de La Faulotte, mayor from 1881 to 1928.

== Ancestry ==
Ancestors of Louis Davout d'Auerstedt

16. Nicolas Davout (1686–1742), seigneur d'Annoux
8. Jean François Davout (1739–1779)
17. Catherine de Somme
4. Isidore Louis Charles Davout (1774–1854)
18. Étienne Minard ( -1757)
9. Françoise Adélaïde Minard de Velars (1741–1810)
19.
2. Léopold Davout d'Auerstaedt (1829–1904), third Duc d'Auerstaedt, general
20.
10.
21.
5. Clara de Chever(r)y (1804–1895)
22.
11.
23.
1. Louis Davout d’Auerstedt (1877–1958), fourth Duc d'Auerstaedt
24. Jacques de Voize
12. Jacques Philippe de Voize (1745–1832)
25. Marthe Rochas
6. Adolphe de Voize (1807–1867) X1826
26. Antoine Guillet
13. Françoise Guillet
27. Jeanne Jacquin
3. Alice de Voize (1845–1935)
28.
14.
29.
7. Nathalie Bouland (1821–1868)
30.
15.
31.

Ancestors of his wife

16. Jacques Étignard de Lafaulotte (1746–1812)
8. Claude Louis Étignard de Lafaulotte (1786–1852)
17. Suzanne Marie Roger de La Baume
4. Ernest Étignard de Lafaulotte (1819–1872)
18. César Joseph Bacot (1753–1836)
9. Germaine Bacot (1791–1859)
19. Élisabeth Étignard de Lafaulotte (1756–1812)
2. Henri Étignard de Lafaulotte (1850–1928)
20. Jacques Étignard de Lafaulotte (1746–1812) (= 16)
10. Alexandre Jacques Étignard de Lafaulotte (1789–1844)
21. Suzanne Marie Roger de La Baume (= 17)
5. Marie Étignard de Lafaulotte (1828–1885)
22.
11. Victorine Didier (1804–1895)
23.
1. Hélène Étignard de Lafaulotte (1880–1946), Duchesse d'Auerstaedt jure uxoris
24. André Joseph Pajot (1746–1811)
12. Pierre Claude Pajol (1772–1844), comte de l'Empire, general
25. Élisabeth Nodier
6. Louis Eugène Léonce Pajol (1817–1885), general
26. Nicolas-Charles Oudinot (1767–1847), duc de Reggio, marshall
13. Marie Louise Élise Oudinot de Reggio (1790–1832)
27. Charlotte Derlin (1768–1810)
3. Marie-Malvina-Françoise-Amandine Pajol
28. Charles Certain (1763–1838), first comte de Bellozanne
14. Charles Certain (1795–1840), second comte de Bellozanne
29. Victoire Élisabeth Ameil (1776–1815)
7. Marguerite Certain de Bellozanne (1829–1888)
30. Édouard Mortier (1768–1835), duc de Trévise, marshall
15. Sophie Malvina Joséphine Mortier de Trévise (1803–1883)
31. Eva Anna Hymnes (1779–1855)

== Bibliography ==
- Almanach de Gotha : volume II (part III Families), 185^{e} édition, 2001, London, Boydell & Brewer, 1000 pages, 16 cm, ISBN 0-9532-1423-0, « Auerstedt (House of d’Avout) » (pages 35–43).
- (in French) Vicomte d’Avout (Jacques d’Avout), Les d’Avout : étude généalogique d’une famille d’ancienne chevalerie du duché de Bourgogne, Dijon, imprimerie Darantière, M CM LII (1952), 86 pages, 31 cm, page 71 for « Louis-Nicolas-Marie-Bernard, 4e duc d’Auerstaedt ».

== Notes ==
French nobility
Preceded by Léopold Davout (b. 1829)	Duke of Auerstaedt; 1904–1958	Succeeded by Léopold Davout (b. 1904)
