= Léopold Davout d'Auerstaedt =

French general (born 1829)

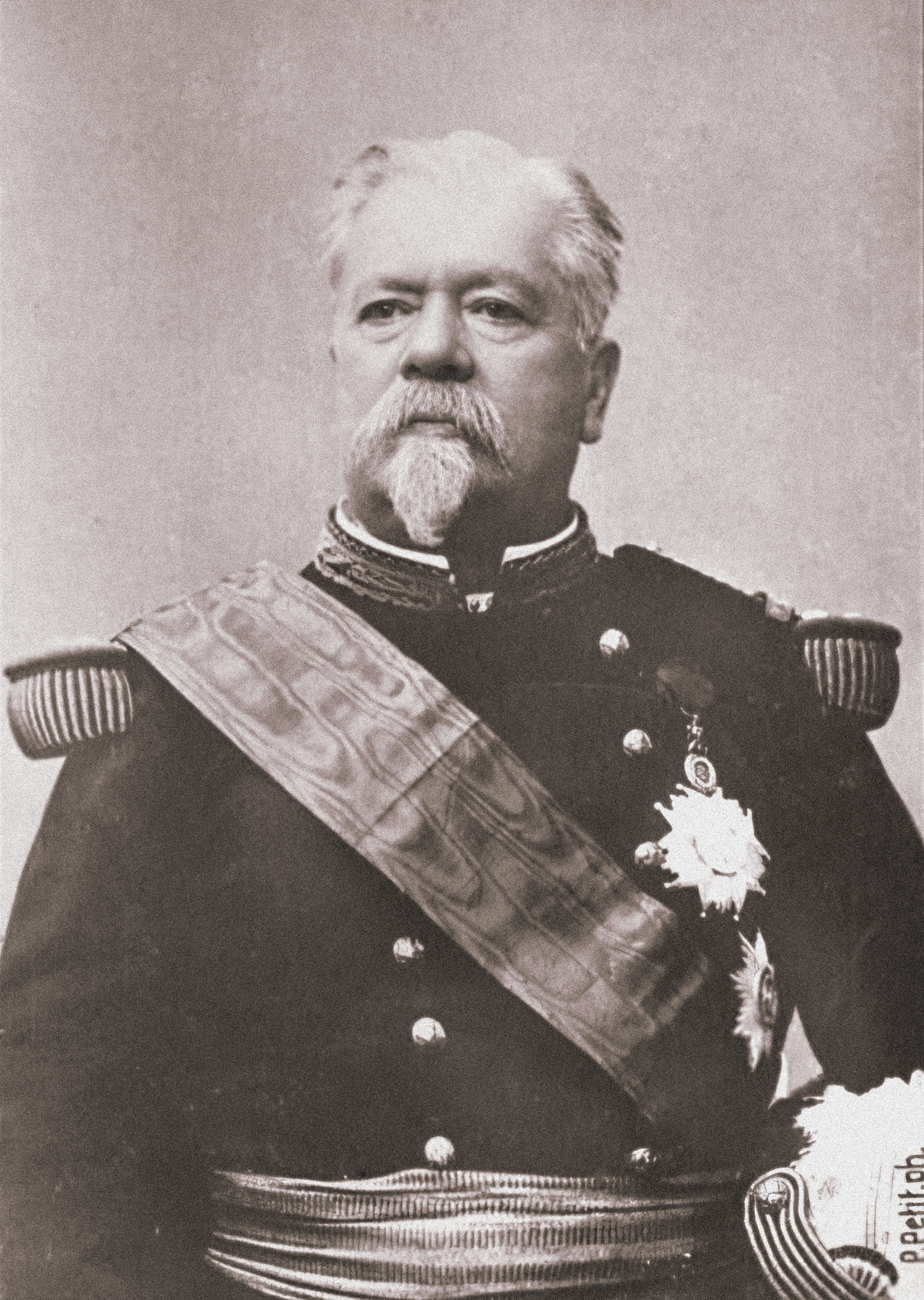

Léopold Davout d'Auerstaedt, 3rd Duc d'Auerstaedt (August 9, 1829 – February 9, 1904) was a French General of the Second Empire and restored to the extinct title as 3rd Duc d'Auerstaedt, a title originally held by his uncle Louis Nicolas Davout. The title was resurrected by an Imperial edict of Napoleon III in 1864. He was the son of Charles Isidor Davout (1774-1854) and wife (married in 1824) Claire de Chevery (1804-1895).

Davout was born to a Burgundian noble family and served in the French Army from 1849 until 1877. He took part in Napoleon III's disastrous Franco-Prussian War.

He married on June 16, 1858 Jeanne Alice de Voize, by whom he had issue, three daughters and a son:

- Napoléonie Jeanne Aimée Marguerite (Lyon, December 14, 1869-Paris, March 25, 1952), married in Paris, June 26, 1890 Vicomte Marie Alexandre François Daru (Paris, July 25, 1852-Pau, October 31, 1921)
- Marie-Mathilde (Motel, September 10, 1871-Bizy, May 31, 1955), married in Paris, June 27, 1895 Joseph Gaspard Comte de Berthier-Bizy (Bizy, July 14, 1866-Versailles, July 26, 1910)
- Claire Marie Marguerite (Versailles, August 28, 1873-Chevreuse, September 16, 1967), unmarried and without issue
- Louis Nicolas Marie Bernard, 4th Duc d'Auerstedt (Clermont-Ferrand, March 24, 1877-Saint-Gaudens, March 1, 1958), married in Paris, February 20, 1902 Hélène Eugénie Françoise Marie Etignard de la Faulotte (Paris, September 10, 1880-Bellozanne, January 24, 1946), and had issue, fourteen children

French nobility
Preceded by Vacant, last held by Napoléon Louis Davout	Duke of Auerstaedt; 1864–1904	Succeeded by Louis Nicolas Marie Bernard Davout
