= Napoléon Louis Davout d'Auerstaedt d'Eckmühl =

French duke

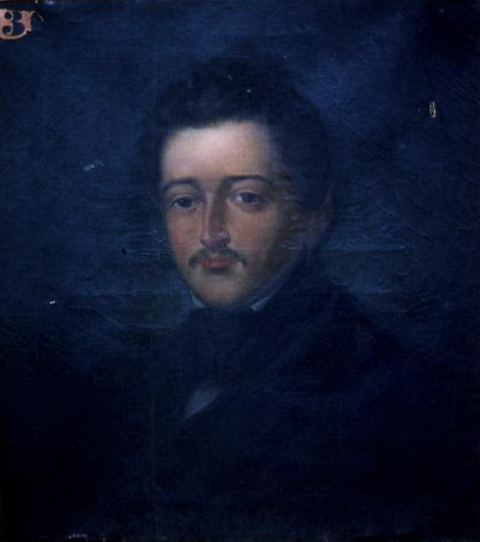
Portrait by Louis-Henri de Rudder

Napoléon Louis Davout (6 January 1811 – 13 June 1853), was a French nobleman and military officer. Born in Paris, he was the son of Louis Nicolas Davout, Marshal of the Empire. Davout inherited the titles Prince of Eckmühl (prince d'Eckmühl) and Duke of Auerstaedt (duc d'Auerstaedt) upon his father's death in 1823. The title became extinct in 1853.

Davout was also Mayor of Savigny-sur-Orge from 1843 to 1846. He died unmarried and without issue.

Preceded by Louis-Nicolas Davout	Duke of Auerstaedt; 1823–1853	Succeeded by Vacant, later held by Léopold Davout
