= Battle of Steyr =

1805 Battle during the War of the Third Coalition

- Part of the War of the Third Coalition
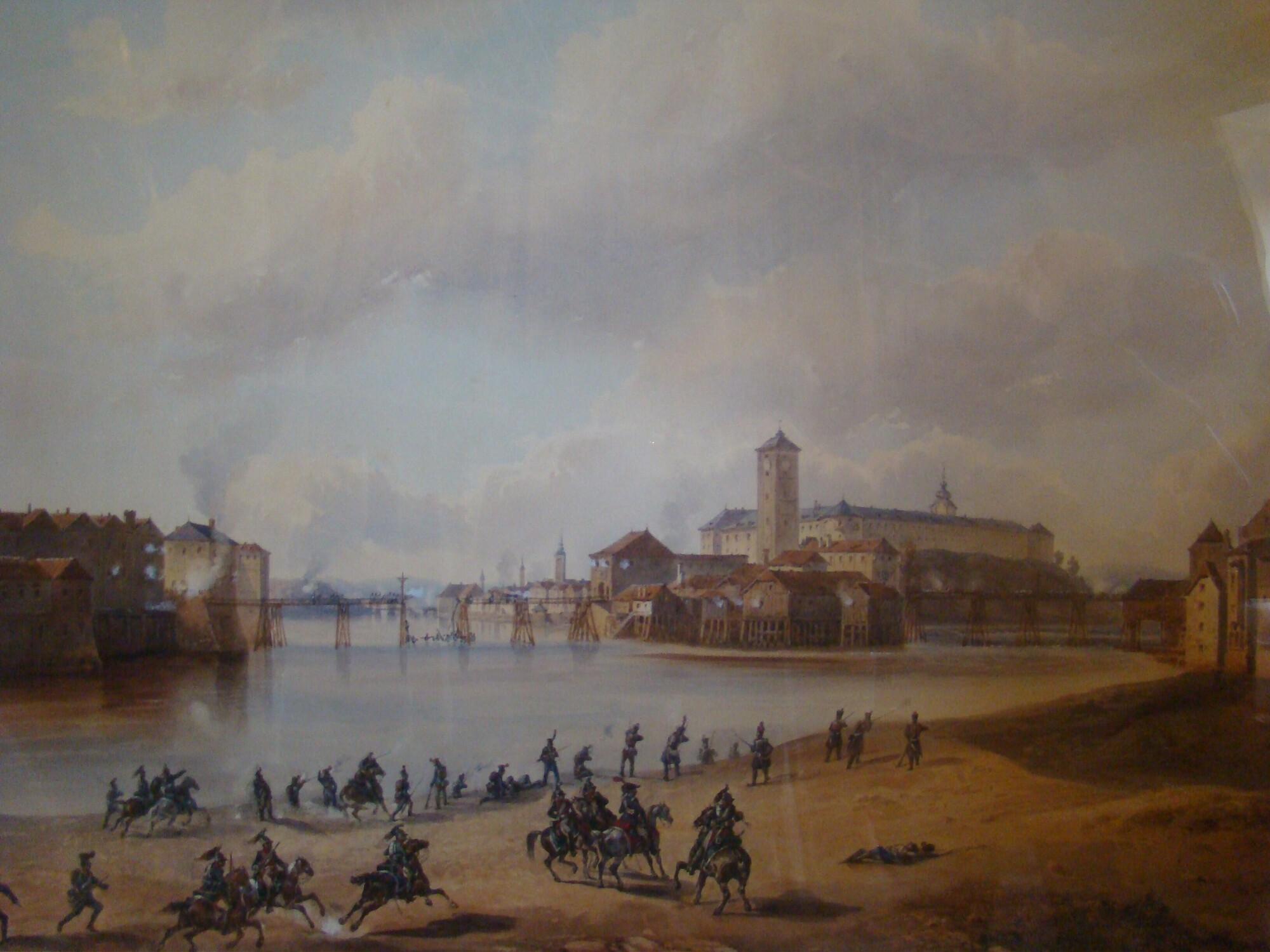
- Battle of Steyr by Siméon Fort, 1835
Date	4 November 1805
Location	Steyr
Result	French victory

Belligerents
France	(Holy Roman Empire) Habsburg Empire (Russian Empire) Russia

Commanders and leaders
(France) Louis-Nicolas Davout	(Holy Roman Empire) Maximilian, Count of Merveldt

Strength
3,000	4,000

Casualties and losses
Unknown	2,000

War of the Third Coalition:
Austria
current battle
Napoleon in command
Napoleon not in command

Battle of Steyr (French: Bataille de Steyr; German: Schlacht bei Steyr) was fought on 4 November 1805 between the French army under the command of Louis-Nicolas Davout and the Austrian army under the command of General Maximilian, Count of Merveldt during the War of the Third Coalition. It ended in French victory.

== Background ==
The Gyulai regiment took part in the battle from Austria; On the French side, he was opposed by the 13th Light Infantry Regiment and the 30th Infantry Regiment (parts of the Third Corps of the French Army).

After the victory, Davout managed to cross the Enns River and resume the "march to Vienna". Already November 5 the Battle of Amstetten will begin

== Sources ==
- Sur les pas de la Grande Armée — 1805, page 165
