= Louis-Nicolas Davout =

French Marshal (1770–1823)

Marshal of the Empire Louis-Nicolas Davout Duke of Auerstaedt, Prince of Eckmühl
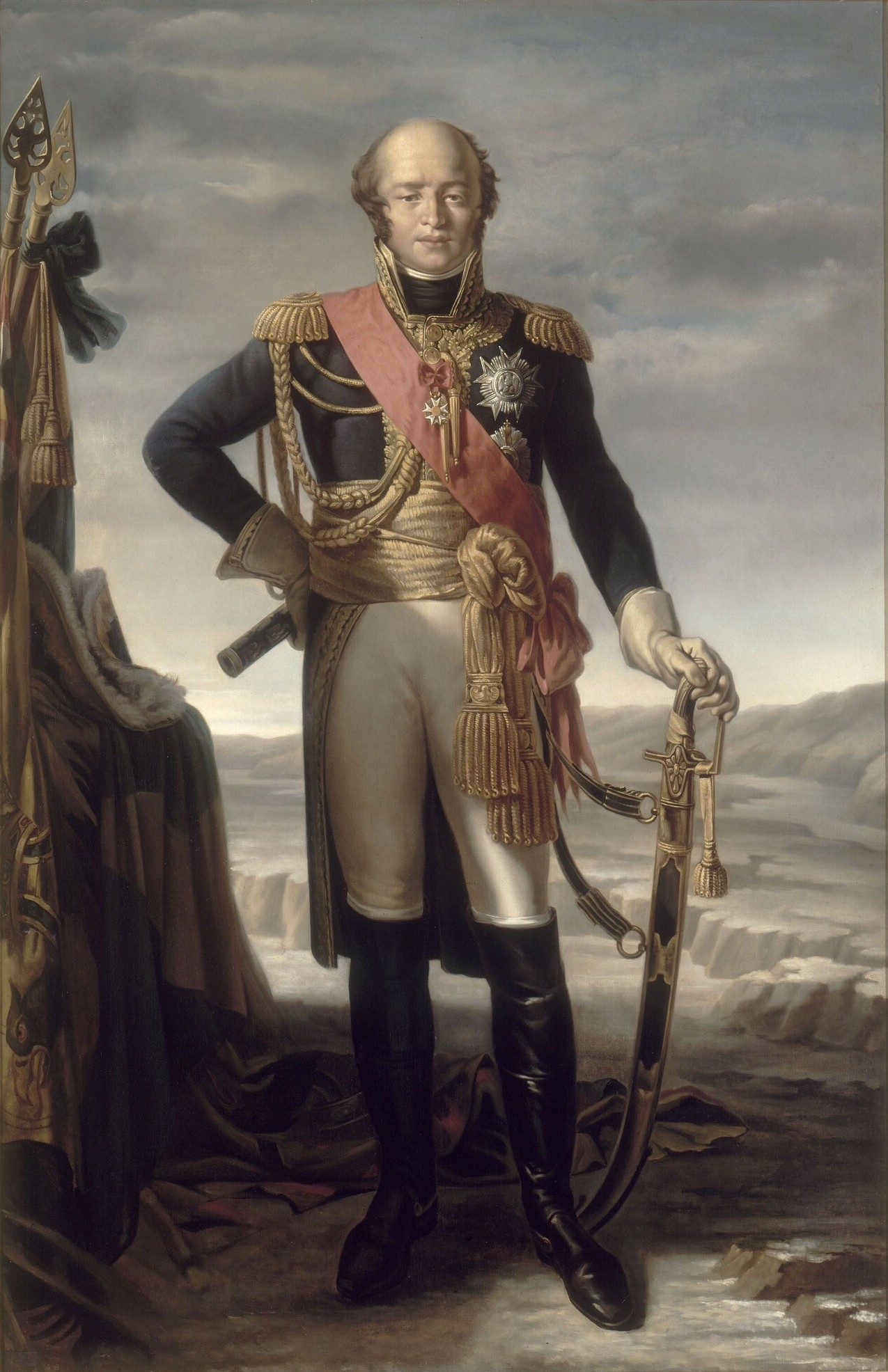
- Portrait by Tito Marzocchi de Bellucci, c. 1852

Minister of War of the Hundred Days Empire
- In office 20 March 1815 – 9 July 1815
- Monarchs: Napoleon I Napoleon II; Louis XVIII
- Preceded by: Henri Jacques Guillaume Clarke
- Succeeded by: Laurent de Gouvion Saint-Cyr

Governor-general of the Duchy of Warsaw
- In office 15 July 1807 – 1809

Mayor of Savigny-sur-Orge
- In office 8 October 1822 – 1 June 1823

Personal details
- Born: 10 May 1770 Annoux, Kingdom of France
- Died: 1 June 1823 (aged 53) Paris, Kingdom of France
- Resting place: Père Lachaise Cemetery
- Children: 8, including Napoléon-Louis and Adélaïde-Louise
- Awards: Legion of Honour
- Nickname: The Iron Marshal

Military service
- Allegiance: France
- Branch/service: Army
- Years of service: 1788–1815
- Rank: Marshal of the Empire
- Commands: I Corps; III Corps; XIII Corps; General inspector of cavalry; Consular Guard Grenadiers; Observation Corps of the Elbe
- Battles/wars: See battles: French Revolutionary Wars; War of the First Coalition; Battle of Jemappes; Battle of Neerwinden; Siege of Kehl; War of the Second Coalition; French campaign in Egypt and Syria; Battle of Abukir; Napoleonic Wars; War of the Third Coalition; Ulm Campaign; Battle of Steyr; Battle of Austerlitz; War of the Fourth Coalition; Battle of Jena–Auerstedt; Capitulation of Küstrin; Battle of Czarnowo; Battle of Golymin; Battle of Eylau; War of the Fifth Coalition; Battle of Teugen-Hausen; Battle of Eckmühl; Battle of Ratisbon; Battle of Wagram; French invasion of Russia; Battle of Saltanovka; Battle of Smolensk; Battle of Borodino; Battle of Maloyaroslavets; Battle of Vyazma; Battle of Krasnoi; Battle of Berezina; War of the Sixth Coalition; Siege of Hamburg; Hundred Days; Defense of Paris

Louis-Nicolas d'Avout (English: /dəˈvuː/ duh-VOO, French: [lwi nikɔla davu]; 10 May 1770 – 1 June 1823), better known as Davout, 1st Prince of Eckmühl, 1st Duke of Auerstaedt, was a French military commander and Marshal of the Empire who served during both the French Revolutionary Wars and the Napoleonic Wars. His talent for war, along with his reputation as a stern disciplinarian, earned him the nickname "The Iron Marshal" (Le Maréchal de fer). He is ranked as one of Napoleon's finest commanders, and also stands among the most outstanding military commanders of the modern era.

Born into a minor noble family in Burgundy, Davout was educated at the École Militaire and joined a royal cavalry regiment in 1788. On the outbreak of the French Revolution, Davout embraced the revolutionary cause and first distinguished himself at the Battle of Neerwinden. Rapidly rising through the ranks, he took part in the 1796 Rhine campaign and Napoleon's Egyptian expedition, and by 1800 he had reached the rank of divisional general.

Davout was named one of the original 18 Marshals of the Empire upon Napoleon's ascension as Emperor in 1804. As commander of the III Corps of the Grande Armée, he played a major role in the French victory at Austerlitz. He achieved further successes at Auerstedt—where he routed the Prussian army of the Duke of Brunswick despite being vastly outnumbered—as well as Eylau, Eckmühl and Wagram. In 1807, Napoleon named him governor-general of the Duchy of Warsaw and granted him the title Duke of Auerstaedt. Davout took part in Napoleon's disastrous invasion of Russia, and was in the middle of a six-month siege of Hamburg when Napoleon abdicated.

Davout went into retirement upon the First Restoration of the Bourbons. He rejoined Napoleon during the Hundred Days and was appointed Minister of War, but did not receive a field command. Following Napoleon's final defeat at Waterloo, he held Paris until July when he ultimately submitted to the again restored Bourbon monarchy, after which he was exiled and deprived of his titles. In 1819, his titles were restored and he was made a Peer of France.

== Early life ==
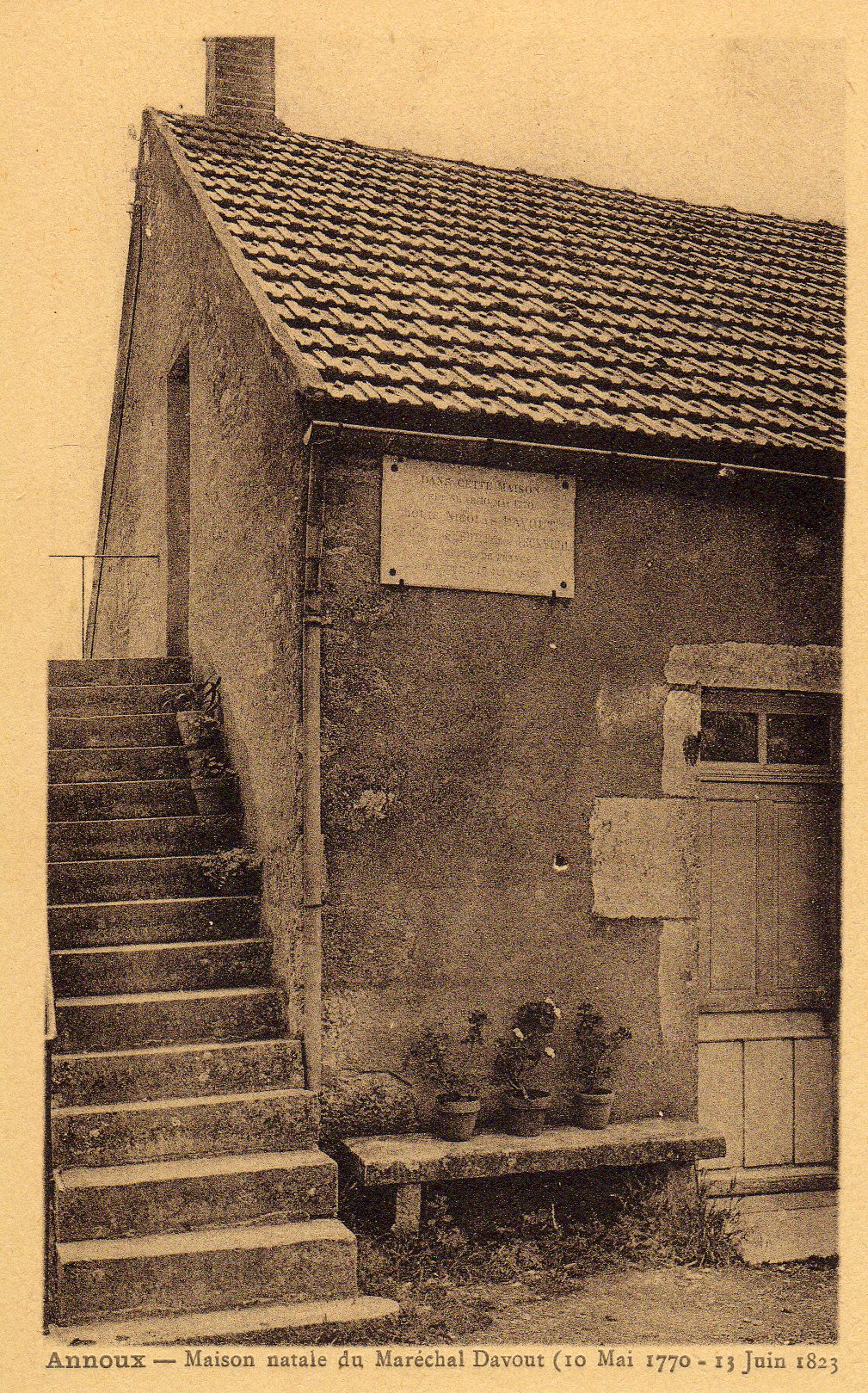
Davout's birthplace in Annoux

Davout was born in the small village of Annoux, Yonne, in Burgundy, as the eldest son of Jean-François d'Avout (1739–1779), a cavalry officer and his wife (married in 1768), Françoise-Adélaïde Minard de Velars (1741–1810). The d'Avout family was an impoverished minor nobility with a tradition of military service. Because Davout was the eldest he was expected to also have the same career. So despite the family's economic problems, Davout was still educated in the nearby Brienne-le-Chateau, in their military academy also attended by Napoleon, before also transferring to the École Militaire in Paris on 29 September 1785. He graduated on 19 February 1788 and was appointed a sous-lieutenant in the Royal-Champagne Cavalry Regiment in garrison at Hesdin (Pas-de-Calais).

== French Revolutionary Wars ==
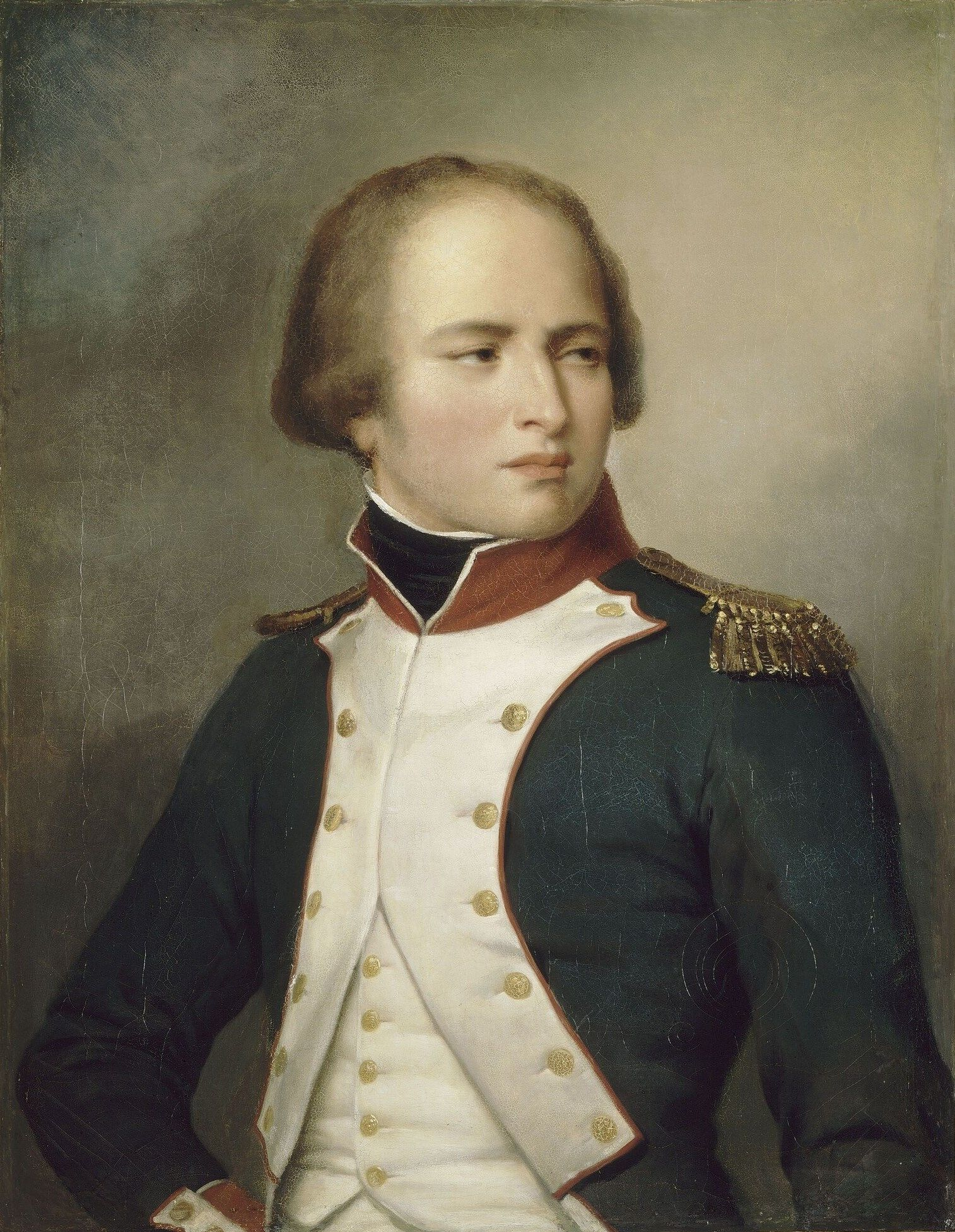
Louis-Nicolas Davout, lieutenant-colonel of the 3rd battalion of Yonne in 1792, by Alexis-Nicolas Pérignon (1834)

On the outbreak of the French Revolution, Davout embraced its principles. He was chef de bataillon in a volunteer corps in the campaign of 1792, and distinguished himself at the Battle of Neerwinden the following spring. He had just been promoted to general of brigade when he was removed from the active list because of his noble birth. After he divorced his wife in 1794 he served in the Rhine campaign of 1796, and accompanied General Louis Desaix in the Egyptian expedition of Napoleon Bonaparte.

On his return, he did not take part in the Battle of Marengo, where his friend Desaix was killed while making a decisive contribution to the victory. Napoleon, who had great confidence in his abilities, finally promoted him to general of division and arranged his marriage to his sister Pauline's sister-in-law Aimée Leclerc, thus making him part of Napoleon's extended family, and gave him a command in the grenadiers of the Consular Guard.

== Napoleonic Wars ==
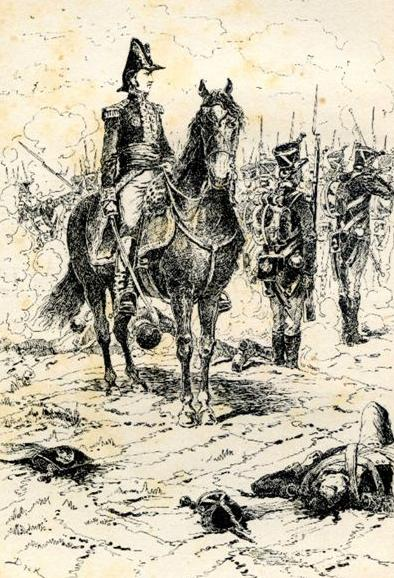
Davout at the Battle of Auerstedt, by Dick de Lonlay

At the ascension of Napoleon as Emperor in 1804, Davout was named as one of the original 18 Marshals of the Empire. Davout was the youngest and least experienced of the generals promoted to marshal, which earned him the hostility of other generals throughout his career. On 18 June 1805 he was present at the Battle of Blanc-Nez and Gris-Nez after joining a Batavian flotilla, headed for Boulogne, as an observer.

As commander of the III Corps of the Grande Armée, Davout rendered his greatest services. At the Battle of Austerlitz, following a forced march of 48 hours to fall on the left flank of the Russian army, the III Corps bore the brunt of the allies' attack. In the subsequent War of the Fourth Coalition, Davout, with a single corps, with the intention to fall on the Prussian left wing, fought and won the Battle of Auerstädt against the main Prussian Army, under the Duke of Brunswick, which had more than twice as many soldiers at its disposal (more than 63,000, to Davout's 28,000). His actions in this battle earned him the nickname 'Iron Marshal'. Napoleon after hearing reports about the alleged battle would mock Davout, telling his aide-de-camp "your Marshal must've been seeing double", mocking Davout's spectacle wearing. Historian François-Guy Hourtoulle writes: "At Jena, Napoleon won a battle he could not lose. At Auerstädt, Davout won a battle he could not win". As a reward, Napoleon let Davout and his men enter Berlin first on 25 October 1806.

Davout added to his renown in the battle of Eylau. Napoleon left him as governor-general of the newly created Duchy of Warsaw following the Treaties of Tilsit in 1807, and the next year awarded him with the title of Duke of Auerstädt. During the War of the Fifth Coalition in 1809, Davout took part in the Battle of Eckmühl, and also distinguished himself in the Battle of Wagram, where he commanded the right wing. He was later made Prince of Eckmühl following the campaign. In 1810 Davout travelled to Compiègne with Napoleon to collect the 18-year-old bride Marie-Louise of Austria.

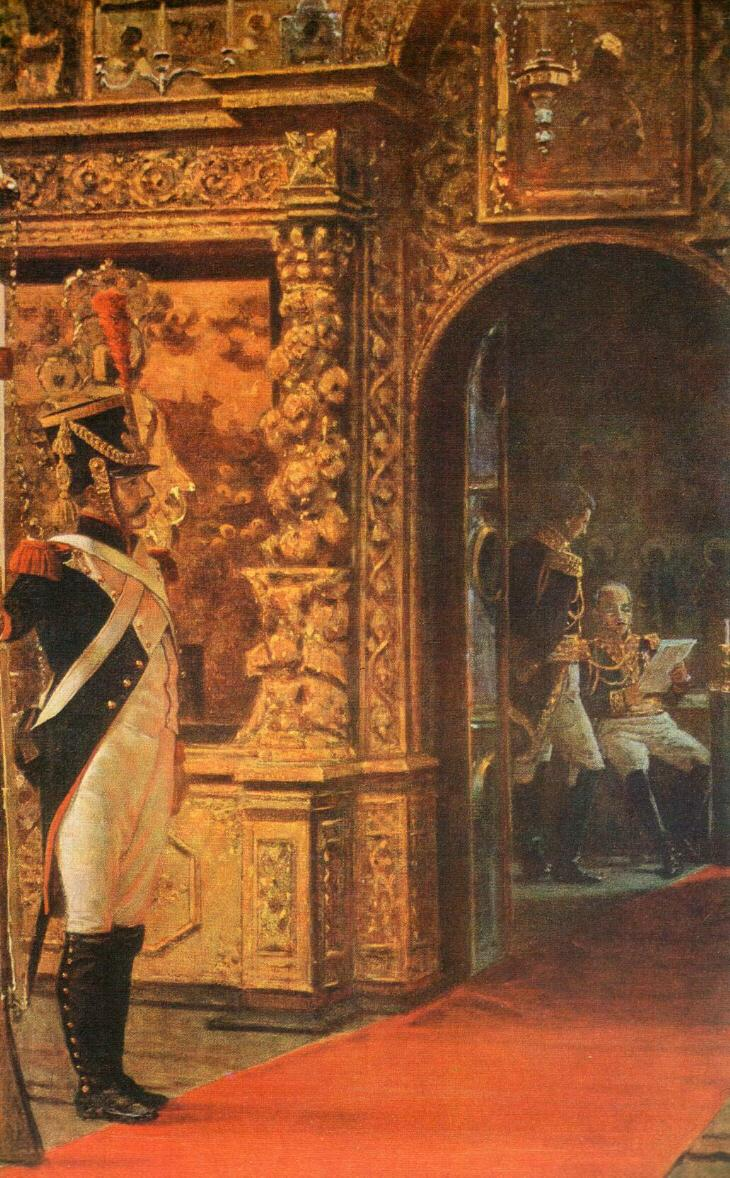
Marshal Davout in Chudov Monastery of Moscow Kremlin, by Vasili Vereshchagin

In 1810 he was sent to Hamburg when Marshal Jean Baptiste Jules Bernadotte left for Sweden; Davout was entrusted by Napoleon with the task of organizing the "corps of observation of the Elbe", which would become the gigantic army with which Napoleon invaded Russia in 1812. In this, he commanded the I Corps, the strongest corps, numbering over 70,000. On 1 July he left Vilnius. On the order of Napoleon Davout secretly took over the command of Jérôme Bonaparte, occupied Minsk but had lost a third of his men due to sickness and desertion. Davout went very far in humiliating the 33rd regiment, which was no exception. He defeated the Russians at Mohilev before he joined the main army at Smolensk, with which he continued throughout the campaign. During the retreat from Moscow he conducted the rear guard, which was exhausted by food shortage and deemed too slow by the emperor, so Davout was replaced by Marshal Michel Ney in the Battle of Vyazma. His inability to hold out against general Mikhail Miloradovich in the Battle of Krasnoi, threatened his forces with destruction, until the arrival of the Old Guard led by Édouard Mortier. Davout managed to successfully cross the Losvinka brook, albeit at the cost of his rearguard's sacrifice. Davout's jammed carriages, fell into the hands of the Cossacks. Among the booty captured by the Russians were Davout's war chest, a plethora of maps of the Middle East, Central Asia and India, and Davout's Marshal baton. The loss of his baton led him into disgrace and he would not meet with the Emperor again until his return from Elba.

In April 1813, on his return from Russia with 4,000, the remains of 70,000 men, Davout commanded the military district of Hamburg and Dirk van Hogendorp left. (The French had initially been driven out by the Russians in March 1813.) He defended the poorly fortified and provisioned city, through the long Siege of Hamburg, only surrendering on direct order by King Louis XVIII, who had come to the throne after Napoleon's abdication in April 1814. The French restored their authority with many reprisals among the population. During the siege, he expelled up to 25,000 of Hamburg's poorest citizens out of the city into the cold winter, many of whom perished of cold and starvation. Between 1806 and 1814, when the French occupation came to an end by Davout's surrender, the population decreased by nearly one-half, to 55,000.

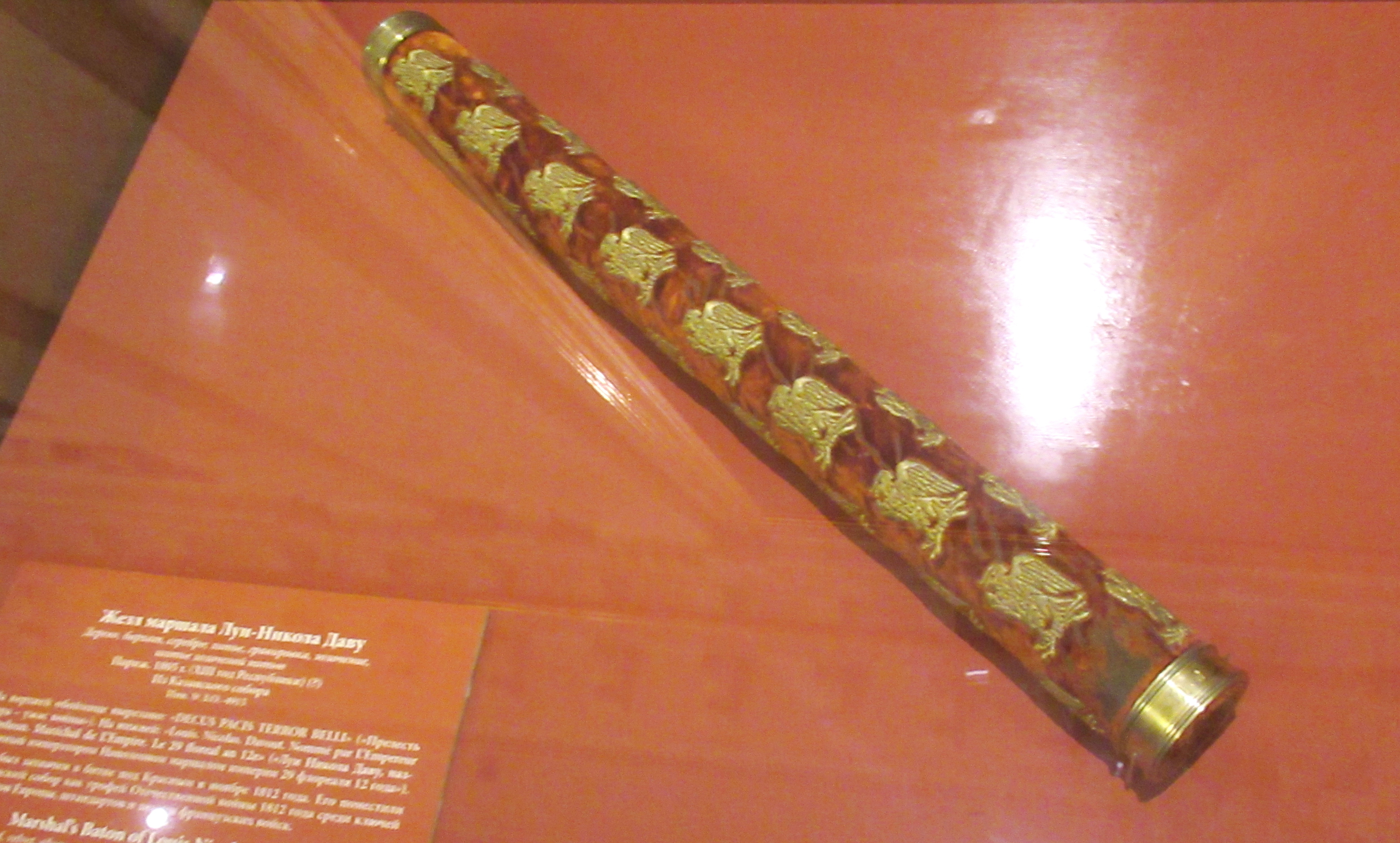
Copy of Davout's baton (Hermitage)

Davout's military character has been interpreted as cruel and he had to defend himself against many attacks upon his conduct at Hamburg. He was a stern disciplinarian, who exacted rigid and precise obedience from his troops, and consequently his corps was more trustworthy and exact in the performance of its duty than any other. For example, Davout forbade his troops from plundering enemy villages, a policy he would enforce by the use of the death penalty. Thus, in the early days of the Grande Armée, the III Corps tended to be entrusted with the most difficult work. He was regarded by his contemporaries as one of the ablest of Napoleon's marshals.

=== Hundred Days ===
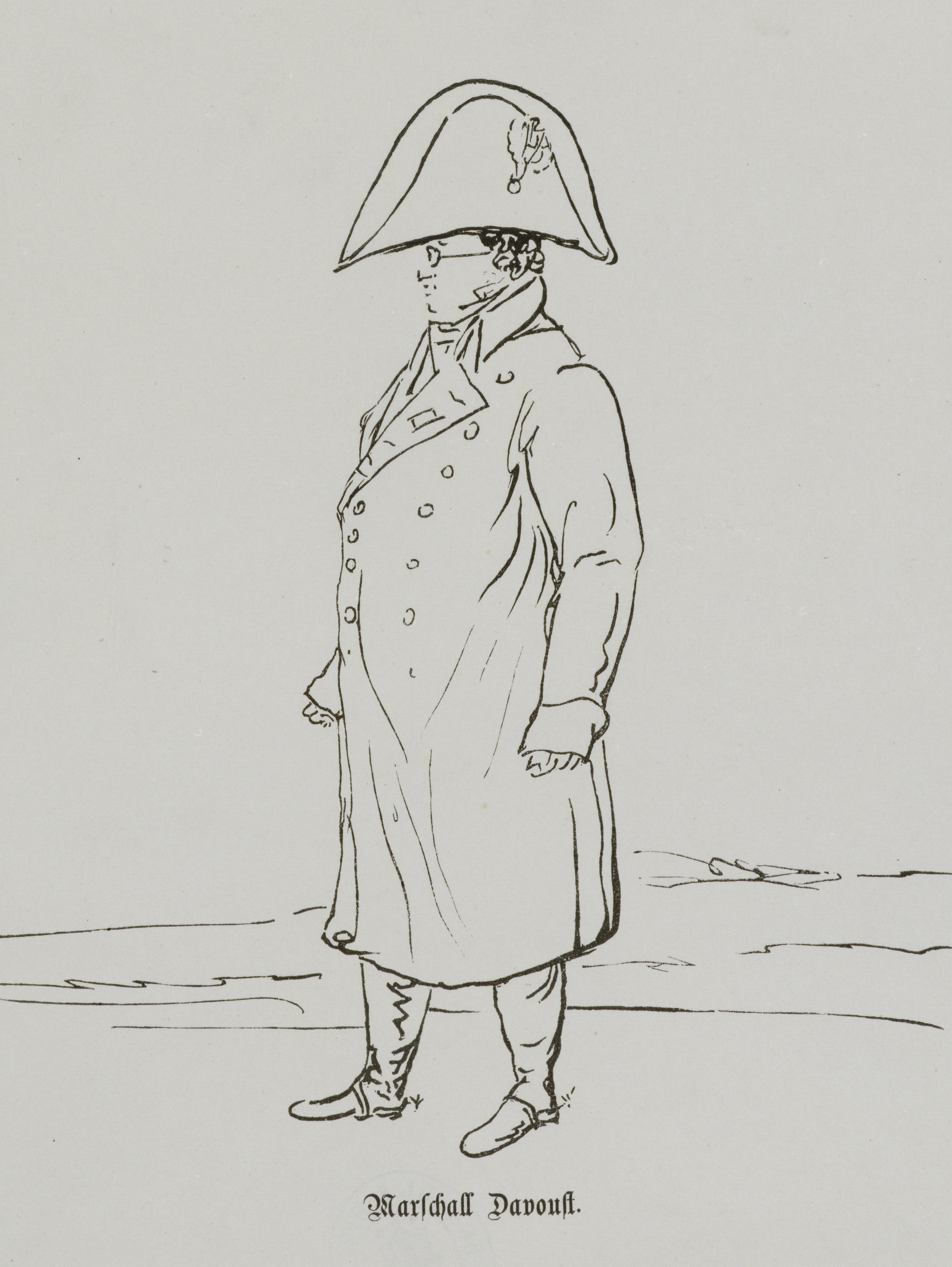
Marshal Davout in Hamburg (1813)

Upon the first restoration of the Bourbon monarchy, he retired into private life, openly displaying his hostility to the Bourbons, and when Napoleon returned from Elba, Davout rejoined him. Appointed Minister of War, he reorganized the French Army insofar as time permitted, and he was so indispensable to the war department that Napoleon kept him in Paris during the Waterloo campaign. To what degree his skill and bravery would have altered the fortunes of the campaign of 1815 can only be surmised, but Napoleon has been criticized for his failure to avail himself in the field of the services of the best general he then possessed.

Davout directed the gallant, but hopeless, defense of Paris after the Battle of Waterloo. He received the command of the army assembled under the walls of Paris, and would have fought, had he not received the order of the provisional government to negotiate with the enemy. On 24 June 1815, Davout was sent by Joseph Fouché, the president of the provisional government, to the dethroned emperor at the Élysée Palace with a request to quit Paris, where his continued presence could lead to trouble and public danger. Napoleon received him coldly but left Paris the next day and resided at Château de Malmaison until 29 June when he departed for Rochfort. In later years, Napoleon said of Davout bitterly that "he betrayed me too. He has a wife and children; he thought that all was lost; he wanted to keep what he had got," while on another occasion he remarked that, "I thought that Davout loved me, but he loved only France." Subsequently, Davout retired with the army beyond the Loire and made his submission to the restored Bourbon monarchy on 14 July, and within a few days gave up his command to Marshal Étienne MacDonald.

== Later life ==
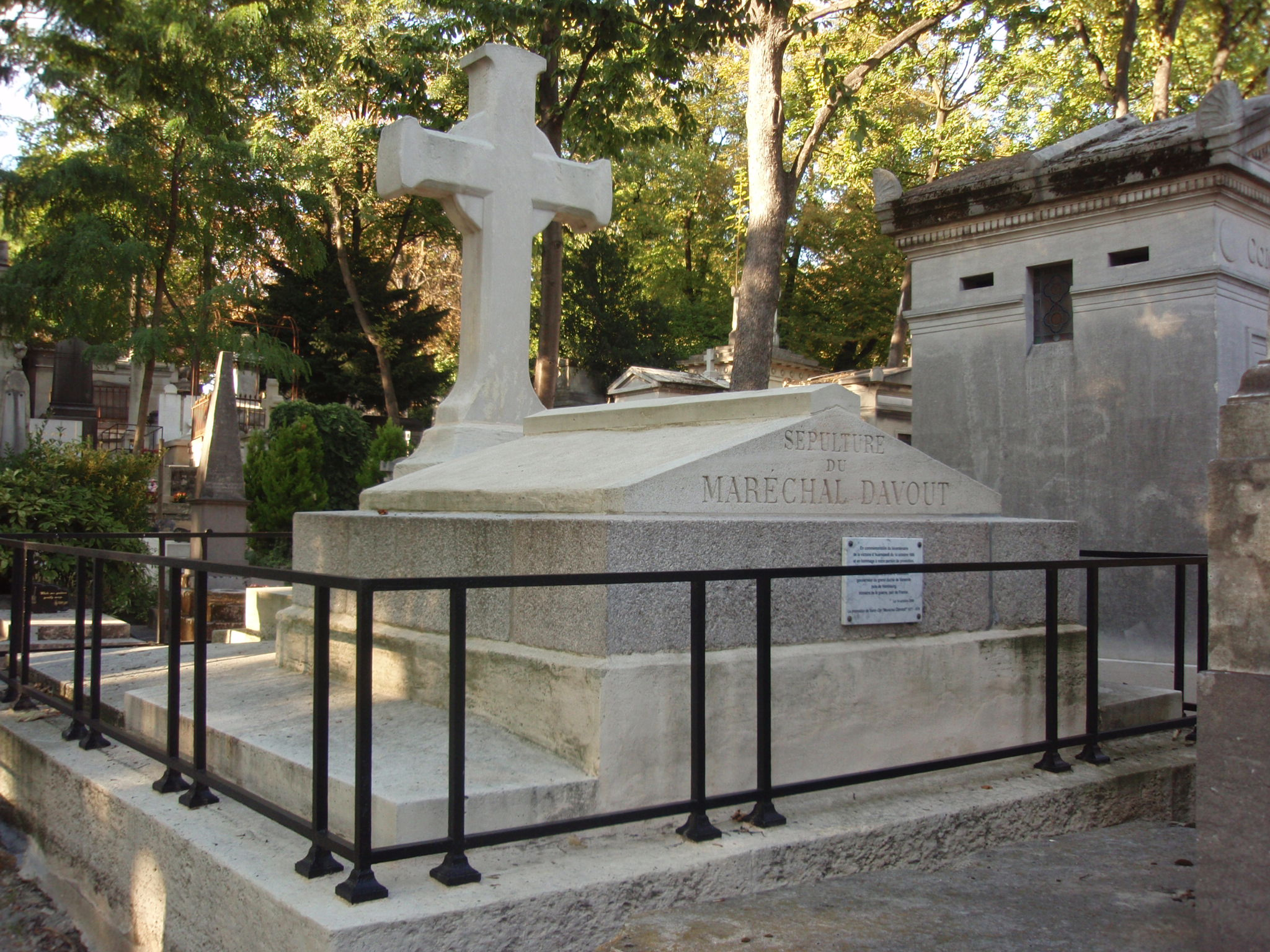
Davout's tomb at the Père Lachaise Cemetery in Paris

Upon the second restoration, Davout was deprived of his titles and was exiled to Louviers on 27 December 1815. When some of his subordinate generals were proscribed, he demanded to be held responsible for their acts, as executed under his orders, and he endeavoured to prevent the execution of Ney. After half a year, the hostility of the Bourbons towards Davout faded and he became reconciled to the monarchy. In 1817, his rank and titles were restored and in 1819, he became a member of the Chamber of Peers.

In 1822, Davout was elected mayor of Savigny-sur-Orge, an office he held for a year. His son Louis-Napoléon was also mayor of the city from 1843 to 1846. A main square bears their name in the city, as does a boulevard in Paris.

Davout died in Paris on 1 June 1823. His remains rest in the Père Lachaise Cemetery, where an elaborate tomb marks his grave.

== Honours and awards ==
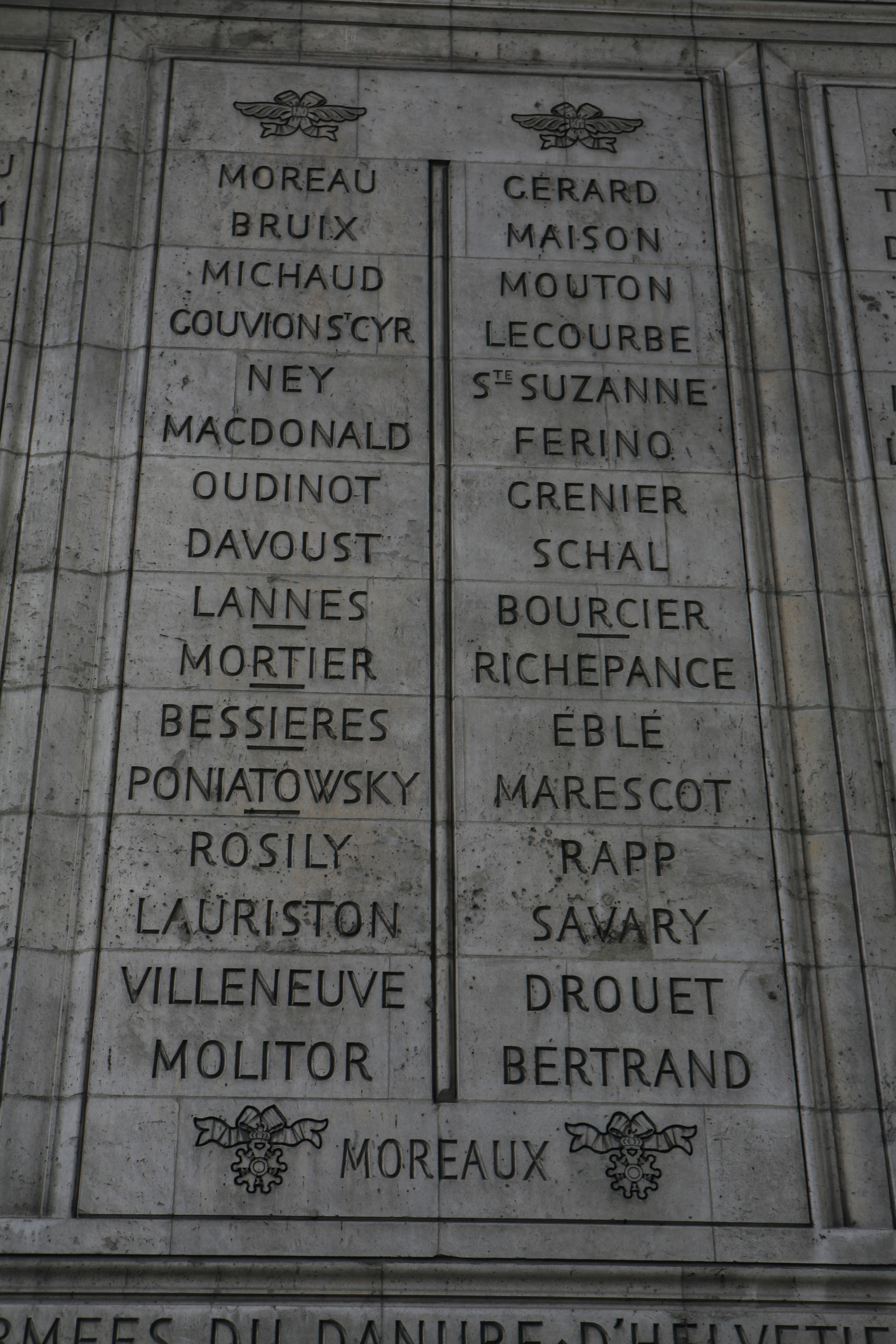
Davout's name, written as Davoust, appears on the Arc de Triomphe, eastern pillar, column 14.

Davout held the following honours and awards:

- Knight Grand Cross of the Order of the Legion of Honour
- Knight of the Order of the Iron Crown
- Grand Cross and Star of the Virtuti Militari
- Knight Grand Cross of the Order of the White Eagle
- Knight of the Order of Christ
- Knight Grand Cross of the Military Order of St. Henry
- Knight Grand Cross of the Military Order of Max Joseph
- Knight Grand Cross of the Royal Order of St. Stephen of Hungary
- Knight of the Military Order of Maria Theresa
- Knight Grand Cross of the Order of the Elephant

== Personal life ==
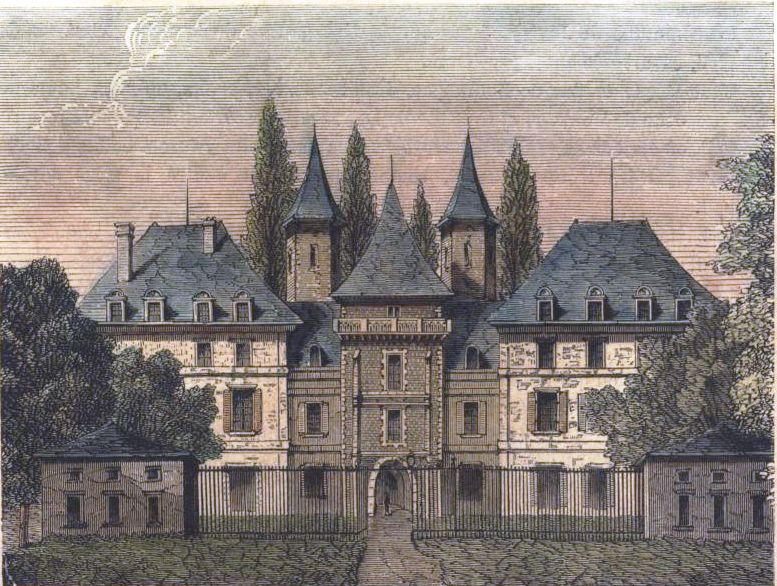
Château de Savigny-sur-Orge, owned by Davout from 1802

Davout was known as a methodical person in both military and personal affairs. Within the army and among his social peers, he was often considered cold and distant; while respected, he was not well-liked. During times of peace, he preferred to spend time with his family and care for his home, rather than cultivate his high social standing.

Because of his stubborn personality and limited social skills, he developed many enemies and antagonists within the army's officer corps, notably Jean-Baptiste Bernadotte, Joachim Murat (with whom he clashed strongly during the 1812 campaign), Louis-Alexandre Berthier and Baron Thiébault (who would harshly criticize Davout in his memoirs).

Perhaps his fiercest anger was directed towards Bernadotte, who he perceived to have failed to come to his aid at Auerstedt, though close enough to observe the smoke and hear the cannon fire. His anger was so intense that Davout requested to settle the matter with a personal duel, averted only by Napoleon's personal intervention. Bernadotte was eventually sent back to Paris in disgrace after being caught by Napoleon retreating without orders at the battle of Wagram. Bernadotte then caught the eye of the Swedish ambassador, looking for a well-connected French officer to take on the role of heir to the Swedish throne. When Sweden threw in her lot against Napoleon in the War of the Sixth Coalition, Davout personally asked to be placed opposite Bernadotte's contingent, in order to gain retribution for the latter's betrayal. But with Davout assigned to defend Hamburg (which he did, up to and beyond Napoleon's abdication), they never did face each other in battle.

Of the other Marshals, Davout had the best relations with Michel Ney, Edouard Mortier, Nicolas Charles Oudinot and Laurent Gouvion Saint-Cyr. His best friend was possibly Charles-Étienne Gudin de La Sablonnière, one of his subordinates, who was killed in battle in 1812.. Also, he was friends with Louis Desaix, who was killed at the Battle of Marengo.

=== Family ===
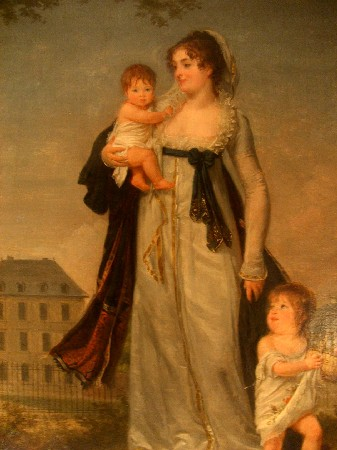
Aimée Leclerc with two daughters

Davout was also noted for his loyalty to his long-time second wife Louise Aimée Julie Davout (née Leclerc, sister of Charles Leclerc and sister-in-law of Pauline Bonaparte) (Pontoise, 19 June 1782 – Paris, 17 December 1868), whom he married in 1801 and who remained with him until his death. Their marriage was loving and the couple seem to have been faithful to each other despite very long periods of separation. They had eight children, four of whom died in childhood:

- Paul (1802–1803)
- Joséphine (1804–1805)
- Antoinette Joséphine (1805 – 19 August 1821), married in 1820 to Achille, Comte Félix-Vigier (1801–1868)
- Adèle Napoleone (June 1807 – 21 January 1885), married on 14 March 1827 to Étienne, Comte de Cambacérès (1804 – 20 December 1878)
- Napoleon (1809–1810)
- Napoleon Louis, 2nd Duke of Auerstedt, 2nd and last Prince of Eckmühl (6 January 1811 – 13 June 1853), who died unmarried and without issue
- Jules (1812–1813)
- Adelaide-Louise (8 July 1815 – 6 October 1892), married on 17 August 1835 to François-Edmond de Couliboeuf, Marquis de Blocqueville (1789–1861)

The title of duke went to the descendants of Louis-Nicolas' brother Charles Isidor (1774–1854) by his marriage in 1824 to Claire de Cheverry (1804–1895). He also had a sister Julie (1771–1846), married in 1801 to Marc-Antoine Bonnin de La Bonninière, 1st Count de Beaumont (1763–1830), and another brother, Alexandre-Louis-Edme, 1st Baron d'Avout (1773–1820), married in 1808 to Alire Parisot (1786–1856). The youngest daughter, Adelaide-Louise, marquise de Blocqueville, left provision in her will for the name of her father to be given to a lighthouse. In 1897, the Phare d'Eckmühl was opened on the headland of Penmarc'h in Brittany.

Political offices
Preceded by Henri Jacques Guillaume Clarke	Minister of War; 20 March 1815 – 7 July 1815	Succeeded by Laurent, marquis de Gouvion Saint-Cyr
French nobility
Preceded by New creation	Duke of Auerstaedt; 1808-1823	Succeeded by Napoleon Louis Davout
