= Penmarc'h Lighthouse =

Lighthouse in Penmarch, France

Phare d'Eckmühl
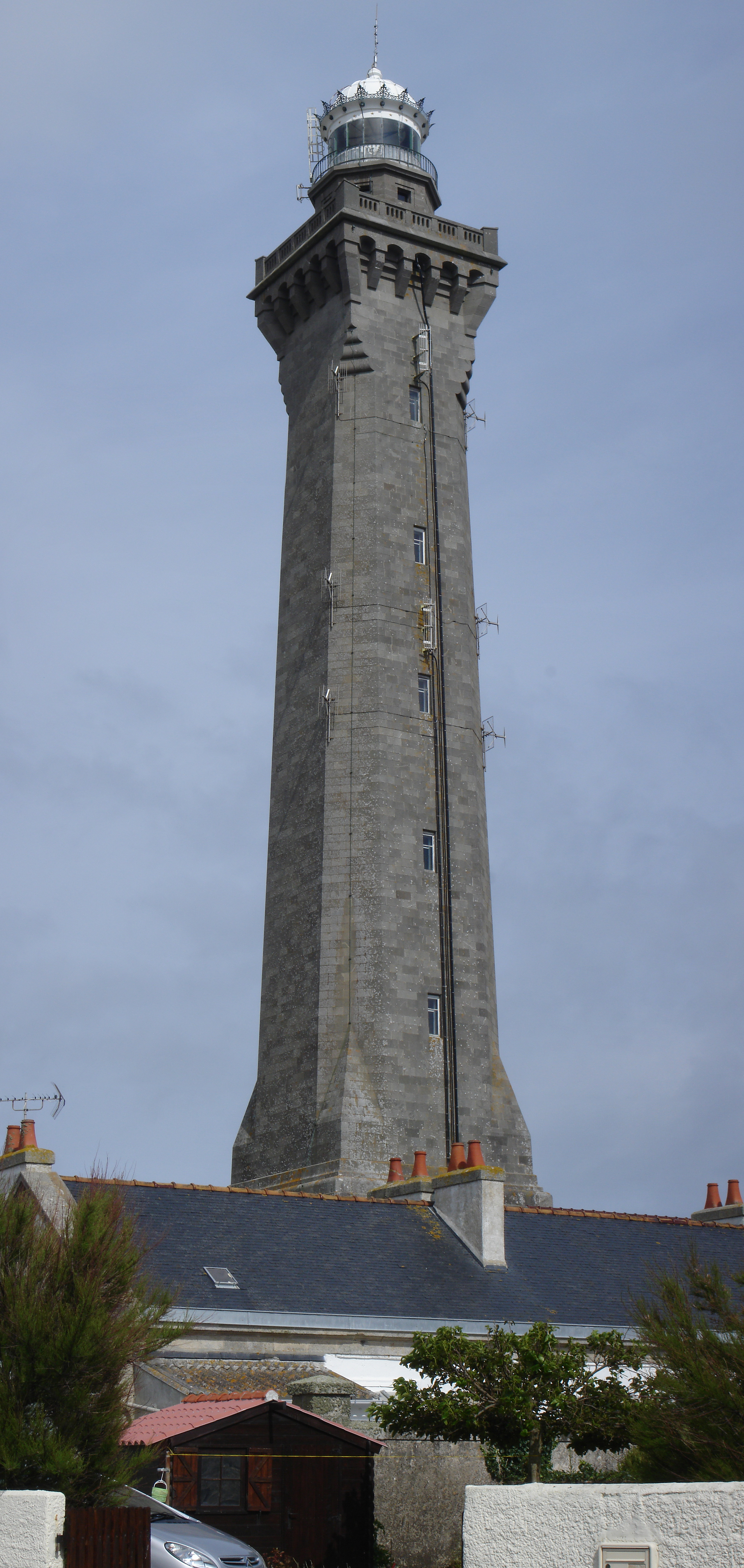
- Phare d'Eckmühl, 2007
- Location: Penmarch, France
- Coordinates: 47°47′53.9″N 4°22′21.9″W

Tower
- Constructed: 1897
- Construction: granite
- Automated: 17 October 2007
- Height: 213 feet (65 m)
- Shape: square tower, octagonal watch room, gallery, lantern
- Markings: unpainted gray tower, white lantern
- Heritage: classified historical monument
- Fog signal: Horn: 1 bl. ev. 60s

Light
- First lit: 1897
- Focal height: 197 feet (60 m)
- Lens: Fresnel lens
- Range: 23 nautical miles (43 km; 26 mi)
- Characteristic: Fl W 5s

The Phare d'Eckmühl, also known as Point Penmarc'h Light or Saint-Pierre Light, is an active lighthouse in Penmarc'h, Finistère department, Brittany, France. At a height of 213 feet (65 m) it is one of the tallest lighthouses in the world. It is located at the port of Saint-Pierre, on Point Penmarc'h, on the southwestern corner of Finistère and the northwestern entrance to the Bay of Biscay.

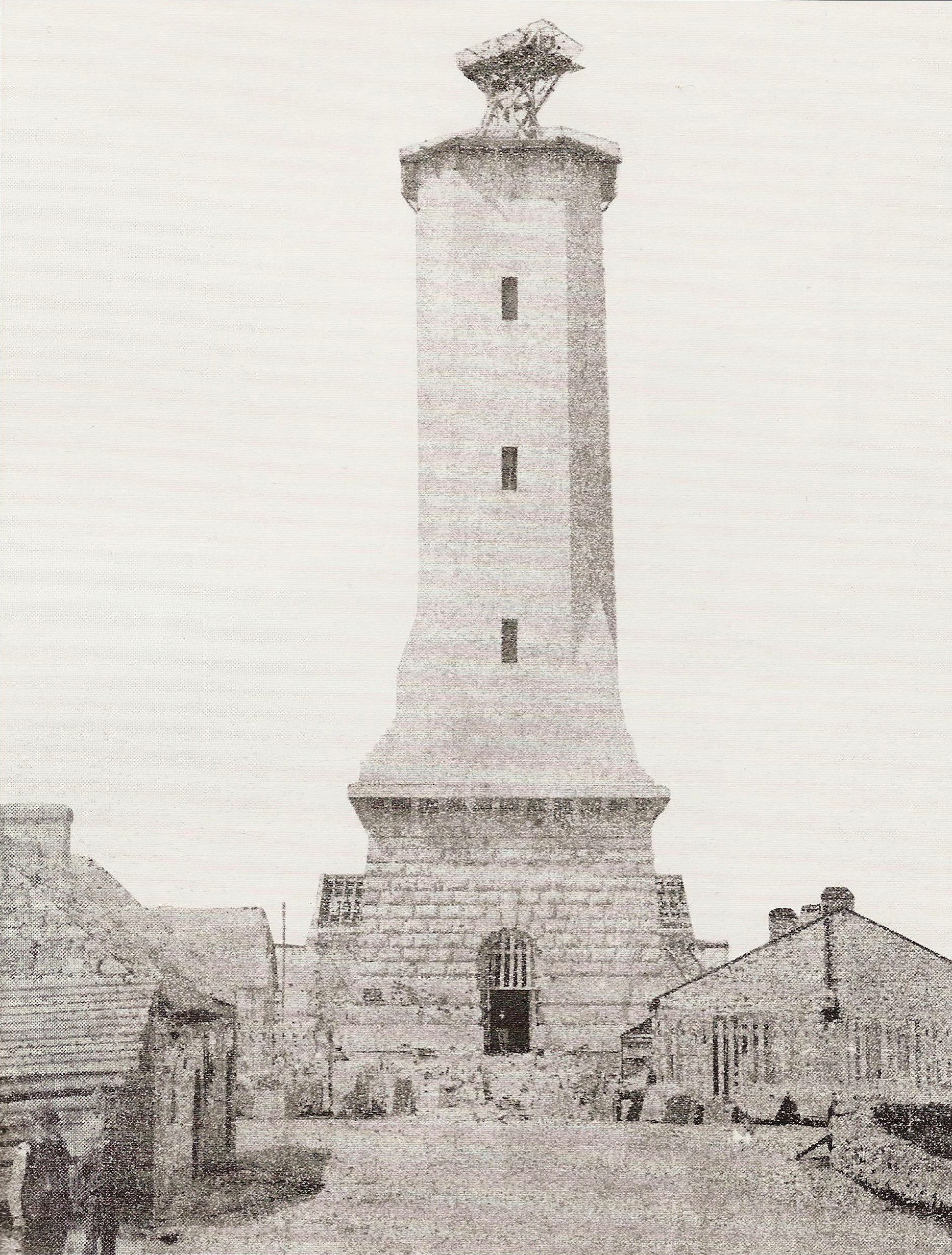
Phare d'Eckmühl during construction in 1895

The tower was built following a decision on April 3, 1882 to modernize the coastal lighthouses and raise the focal height of the Penmarc'h lighthouse, built in 1835, to 60m. However, engineers reported that the old tower could not support such an extension, so in 1890 it was decided to build a new lighthouse, the plans of which were completed on April 3, 1882. Funding came unexpectedly on 9 December 1892 when Adélaïde-Louise Davout, Marquise de Blocqueville, left substantial funds for the new tower in her will, provided the lighthouse was dedicated to the memory of her father, a marshal of the First French Empire Louis Nicolas Davout, who was "Prince d'Eckmühl", a title he won after the Battle of Eckmühl. The tower was inaugurated on October 17, 1897.

The centennial of the lighthouse was celebrated in 1997.

The tower is open to the public. Reaching the top takes climbing 307 steps, 227 stone steps followed by an iron staircase.

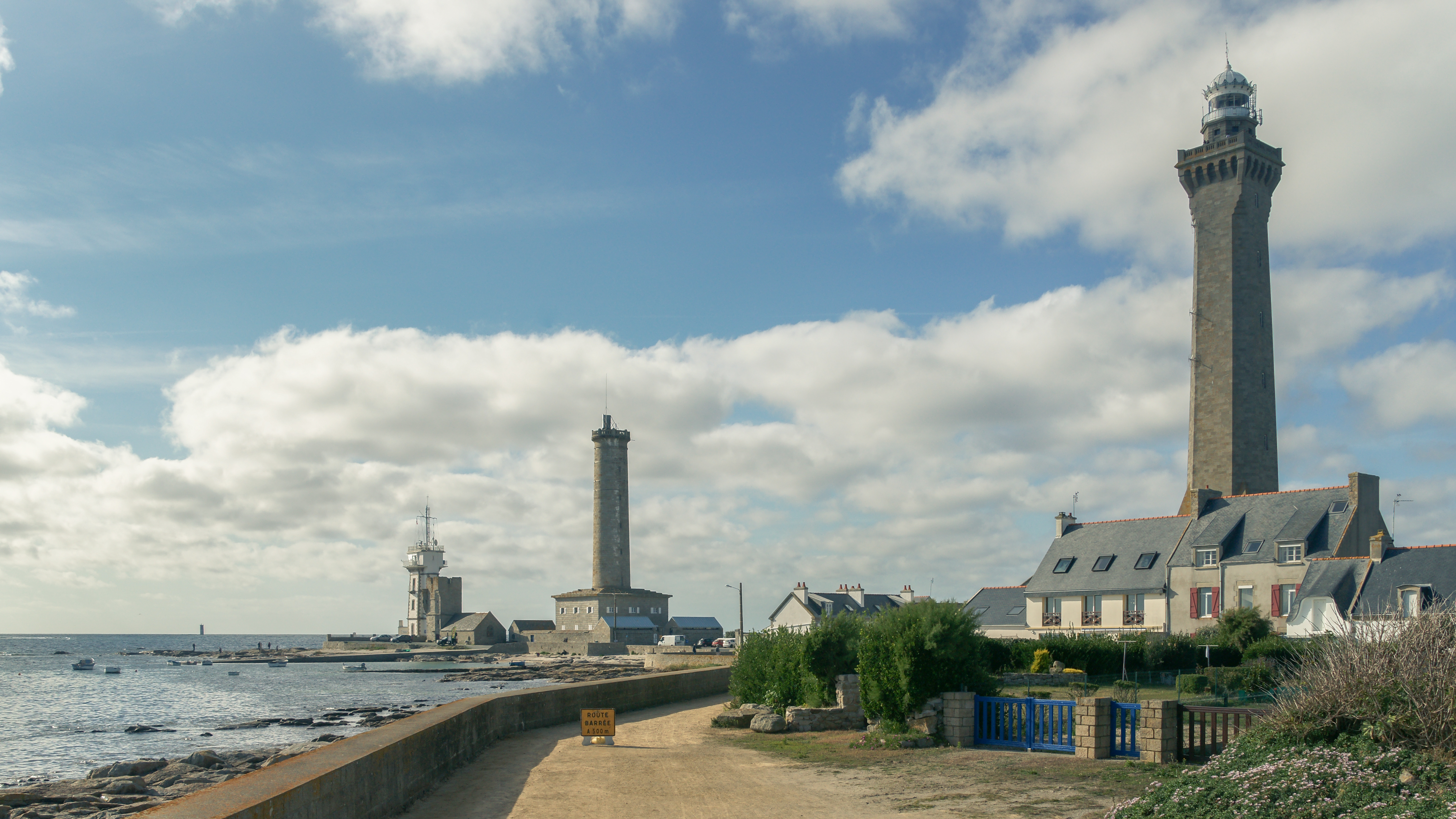
Chronology of lighthouses at Pointe de Saint-Pierre from left to right: „Vieille tour", Phare de Penmarc’h and Phare d'Eckmühl

== See also ==
- List of tallest lighthouses in the world
- List of lighthouses in France
