= Adélaïde-Louise d'Eckmühl de Blocqueville =

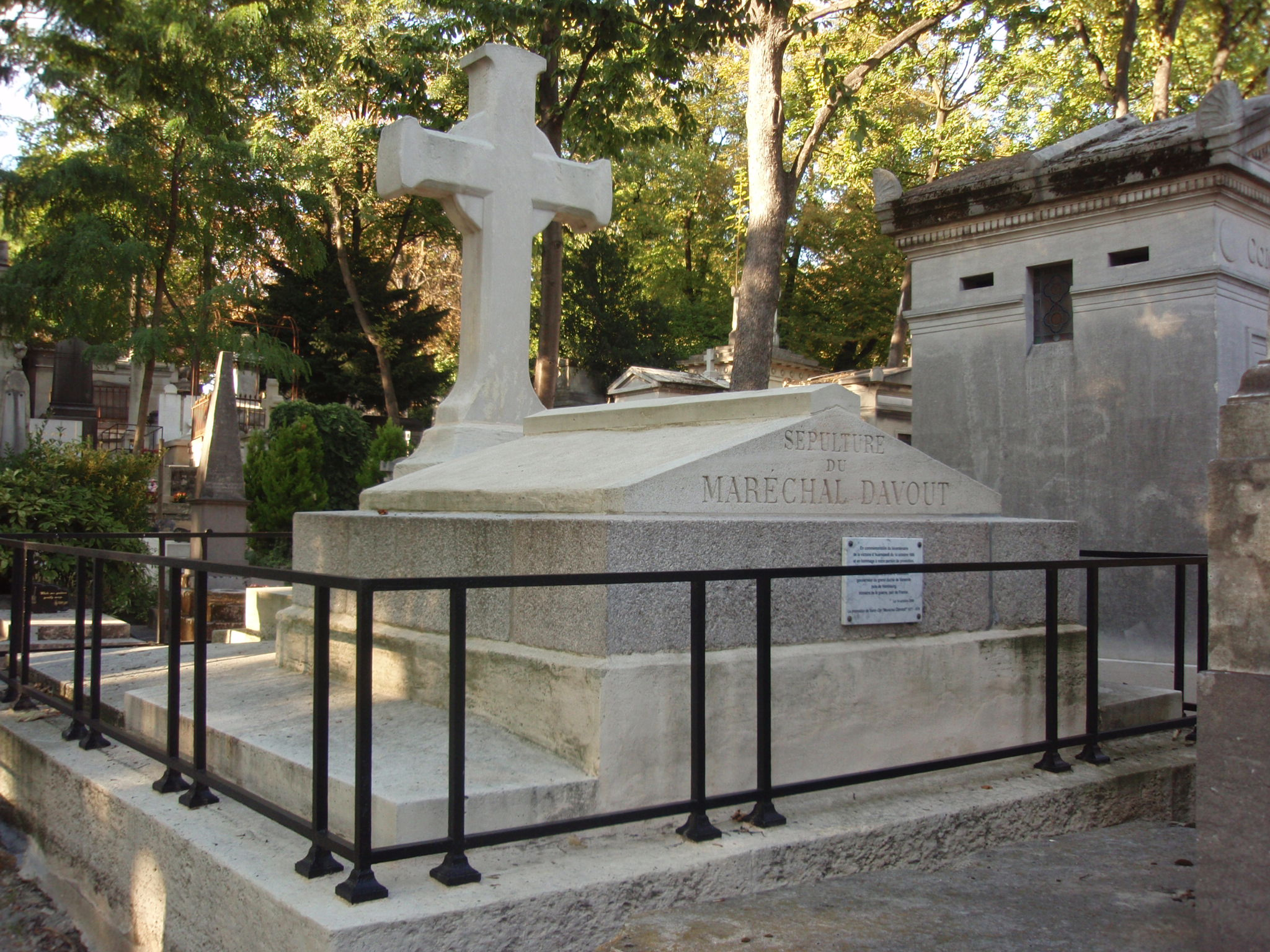
Davout family grave at Père-Lachaise Cemetery

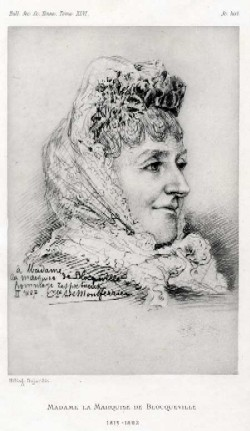
The marquise in 1882. during the performance of Édouard Pailleron's comedy Le Monde où l'on s'ennuie at the Théâtre-Français in 1881. All Paris was astonished at the Marquise's similarity with the actress Madeleine Brohan, who played the role of an old duchess with spiritual distributions.

Adélaïde-Louise d'Eckmühl de Blocqueville (8 July 1815 – 6 October 1892) was a French woman of letters and a poet. She was the youngest daughter of Louis Nicolas Davout and devoted a significant part of her life to honouring the memory of the "glorious marshal" of Napoléon.

== Life ==
Born in Paris, in 1835 Davout married a Maréchal de camp, Edmond François de Coulibœuf, marquis de Blocqueville, who was twenty-six years older than her. She shone at the court of King Louis Philippe and developed a close and affectionate friendship with Queen Maria-Amalia. In 1859, she published her first novel, Perdita. After becoming a widow in 1861, she hosted a salon at her Parisian hotel where many prominent figures from the political, artistic, and literary worlds gathered. Among the notable guests were Dominique Ingres, Adolphe Thiers, Henri Lacordaire, Octave Feuillet, Elme-Marie Caro, Charles Ernest Beulé, Victor Cousin, and Franz Liszt, who composed a musical portrait in her honor in 1869. One of the most frequent visitors to her salon was Jules Claretie, who wrote:

Her salon on Quai Malaquais was one of the last Parisian salons where one could talk not only about small events of the day but also about high literary questions, without the shadow of pedantry or primer. ... Davout's daughter lived there, on the first floor, in an apartment furnished with exquisite taste, the living room, full of memories of the Empire, overlooking a boudoir stretched with preciously embroidered Chinese silks. ... This salon of Mrs. de Blocqueville had its particular physiognomy, with the bronze statue of Davout, who, with his hand on her marshal's staff, seemed to preside over the meetings of the marquise.

In 1874, the marquise published Les Soirées de la villa des Jasmins, where she portrayed four friends "who talked about the soul and its destinies, the unfathomable mysteries of the human heart and discussed a thousand different questions of philosophy, literature and art"; we find there, wrote the critic of the Journal des Savants, "in the midst of many longueurs, many generous ideas, noble impulses, fine observations, right and elevated thoughts".

From 1879 onwards, she published several volumes dedicated to her father's memory as well as several collections of poetry. At the Academie des jeux floraux, which conferred on her the title of "Master of Games" in 1878, she established the Eckmühl Prize in 1880, a biennial competition that rewards the best essay on a subject of Christian philosophy with a golden jasmine. She then founded a museum, the Salle d'Eckmühl in Auxerre, to which she donated many family souvenirs. In 1885, she bequeathed by will the sum of 300,000 francs for the construction of the famous phare d'Eckmühl at Penmarc'h.

After she died in Villers-sur-Mer, she was buried at the Père Lachaise Cemetery (28th division).

== Works ==
- Perdita (1859) Read on line on Gallica
- Chrétienne et musulman (1861). Reissued in 1892 under the title Stella et Mohammed, ou Chrétienne et musulman. Read on line (Gallica)
- Le Prisme de l'âme, étude (1863)
- Rome (1865) Text on line on Gallica
- Les Soirées de la villa des Jasmins (4 volumes, 1874)
- Le Maréchal Davout, prince d'Eckmühl, raconté par les siens et par lui-même (4 volumes, 1879-1880)
- Roses de Noël. Pensées d'hiver (1884)
- Pensées d'un pape (Clement XIV), publiées par la Mise de Blocqueville (1885)
- A.-L. d'Eckmühl, Mise de Blocqueville. Le maréchal Davout, prince d'Eckmühl. Correspondance inédite, 1790-1815. Pologne, Russie, Hambourg (1887) Read on line on Gallica
- Chrysanthèmes, pensées d'automne (1888)
- À travers l'Invisible (1891)
- Pensées et souvenirs (1894)
- Un prêté rendu, proverbe (s.d.)
