= Point Penmarc'h =

Peninsula in Brittany, France

Coordinates: 47°48′N 4°22′W

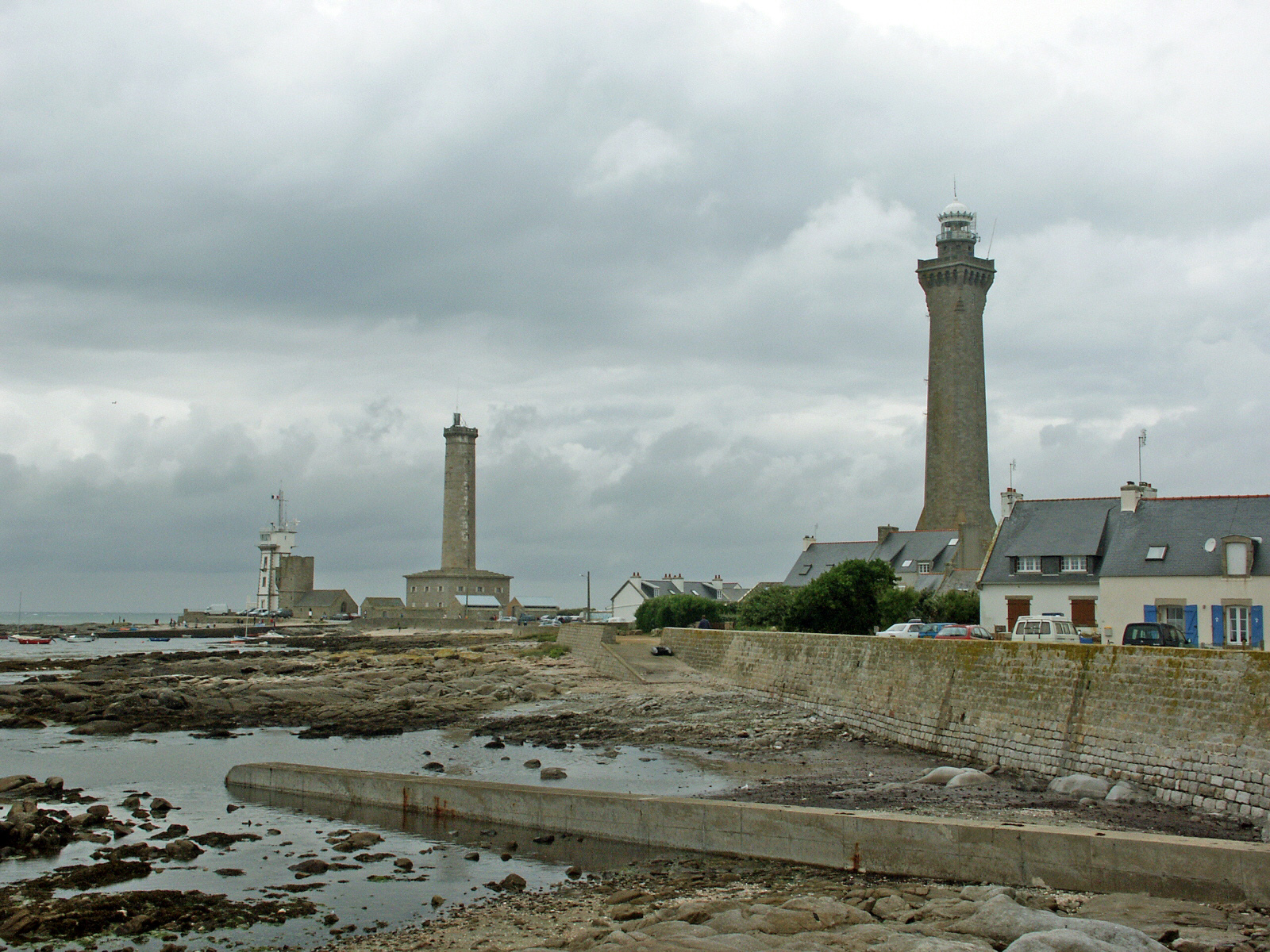
Phare d'Eckmuhl, at the end of Point Penmarc'h

Point Penmarc'h, often spelled Point Penmarch, or in French Pointe de Penmarc'h, is the extremity of a small peninsula in Finistère department in Brittany in northwestern France, and the northern limit of the Bay of Biscay.

It contains the fortified remains of a town which was of considerable importance from the 14th to the 16th centuries, and included today's commune of Penmarc'h, which covers the harbours of Saint-Guénolé and Kerity. The town owed its prosperity to its cod-banks, the disappearance of which together with the discovery of the Newfoundland cod-banks and the pillage of the place by the bandit La Fontenelle in 1595 contributed to its decline.

The Phare d'Eckmühl, a lighthouse with a light visible for 60 nautical miles (111 km; 69 mi), stands on the point.

== See also ==
- Penmarc'h
