= Duc d'Auerstaedt =

The title of Duc d'Auerstaedt (sometimes written Auerstädt) was created by Napoleon I, Emperor of the French, for the Marshal of France Louis Nicolas Davout in 1808 as a victory title rewarding and commemorating Davout's splendid victory at the Battle of Auerstaedt in 1806.

The title became extinct in 1853 but was then given to the descendants of one of Marshal Davout's brothers, Charles Isidore d'Avout, by an imperial edict of Napoleon III.

== Ducs d'Auerstaedt (1808) ==
- Louis-Nicolas Davout, Marshal of France, Prince d'Eckmühl, Peer of France (10 May 1770-1 Jun 1823)
- Napoléon Louis Davout d'Auerstaedt d'Eckmühl, (6 January 1811 – 13 June 1853), son of Marshal Davout
- General Léopold Davout d'Auerstaedt (9 August 1829 – 1904), restored to the extinct title in 1864
- Louis Nicolas Marie Bernard Davout d'Auerstaedt (24 March 1877 – 1 March 1958)
- Colonel Léopold Henri Jean Louis Marie Davout d'Auerstaedt (12 February 1904 – 18 May 1985)
- Charles Louis Iwao Marie Davout d'Auerstaedt (30 November 1951 – 8 February 2006)
- Sébastien Davout d'Auerstaedt (1992–present)
