= Brémontier-Merval =

- Commune
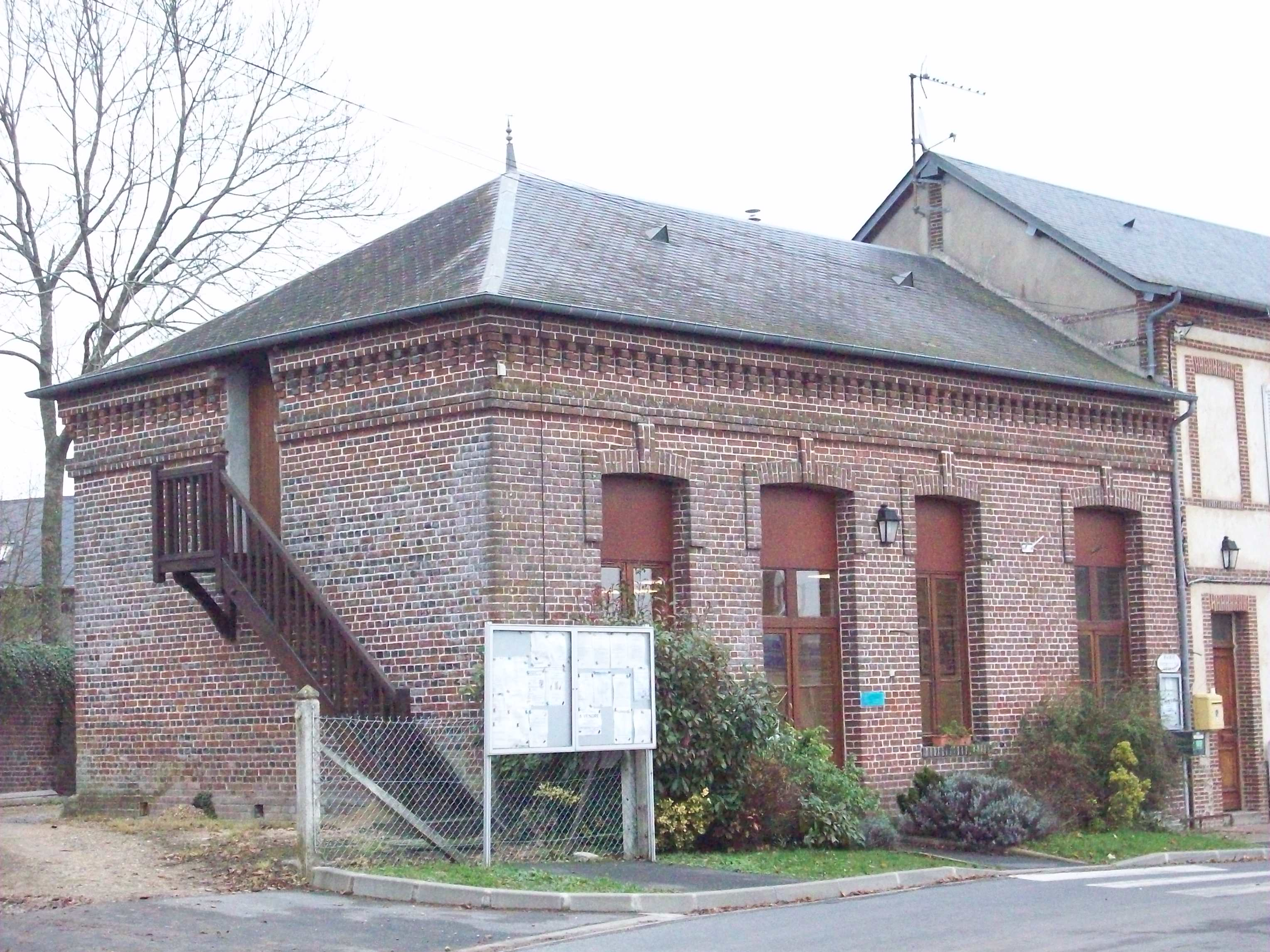
- The town hall in Brémontier-Merval
- Location of Brémontier-Merval
- Location within France Location within Normandy
- Coordinates: 49°30′20″N 1°36′40″E
- Country: France
- Region: Normandy
- Department: Seine-Maritime
- Arrondissement: Dieppe
- Canton: Gournay-en-Bray
- Intercommunality: CC 4 rivières

Government
  - Mayor (2026–32): Jean-Luc Cosquer
- Area^{1}: 17.17 km^{2} (6.63 sq mi)
- Elevation: 181 m (594 ft)
- Highest elevation: 210 m (690 ft)
- Lowest elevation: 103 m (338 ft)
- Population (2023): 425
  - Density: 24.8/km^{2} (64.1/sq mi)
- Time zone: UTC+01:00 (CET)
  - Summer (DST): UTC+02:00 (CEST)
- INSEE/Postal code: 76142 /76220
- ^{1} French Land Register data, which excludes lakes, ponds, glaciers > 1 km^{2} (0.386 sq mi or 247 acres) and river estuaries.

Brémontier-Merval (French pronunciation: [bʁemɔ̃tje mɛʁval]) is a commune in the Seine-Maritime department in the Normandy region in northern France.

== Geography ==
A farming village situated in the Pays de Bray, 26 miles (42 km) east of Rouen, at the junction of the D84, D284, D21 and D145 roads.

== Population ==
Historical population
Year	Pop.	±% p.a.
1968	367	—
1975	311	−2.34%
1982	265	−2.26%
1990	278	+0.60%
1999	326	+1.79%
2007	481	+4.98%
2012	480	−0.04%
2017	459	−0.89%
2023	425	−1.27%
Source: INSEE

== Places of interest ==
- The church of St.Martin, dating from the sixteenth century.
- The seventeenth-century château de Brémontier-Merval.
- The château de Bellozanne, built in 1827 on the old abbey site.
- The thirteenth-century chapel of St.Léonard at Merval.
- The eighteenth-century chapel of St.Marguerite at Bellozanne.
- Les écuries de Bellozanne.

== See also ==
- Communes of the Seine-Maritime department
