= Annoux =

- Commune
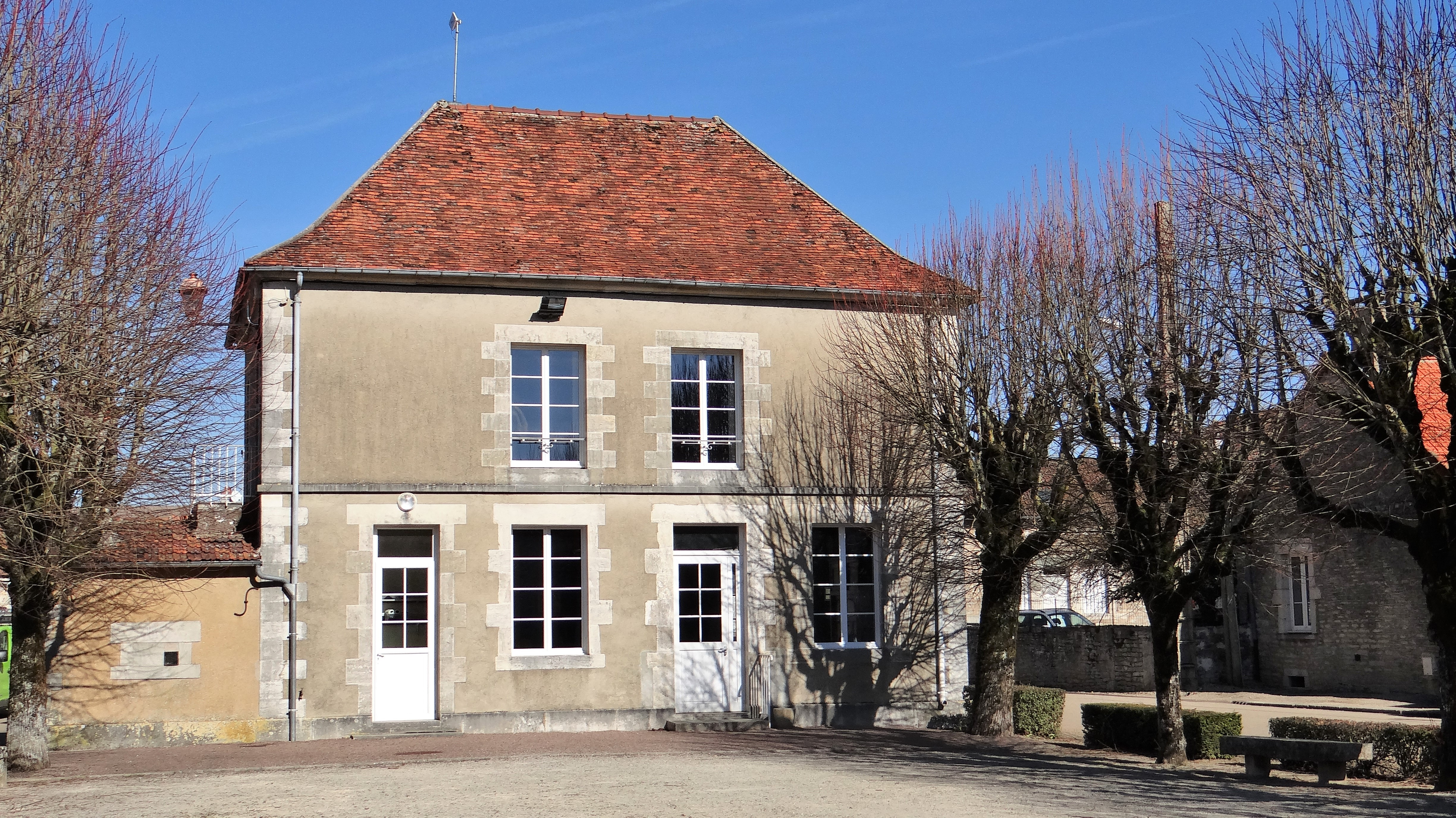
- The town hall in Annoux
- Location of Annoux
- Location within France Location within Bourgogne-Franche-Comté
- Coordinates: 47°37′38″N 4°03′05″E
- Country: France
- Region: Bourgogne-Franche-Comté
- Department: Yonne
- Arrondissement: Avallon
- Canton: Chablis

Government
  - Mayor (2020–2026): Bruno Charmet
- Area^{1}: 8.97 km^{2} (3.46 sq mi)
- Highest elevation: 332 m (1,089 ft)
- Lowest elevation: 250 m (820 ft)
- Population (2023): 85
  - Density: 9.5/km^{2} (25/sq mi)
- Time zone: UTC+01:00 (CET)
  - Summer (DST): UTC+02:00 (CEST)
- INSEE/Postal code: 89012 /89440
- ^{1} French Land Register data, which excludes lakes, ponds, glaciers > 1 km^{2} (0.386 sq mi or 247 acres) and river estuaries.

Annoux (French pronunciation: [anu]) is a commune in the Yonne department in Bourgogne-Franche-Comté in north-central France.

== See also ==
- Communes of the Yonne department
