= Lannes (surname) =

Lannes is a surname. Notable people with the surname include:

- Carlos Lannes (born 1979), Argentine cross-country skier
- Georges Lannes (1895–1983), French film actor
- Gustave Olivier Lannes de Montebello (1804–1875), French general and politician, son of Jean Lannes
- Gustave Lannes de Montebello, French diplomat, grandson of Jean Lannes, ambassador of France to Russia (1891–1902)
- Henriette H. Lannes (1899–1980), central historical figure in the Gurdjieff Foundation
- Jean Lannes (1769–1809), duke of Montebello, Prince of Siewierz, Marshal of France
- Jean Lannes (mathematician) (born 1947), French mathematician
- Louis Napoléon Lannes (1801–1874), French diplomat and politician, son of Jean Lannes
- Louise Antoinette Lannes, Duchess of Montebello (1782–1856), French courtier, second wife of Jean Lannes
- Roberta Lannes (born 1948), American writer
