= Pierre Charles Pouzet =

French general

Pierre Charles Pouzet, baron de Saint-Charles (French pronunciation: [pjɛʁ ʃaʁl puzɛ]; b. 11 July 1766 – d. 22 May 1809) was a French general who was killed at the battle of Aspern-Essling.

Born in Poitiers, Pouzet entered the French army as a volunteer in 1782 and by 1791 had been promoted to sergeant-major. In 1793 he was promoted to lieutenant and to captain. As a lieutenant Pouzet served as drill instructor and mentor to the young Jean Lannes, with whom he forged a lifelong friendship. He served with the Army of the Eastern Pyrenees in the campaigns against Spain (1793-1794) and became a battalion commander by 1795. He then transferred to the Army of Italy, with which he fought in the Italian campaigns.

In September 1800 he was given command of a battalion of the Consular Guard. In 1803 he became colonel of the 10th Infantry regiment, which he led in the campaigns of 1805 and 1806-1807, fighting at Austerlitz, Jena and Eylau. In February 1807 Pouzet was promoted to general de brigade and in 1808 he led a brigade in the division of Sebastiani in Spain. He temporarily served as chief of staff to his old friend Marshal Lannes and fought at Tudela before returning to his brigade command. In October 1808 he was ennobled as a baron.

On the outbreak of the War of the Fifth Coalition, Pouzet commanded a brigade in the division of Saint-Hilaire, with which he served at Landshut, Eckmühl and Essling. On the second day of Essling, while conversing with his old friend Lannes, Pouzet was decapitated by a cannonball. Lannes was mortally wounded by another cannonball minutes later.
