= Louise Antoinette Lannes =

French courtier

Louise Antoinette Lannes Duchess of Montebello
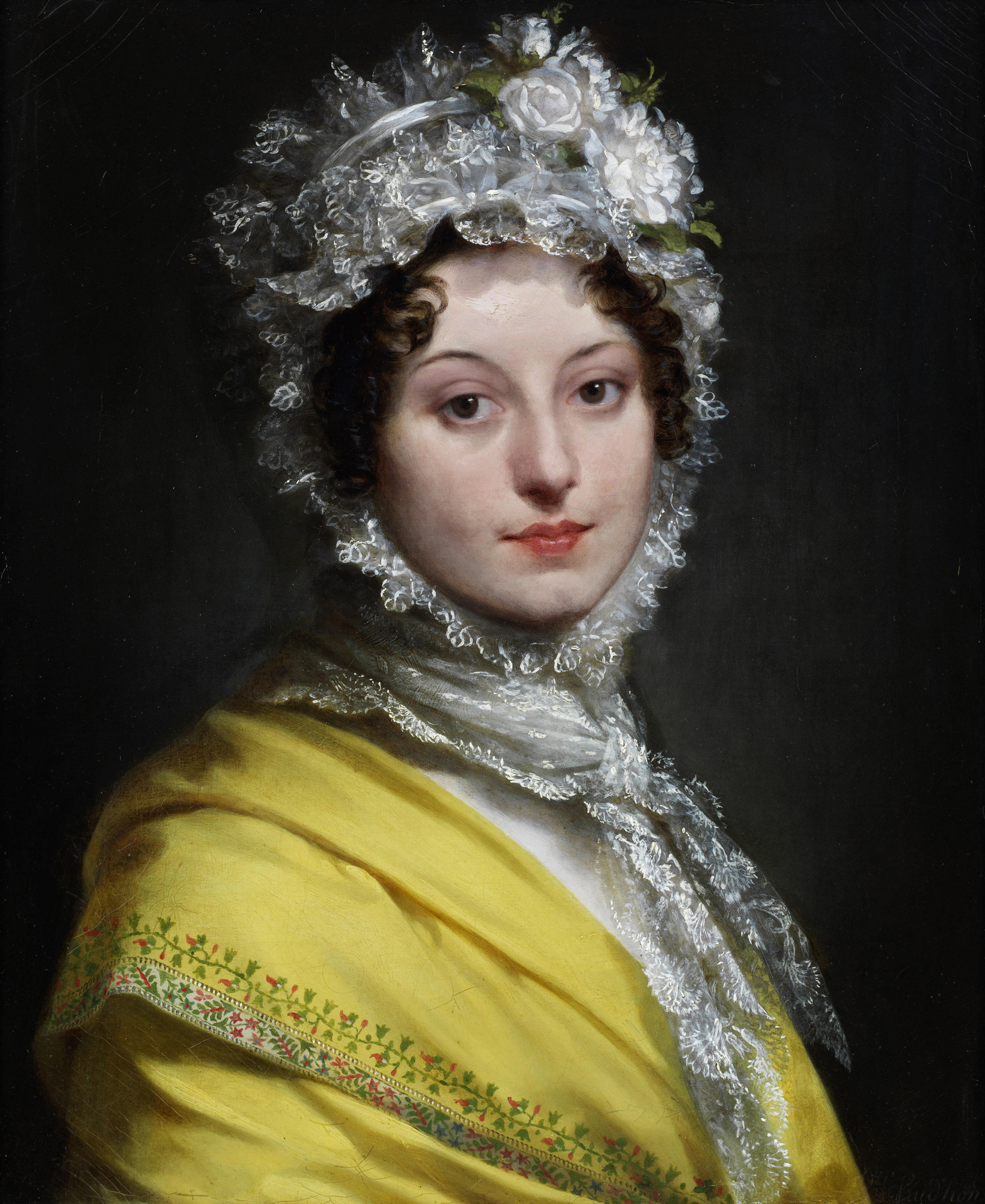
- Born: 26 February 1782; Paris, Kingdom of France
- Died: 3 July 1856 (aged 74); Paris, French Empire
- Occupation: Première dame d'honneur to Marie Louise, Duchess of Parma
- Spouse: Jean Lannes (m. 1800; died 1809)
- Children: 5, including Louis Napoléon and Gustave Olivier
- Father: François Scholastique, Count of Guéhéneuc

Louise Antoinette Lannes, Duchess of Montebello (26 February 1782 – 3 July 1856) was a French courtier, dame d'honneur (Mistress of the Robes) to Empress Marie Louise of France, and the second wife of Jean Lannes, one of the best military commanders in history and Napoléon's ablest Marshal, who was nicknamed the Achilles of the Grand Armée. She was the daughter of senator and financier François Scholastique, Count of Guéhéneuc. She was the sister of general Charles Louis Joseph Olivier, Count of Guéhéneuc.

== Life ==
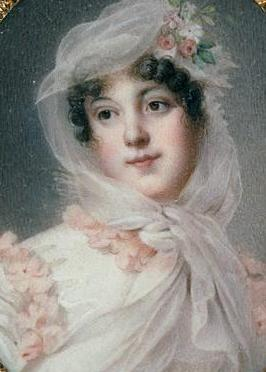
Miniature by Jean-Baptiste Isabey (1767–1855), circa 1802 .

On 16 September 1800, at the age of 18, she married general Jean Lannes (1769–1809) at Dornes, becoming his second spouse. According to Madame Junot, Madame Lannes's fine features resembled Raphael's or Corregio's most exquisite Madonnas. Louise had a very happy married life with Lannes even though it was an arranged-marriage. The couple had five children in quick succession: four sons (Napoléon, Alfred, Ernest and Gustave) born in 1801, 1802, 1803, and 1804, and one daughter (Joséphine) in 1806. Following Lannes's death, their eldest son Napoléon succeeded in his father's titles. Their three other sons used the courtesy title of baron.

I hope, my dear Louise, that this will be the last battle and that we will have peace. I don't need to say how much I want to be closer to you and our young children. I am very tired, etc.

— Lannes, after the Battle of Friedland, 17 June, 1807

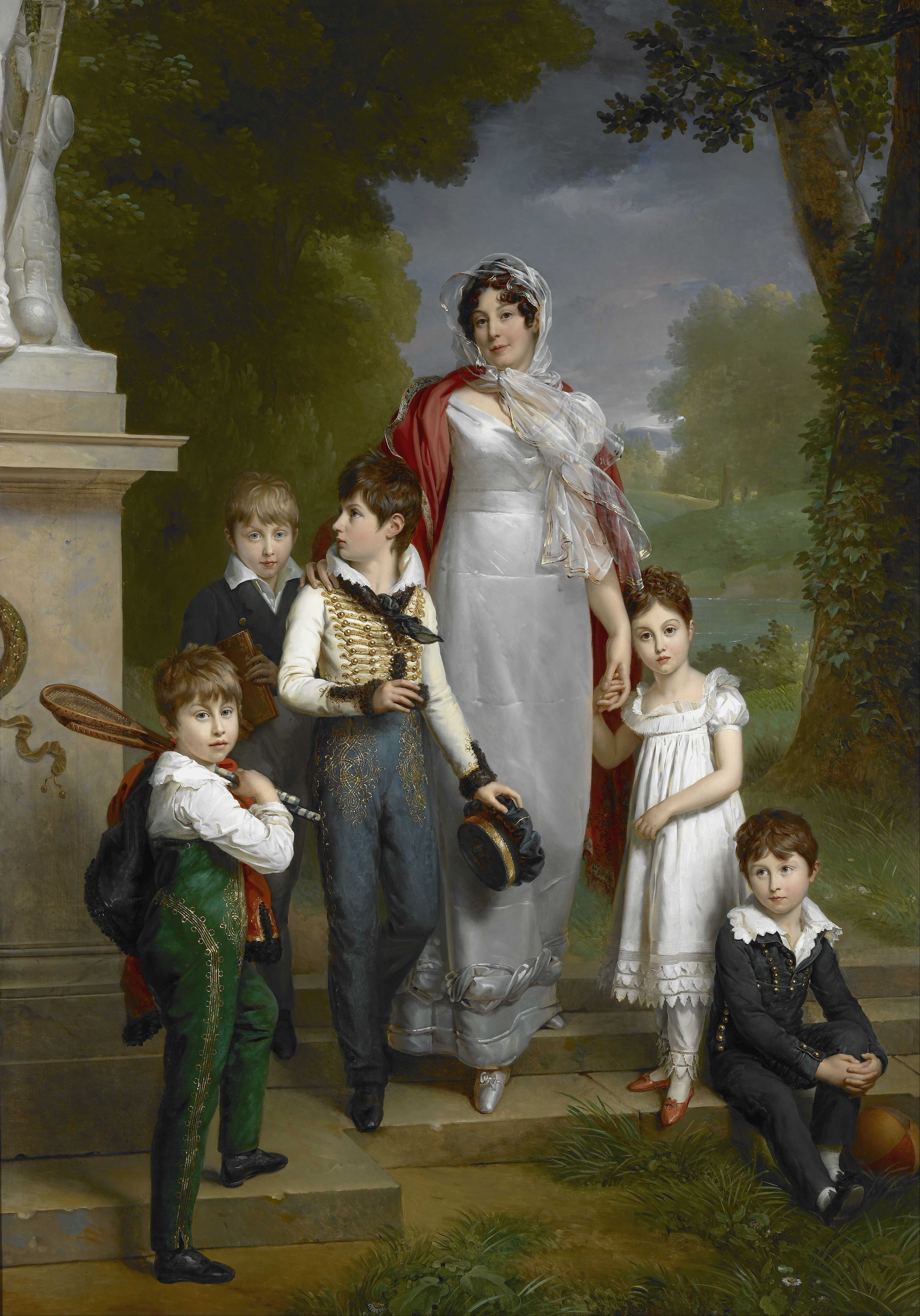
François Gérard – Portrait of Madame la Maréchale Lannes, Duchesse de Montebello with Her Children

She accompanied her husband who was sent as ambassador to Portugal in 1801. On any state occasion, Madame Lannes outshone Lady Fitzgerald (wife of the British ambassador) because she was elegant, clever, lovely, and exercised tact and discretion at all times. Attending the opening night of the opera in Lisbon as the honored guests of the prince regent, the French ambassador and his wife completely eclipsed their British counterparts. The Portuguese nobility dearly loved a show of beauty, grace, and conspicuous consumption, and Lannes was not above putting his best foot forward—not his own in this case but his wife's. In 1807, Jean Larrey sent for Louise when Lannes was recovering from typhus in Poland.

The Duchess of Montebello enjoyed a great deal of respect in the contemporary Parisian high society as a role model of aristocratic femininity. She was appointed dame d'honneur (Mistress of the Robes) to Empress Marie Louise by Napoleon I, a position she kept from 1810 until the fall of Napoleon in 1814.

Montebello was described as a virtuous beauty with domestic values and Napoleon reportedly trusted and respected her and referred to her as a "true lady of honor". She, however, did in fact not like him, reportedly because she blamed him for the death of her spouse. Her relationship to Marie Louise was very good, and she became a favorite of the empress.

=== Duchess of Montebello ===
Louise gained the title Duchess of Montebello after Napoléon awarded the title Duke of Montebello to her husband in 1808. Her husband usually referred to her as "a dear friend" in his letters to her.

I am very tired, my dear friend, you really have to be iron to resist it, write to me often, my dear friend, kiss our children, and the whole family. I don't need to tell you how much I love you, it's[s]t of heart and soul...

— Lannes, signed autograph letter to his wife, 29 April, 1809

She was widowed a few weeks later, when her husband died on 31 May 1809 from the wounds he suffered during the Battle of Aspern-Essling.

=== Court service ===
After her arrival to France, Marie Louise was allowed to keep only one person of her Austrian entourage, her former governess countess Lazansky, who was her trusted confidante. Montebello, however, complained to Napoleon that she would not be able to act as a guide of the empress as long as she was allowed to keep her Austrian favorite, and Lazansky was therefore sent back to Vienna with Marie Louise's dog the same year. This was reportedly a traumatic event for Marie Louise, who had attached herself to Lazansky ever since her first governess, countess Colloredo, who had been as a mother for her, had left her position during her childhood.

Lazansky was replaced by Montebello as the personal friend, confidante and favorite of the empress. Empress Marie Louise had a large French household appointed to her by Napoleon, the ladies-in-waiting including, except for Montebello, of Jeanne Charlotte du Luçay was dame d'atours and up to thirty eight dames du palais, including the Duchesse de Bassano, Comtesses de Montmorency, Mortemart, de Bouille, Elisabeth Baude de Talhouët, Lauriston, Marie Antoinette Duchâtel, Montalivert, Peron, Lascaris, Noailles, Ventimiglia, Brignole, Gentili, and Canisy, and besides these, a group of dame d'annonce, who had the task of announcing her visitors. However, in practice, the ladies-in-waiting normally only attended her in festive occasions and attended her as entourage when she left the palace, and only Montebello was present to accompany her during her everyday life. Montebello often spent the night in her apartment close to the empress, and Marie Louise, who lived very isolated and seldom left her rooms except for attending official occasions scheduled by Napoleon, used to visit her through a back passage, which allowed her to go directly to the room of Montebello without passing through the salon were her ladies-in-waiting spent their hours when they were in service, and the empress' way of favoring Montebello before all other courtiers caused offence and did not make her popular at court.

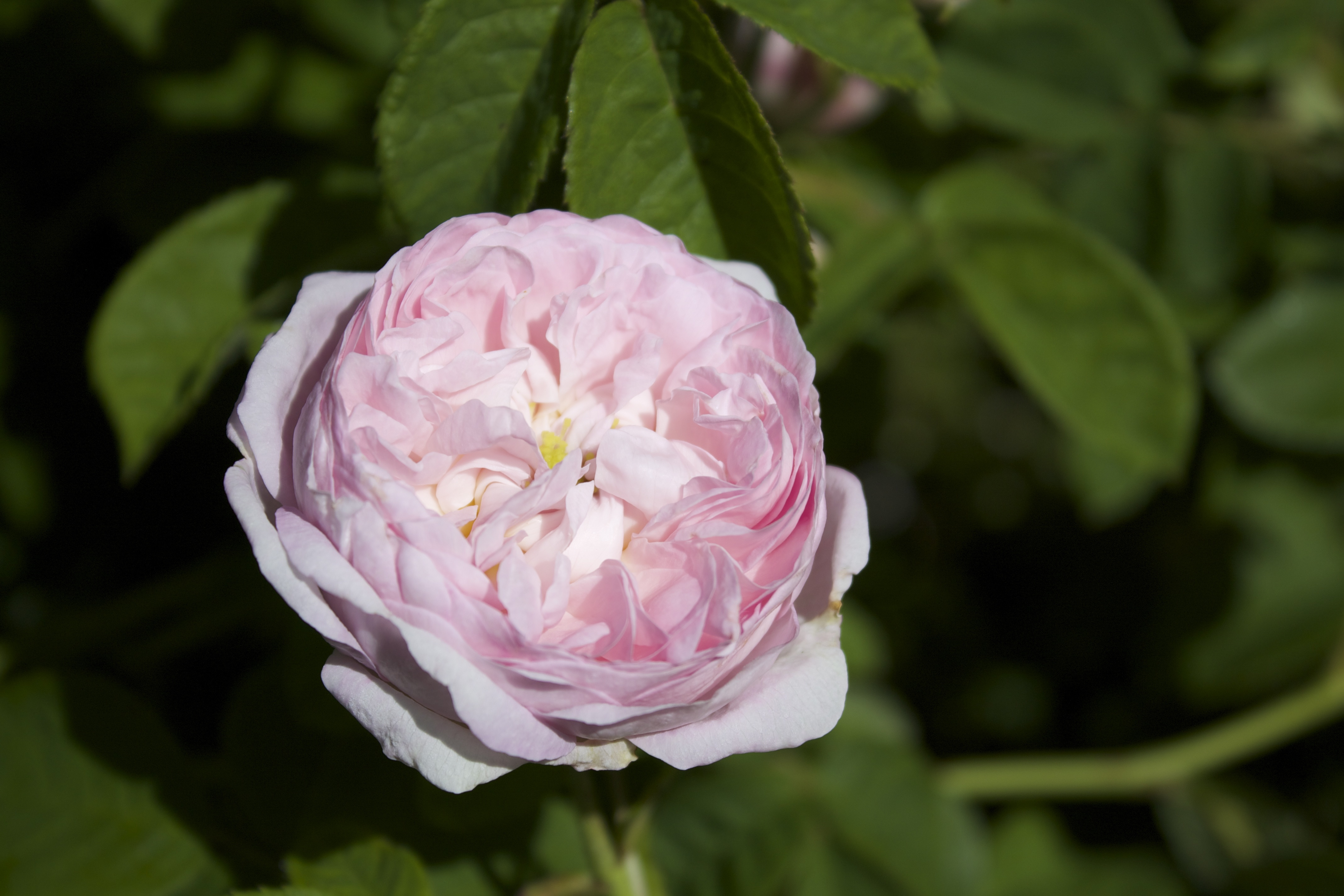
Rosa 'Duchesse de Montebello' (Laffay 1824) (14464469891)

During the tenure of Marie Louise as empress, the court was divided into three parties: the party of the new career aristocracy, who had been ennobled by Napoleon, was led by the duchess of Montebello and had the support of the emperor; the party of the old nobility of the ancien regime, was led by the governess of Napoleon II, Louise Charlotte Françoise de Montesquiou, who had Napoleon's respect; and the military party, led by Géraud Duroc.

Montebello was a great support for Marie Louise during her childbirth, when she slept in her bedroom to support her. She stood by Marie Louise's side during her first regency in 1813, and accompanied her on her trip to Normandy with de Lucay. During Marie Louise's second regency in 1814, she accompanied the empress when she fled Paris in March to Blois in the entourage of Dr. Corvisart and her ladies-in-waiting de Lugay, de Castiglione and Moritalivet. When Marie Louise was encouraged to return to Paris before the Bourbons did to secure the throne for her son after the abdication of Napoleon, she was reportedly willing to do so after a conversation with her dame d'annonce Mme Durand, but changed her mind and decided to stay on the advice of Montebello and Corvisart. Montebello also convinced Marie Louise to accept the suggestion to go to Austria rather than to join Napoleon on his exile in Elba.

Montebello joined Marie Louise on her trip to Austria after the fall of Napoleon. However, she was soon replaced as the head of Marie Louise's court by the Contessa de Brignole, despite the protest of Marie Louise; partially because Austria wished to have all her French courtiers replaced, and partially because she herself did not wish to continue her service in exile and wanted to be near her children. She never remarried.

== Legacy ==
Jean Laffay named a breed of rose as Duchesse de Montebello in honor of Madame Lannes in 1824.

== See also ==
- Adélaïde de La Rochefoucauld

Court offices
Preceded by Adélaïde de La Rochefoucauld	Première dame d'honneur 1810–1814	Succeeded by Christine-Zoë de Montjoye
