= Lannes =

Lannes can refer to:

- Lannes (surname)
- Lannes, Lot-et-Garonne, a commune in the Lot-et-Garonne département, in France
- Lannes (province), a former province of France

== See also ==
- Lanne (disambiguation)
