= Jean-Charles Nicaise Perrin =

French painter (1754–1831)

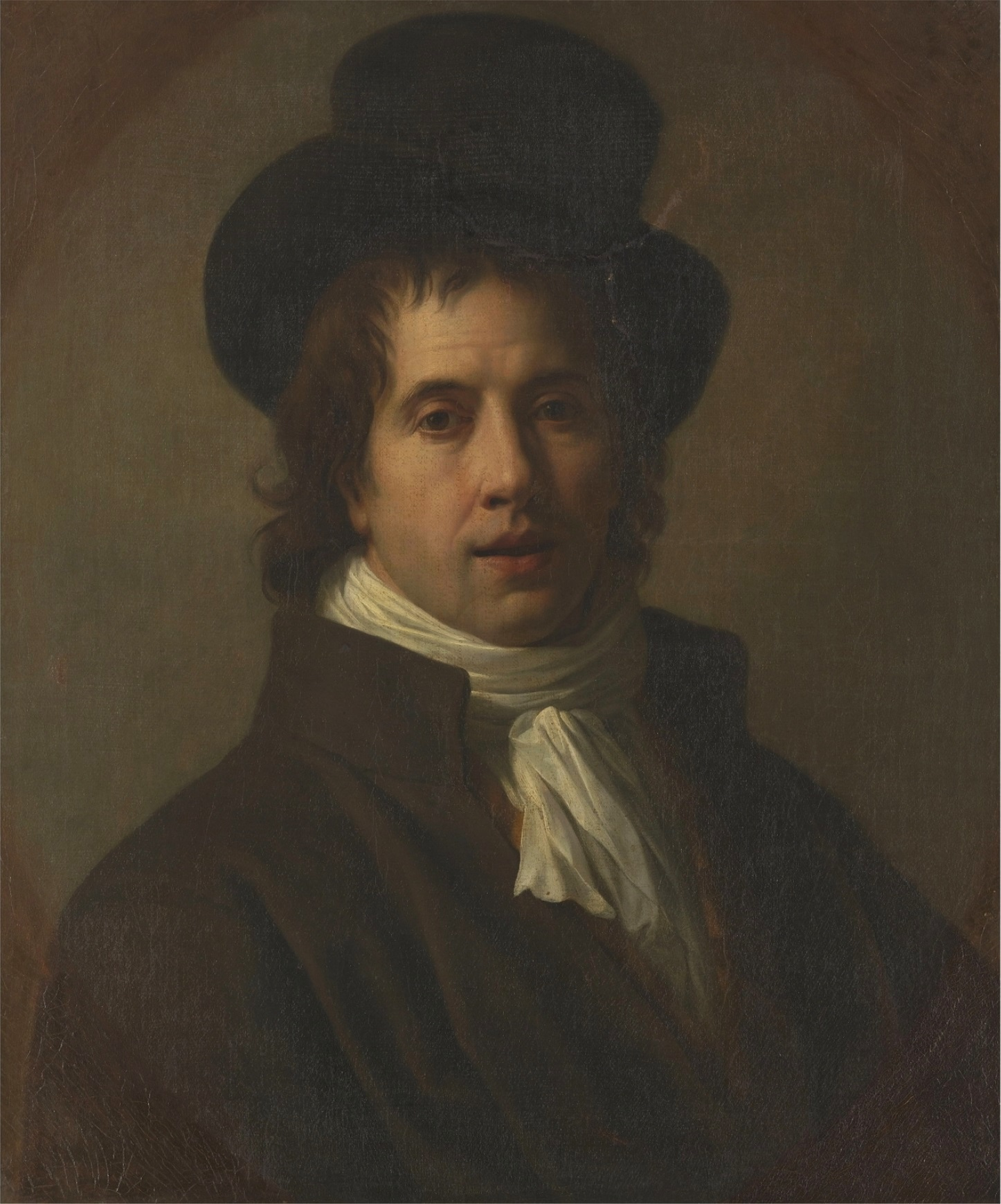
Self-portrait (before 1800)

Jean-Charles Nicaise Perrin (12 October 1754, in Paris – 23 September 1831, in Paris) was a French Neo-Classical painter, primarily of historical and Biblical scenes. During the Empire, he produced patriotic allegories.

== Biography ==
At the age of eighteen, he obtained positions in the workshops of Gabriel-François Doyen and Louis Jean-Jacques Durameau. He made several attempts to win the Prix de Rome, without success, although he managed to take second place three times. On the third occasion, however, in 1780, he was granted the bursary because the first place winner, Jean-Pierre Saint-Ours, turned out to be a Swiss citizen and was ruled ineligible to go.

He was in Rome from 1780 to 1784 and was attracted to the works of Guercino and, especially, Caravaggio; making a meticulous copy of "The Entombment of Christ", which is now at the École Nationale Supérieure des Beaux-Arts. In 1783, he was commissioned to paint the death of Sophonisba for Cardinal Bernis.

After returning to Paris, he was admitted into the Académie royale de Peinture et de Sculpture in 1787 for his portrayal of Aeneas being healed, which resulted in a rush of commissions. In 1788, he produced a canvas on the death of Seneca ordered by the Comte d'Angiviller on behalf of King Louis XVI.

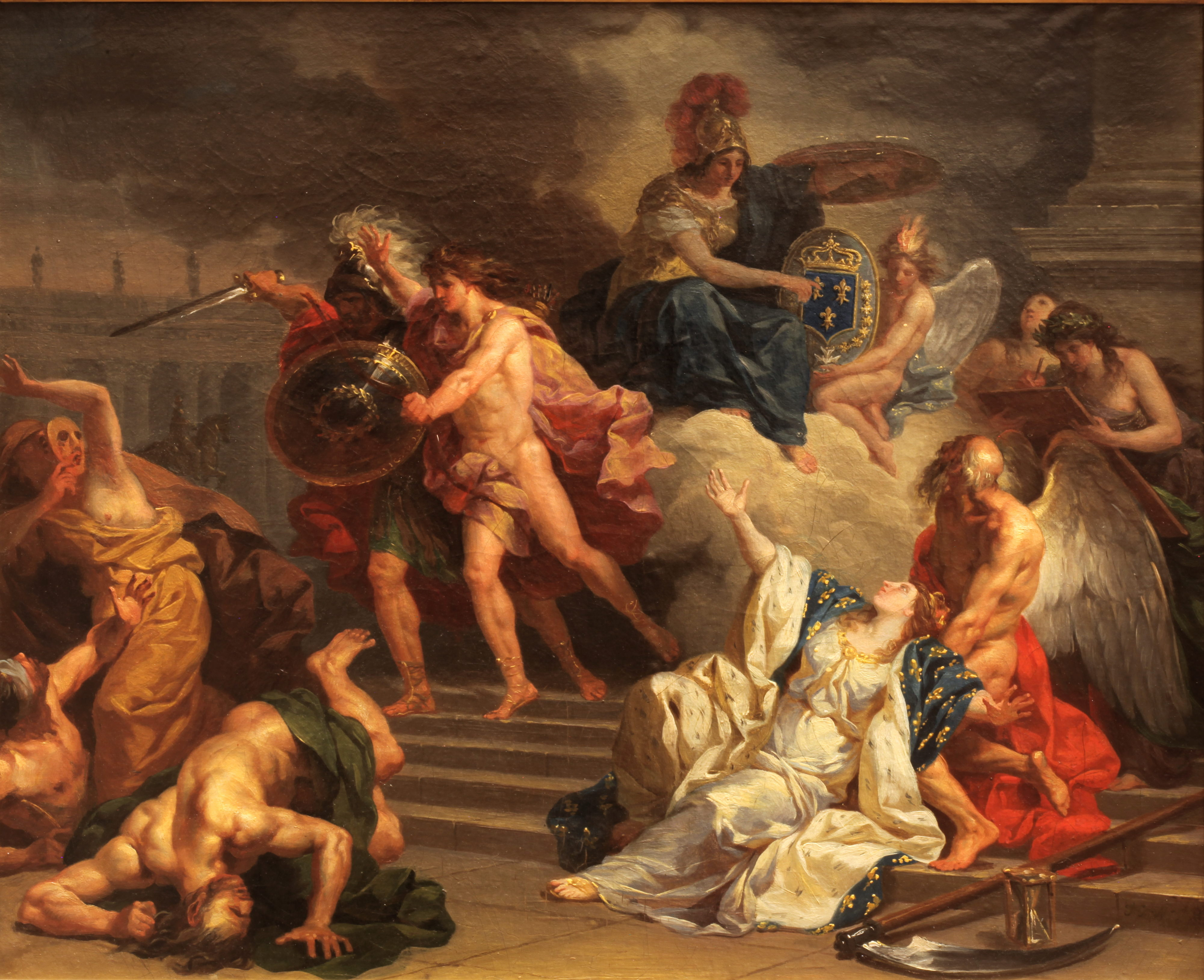
France Comforted by Time (date unknown)

In 1804, Napoleon's agents commissioned a portrait of Marshal Jean Lannes for the "Hall of the Marshals" at the Tuileries Palace. That same year, he painted the Assumption of Mary for the high altar at Montpellier Cathedral. In 1806, he created "France, Supported by Religion, Consecrating Flags Taken from the Enemy to Notre-Dame-de-Gloire", a patriotic mural for the Emperor's personal chapel at the Tuileries. He exhibited regularly at the Salon until 1822.
