= Louis Napoléon Lannes =

French diplomat and politician

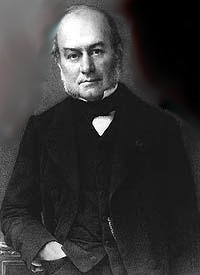
Louis Napoléon Lannes

Louis Napoléon Auguste Lannes, 2nd duc de Montebello (30 July 1801 – 18 July 1874) was a French diplomat and politician.

== Life and career ==
Born in Paris, he was the son of Jean Lannes, 1st duc de Montebello, Marshal of the Empire, who died from wounds received during the Battle of Essling on 22 May 1809, and his second wife, Antoinette Scholastica Guéhenneuc. He was made a peer of France on 27 January 1827 by Charles X in consideration of services rendered by his father; however, he took his seat at the Palais du Luxembourg (meeting place of the Chamber of Peers) after the Revolution of 1830. In the meantime, he had traveled to the United States, then was attached to the Embassy of France in Rome, with the Vicomte de Chateaubriand.

Lannes at first appeared, by his votes, to be linked to the Legitimist faction (which supported the claims to the French throne of the elder line of the House of Bourbon), but he was soon to join fully in support of the July Monarchy and usually then voted with the Doctrinaires. He spoke in many discussions about press freedom, the hereditary peerage (1831), imprisonment for debt, budget and progress in the army (1832).

Back in diplomacy, Lannes was sent on a mission to Denmark at the Court of Copenhagen (1833), then to Sweden ans shortly after as Minister Plenipotentiary at Berlin. In the Chamber of Peers, he supported the Cousin amendment law repealing the day of mourning in honor of Louis XVI on 21 January. He supported the platform of Partisan laws of September 1835, and proposed to his colleagues to bring them to the manager of the newspaper La Tribune.

In 1836, the Duke was appointed as ambassador of France to the Swiss Confederation in place of the Marquis de Rumigny, who was considered too favorable to Swiss liberals. He had conflicting sympathies, his appointment being intended to please Austria, with which France was seeking to get closer both to break its isolation in Europe, and to ensure the marital prospects of Prince Ferdinand Philippe, Duke of Orléans, the heir to the throne. He obtained, from the confederal authorities, the internment of political refugees who might disturb the security of neighboring states, and the expulsion of Prince Louis Napoleon (who lived in Swiss territory at the castle of Arenenberg), but how this application was submitted nearly led to war between the two countries.

He was then appointed to represent France in Naples, at the court of the King of the Two Sicilies, Ferdinand II (1838).

The Duke of Montebello was recalled from Naples on 1 April 1839, replacing Louis-Mathieu Molé as foreign minister in an interim ministry, which was dissolved the following 12 May. He then handed the foreign ministry portfolio to Marshal Soult, Duke of Dalmatia, and returned to the Chamber of Peers where he spoke on literary property, on the Legion of Honour, on the Greek loan, and on child labor in factories.

He returned to Naples as ambassador in 1840, where he negotiated the marriage of the Duke of Aumale with Marie Caroline de Bourbon, Princess of Salerno (1844).

On 9 May 1847, the Duke of Montebello replaced Admiral baron de Mackau as Minister of Marine and Colonies in the Guizot ministry. He presented, as such a report to the king in which he pronounced against the emancipation of slaves, and several bills relating to the court of assizes in the colonies, the body administering the control and accounts of the Navy and participated in discussions on the budget, land clearing, on the teaching and practice of medicine and pharmacy.

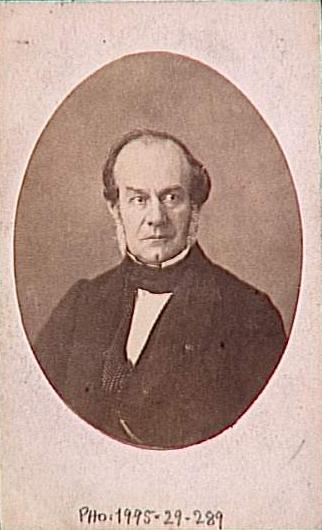
Photographic portrait of Duke of Montebello (Duc de Montebello), ambassador and senator, by Gustave Le Gray

The Duke of Montebello left government following the Revolution of 1848. However, soon after, as part of a coalition of "old parties", the duke was elected, on 13 May 1849, to the Second Republic's Legislative Assembly. The duke represented the department of Marne, where he owned large vineyards. Lannes was part of the commission which called for an extension and confined himself to vote consistently with the majority: for the Roman expedition, for the law-Falloux Parieu on free education, and for the restriction of universal suffrage.

He did not immediately support the coup d'état of 2 December 1851. But he changed his mind and, on 15 February 1858, he was appointed ambassador to Russia instead of Count Rayneval. In this position, where he remained until 1864, he had to negotiate, among other things, the agreement of 6 April 1861, for the reciprocal guarantee works of art and spirit.

By decree of Emperor Napoleon III, on 5 October 1864, he was appointed a Senator. He retired as ambassador on 6 January 1866. He had long represented the canton of Ay in the General Council of the Marne, which was one of the vice-presidents.

He died at Chateau de Mareuil-sur-Ay in Marne in 1874, aged 72.

== Family ==
He married Eleanor Jenkinson in 1830, a daughter of Sir Charles Jenkinson. They had two daughters and six sons. One of his brothers was Gustave de Montebello.

== Decorations ==
- France: Grand Cross of the Legion of Honour (30 October 1844)
- Russia: Order of St. Andrew (conferred by the Emperor of Russia after his stay in Nice in 1864)

== Sources ==
- Larousse encyclopédique en couleurs, France Loisirs, 1978
- « Louis Napoléon Lannes », in Adolphe Robert, Edgar Bourloton et Gaston Cougny, Dictionnaire des parlementaires français (1789–1891), XIXe siècle
- État présent de la noblesse française contenant le dictionnaire de la noblesse contemporaine et l'armorial général de France d'après les manuscrits de Ch. d'Hozier by Antoine Bachelin-Deflorenne, libr. des bibliophiles, 1887 p. 1360

Political offices
Preceded by Ange René Armand, baron de Mackau	Ministers of the Navy and the Colonies; 9 May 1847 – 24 February 1848	Succeeded by François Arago
Preceded by Louis-Mathieu Molé	Minister of Foreign Affairs; 31 March 1839 – 12 May 1839	Succeeded by Nicolas Jean de Dieu Soult, duc de Dalmatie
Regnal titles
Preceded by Jean Lannes	Duc de Montebello; 1809–1874	Succeeded by Napoléon Camille Charles Jean Lannes
