= Veterans Company of the Imperial Guard =

Veterans unit of the French Imperial Army

- Compagnie des Vétérans de la Garde Impériale
- Active: 29 July 1804 – 1 July 1814; 9 years, 11 months
- Country: First French Empire
- Branch: French Imperial Army
- Type: Veterans
- Size: 1 company till 1811; 2 companies from 1811
- Part of: Imperial Guard
- Headquarters: Versailles
- Engagements: Battle of Paris (1814)

The Veterans Company of the Imperial Guard (French: Compagnie des Vétérans de la Garde Impériale) was a veterans and invalides unit of the French Imperial Guard serving under Napoleon Bonaparte in the Napoleonic Wars. The company was formed initially in July 1804 at the strength of one company, but in 1811 was expanded to two companies and became known as the Veterans of the Imperial Guard. The unit was finally disbanded in July 1814 following the restoration of the Bourbons.

== History ==
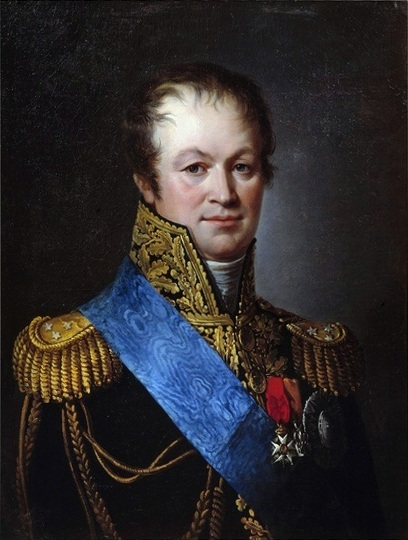
Portrait of Henri François Marie Charpentier, first commander of the company.

On 12 July 1801, First Consul Napoléon passed a decree which formed the Veterans Company of the Consular Guard. This company was based just outside of Paris at the Palace of Versailles. The establishment of the unit was as follows (in English): 1 x battalion chief (local rank of captain), 1 x lieutenant, 2 x second lieutenants, 1 x sergeant major, 4 x sergeants, 1 x quartermaster, 8 x corporals, 2 x drummers, and 120 x soldiers.

After formation, the company was commanded by a Chef de Bataillon (equivalent to the English Lieutenant Colonel), which on formation was Chef Henri François Marie Charpentier. In 1804, the company removed the term 'Consular', and replaced it with 'Imperial' following the Coronation of Napoleon in May. Following the unit's move into the Imperial Guard, a new felt hat was issued adorned with a red-white-blue coloured cockade.

In 1811, the company was expanded to two companies and subsequently redesignated as the Veterans of the Imperial Guard (French: Vétérans de la Garde Impériale). The company only saw action once, during the Battle of Paris in April 1814, where it defended the Pont de Neuilly. Rather unusually, under the terms of the Treaty of Fontainebleau, the company was allowed to be retained including being allowed to maintain its weapons and magazine. The company was disbanded on 1 July 1814 following the First Bourbon Restoration.

On 15 May 1814, the company was attached to the 1st (Old Guard) Division, part of the Imperial Guard Corps in Napoleon's main army. The company's strength was 3 officers and 132 other ranks for a total of 135 men.

== Uniform ==
The uniform of the veterans was similar to that of the 1st and 2nd Grenadier Regiments: 'republican blue' coatee with blue collar without piping, red square-ended lapels, also without piping; red cuffs with blue patches, red skirt lining with yellow grenades in the corners, cross pocket flaps piped red; yellow metal buttons; red epaulettes, and white waistcoats and breeches. The cap was a bicorne with a red pom-pom, and tricolour cockade. The cap had a red back with a white grenade imposed on-top. A copper grenade was ornamented on the flap of the cartridge box.
