= Lanne =

Lanne may refer to:

== People ==
- Colleen Lanne (born 1979), American swimmer
- William Lanne (1835-1869), Tasmanian aboriginal

== Places ==
- Lanne, Hautes-Pyrénées, France
- Lanne-Soubiran, Gers, France
- Lanne-en-Barétous, Pyrénées-Atlantiques, France
- Port-de-Lanne, Landes, France

== See also ==
- Lannes (disambiguation)
