= Jean Lannes =

Marshal of The First French Empire (1769–1809)

Marshal of the Empire Jean Lannes Duke of Montebello, Prince of Siewierz
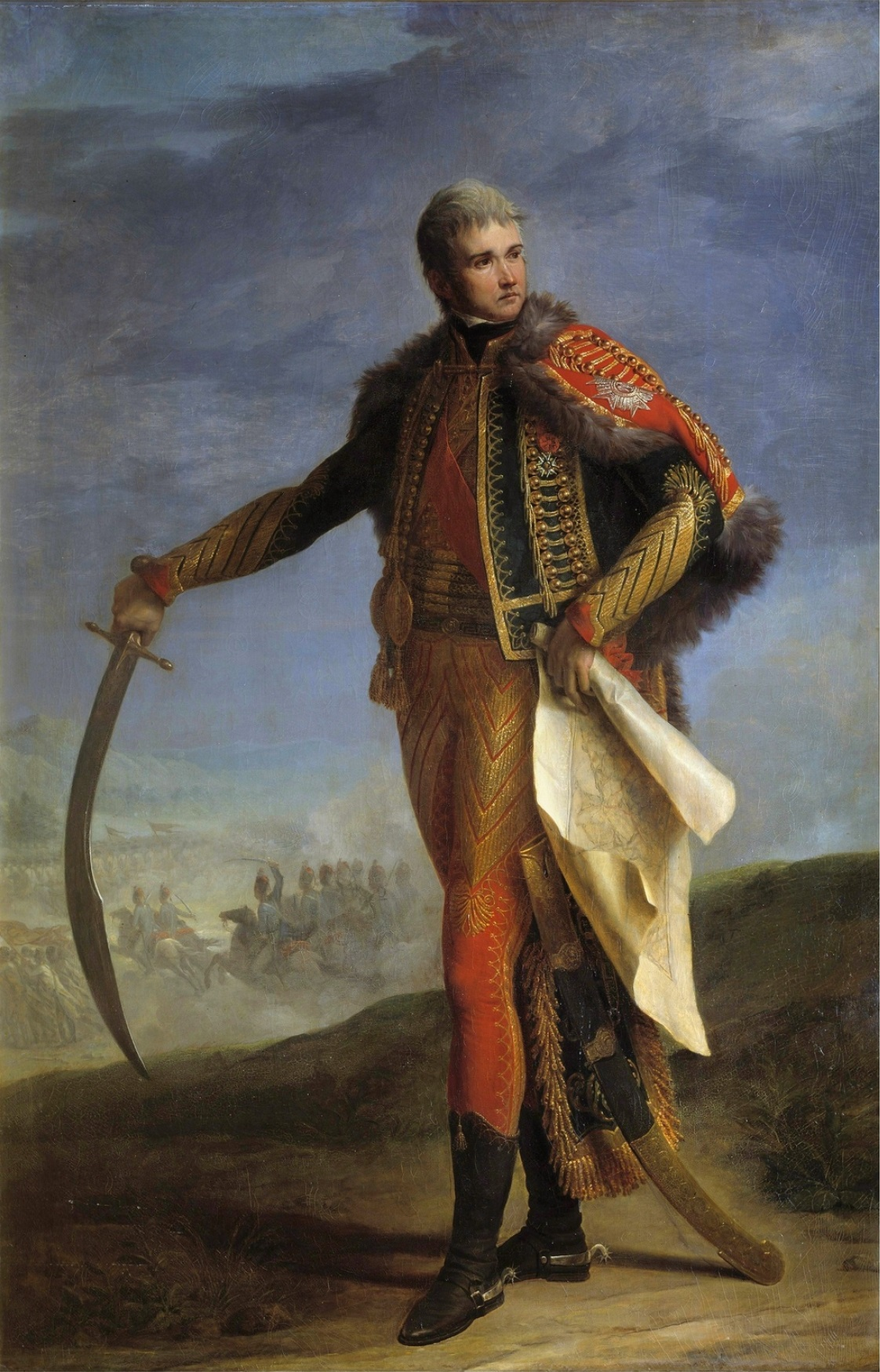
- Lannes in the uniform of colonel of the hussars, by Jean-Charles Nicaise Perrin (between 1805–1810)
- Born: 10 April 1769; Lectoure, Guyenne-Gascony, Kingdom of France
- Died: 31 May 1809 (aged 40); Ebersdorf, Lower Austria, Austria
- Burial place: Panthéon, Paris
- Spouses: Paulette Méric (m. 1795; ann. 1800) Louise Antoinette Lannes (m. 1800)
- Children: 5, including Gustave Olivier and Louis Napoléon
- Military career
- Allegiance: France
- Branch: French Army
- Service years: 1792–1809
- Rank: Marshal of the Empire
- Nicknames: Roland of the Grande Armée, Achilles of the Grande Armée
- Commands: V Corps; Consular Guard
- Conflicts: See battles: French Revolutionary Wars; War of the First Coalition; Battle of Loano; Second Battle of Dego; Battle of Bassano; Battle of San Giorgio; Battle of Arcole; Battle of Rivoli; French Campaign in Egypt; Siege of El Arish; Siege of Jaffa; Siege of Acre; Battle of Abukir; War of the Second Coalition; Battle of Chiusella River; Battle of Montebello; Battle of Marengo; Napoleonic Wars; War of the Third Coalition; Battle of Wertingen; Battle of Ulm; Battle of Amstetten; Battle of Schöngrabern; Battle of Austerlitz; War of the Fourth Coalition; Battle of Saalfeld; Battle of Jena–Auerstedt; Battle of Pułtusk; Battle of Heilsberg; Battle of Friedland; Peninsular War; Battle of Tudela; Siege of Zaragoza; War of the Fifth Coalition; Battle of Abensberg; Battle of Landshut; Battle of Eckmühl; Battle of Ratisbon; Battle of Aspern-Essling †
- Awards: Grand Cross of the Legion of Honour; Commander of the Order of the Iron Crown; Duke of the Empire

Jean Lannes, 1st Duke of Montebello, Prince of Siewierz (English: /ˈlæn/ LAN, French: [ʒɑ̃ lan]; 10 April 1769 – 31 May 1809), was a French military commander and a Marshal of the Empire who served during both the French Revolutionary and Napoleonic Wars.

He was one of Napoleon's most daring and talented generals, and is regarded by many as one of history's greatest military commanders. Napoleon once commented on Lannes: "I found him a pygmy and left him a giant". A personal friend of the emperor, he was allowed to address him with the familiar tu, as opposed to the formal vous.

== Early life ==
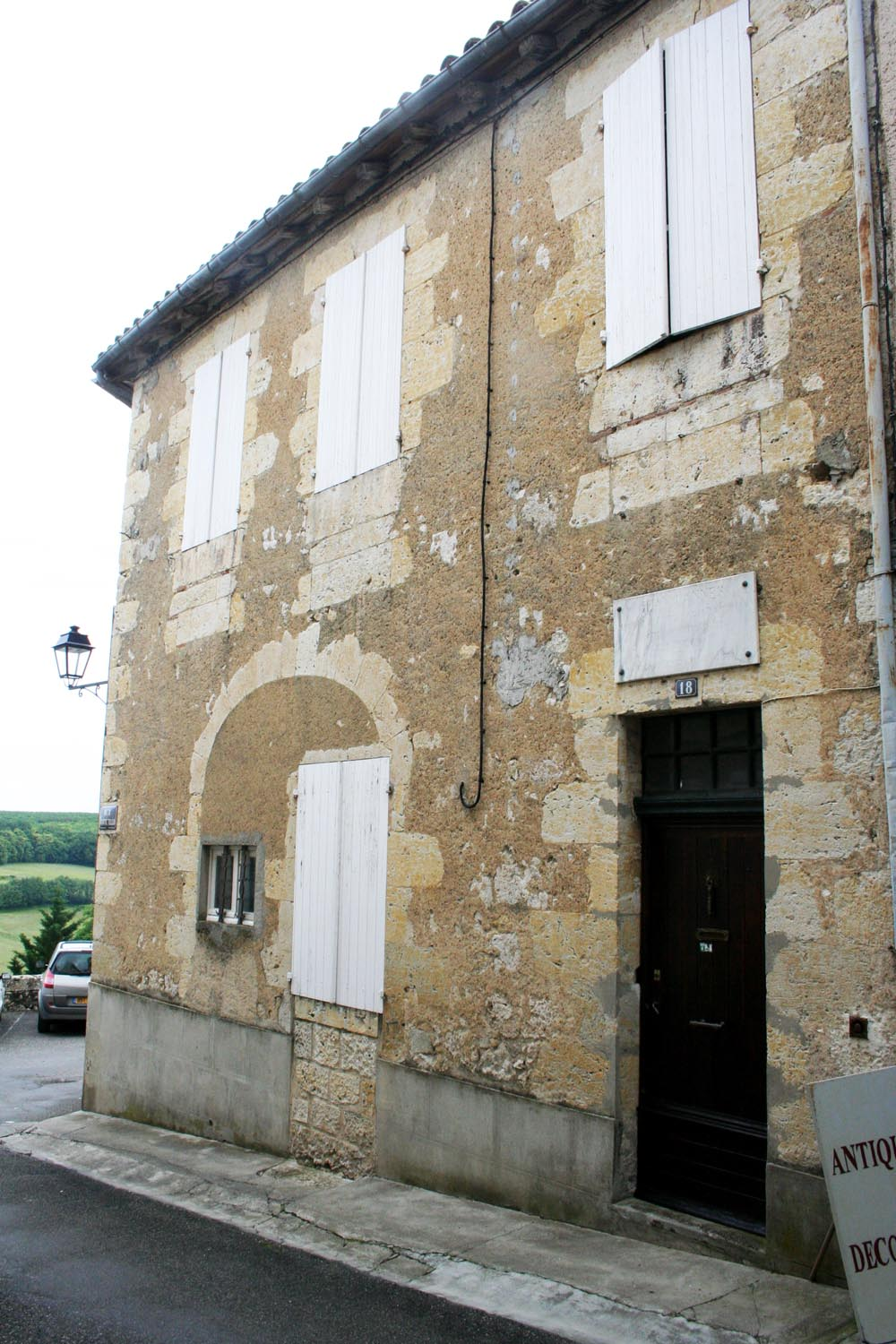
Lannes' birthplace in Lectoure

Lannes was born in the small town of Lectoure, in the province of Gascony in Southern France. He was the son of a small landowner and merchant, Jeannet Lannes (1733–1812), son of Jean Lannes (died 1746), a farmer, and his wife, Jeanne Pomiès (died 1770), and paternal grandson of Pierre Lane and wife Bernarde Escossio (both died in 1721), and wife Cécile Fouraignan (1741–1799), daughter of Bernard Fouraignan and wife Jeanne Marguerite Laconstère. He was apprenticed in his teens to a dyer. Lannes received little education, but his great strength and proficiency in many sports caused him in 1792 to be elected sergeant-major of the battalion of volunteers of Gers, which he had joined upon the outbreak of war between France and Spain. He served under General Jean-Antoine Marbot during the campaigns in the Pyrenees in 1793 and 1794, and rose by distinguished conduct to the rank of chef de brigade. During his time in the Pyrenees, Lannes was given some important tasks by General Jacques François Dugommier and recommended for promotion by future Marshal Louis-Nicolas Davout.

== Campaigns of Italy and Egypt ==
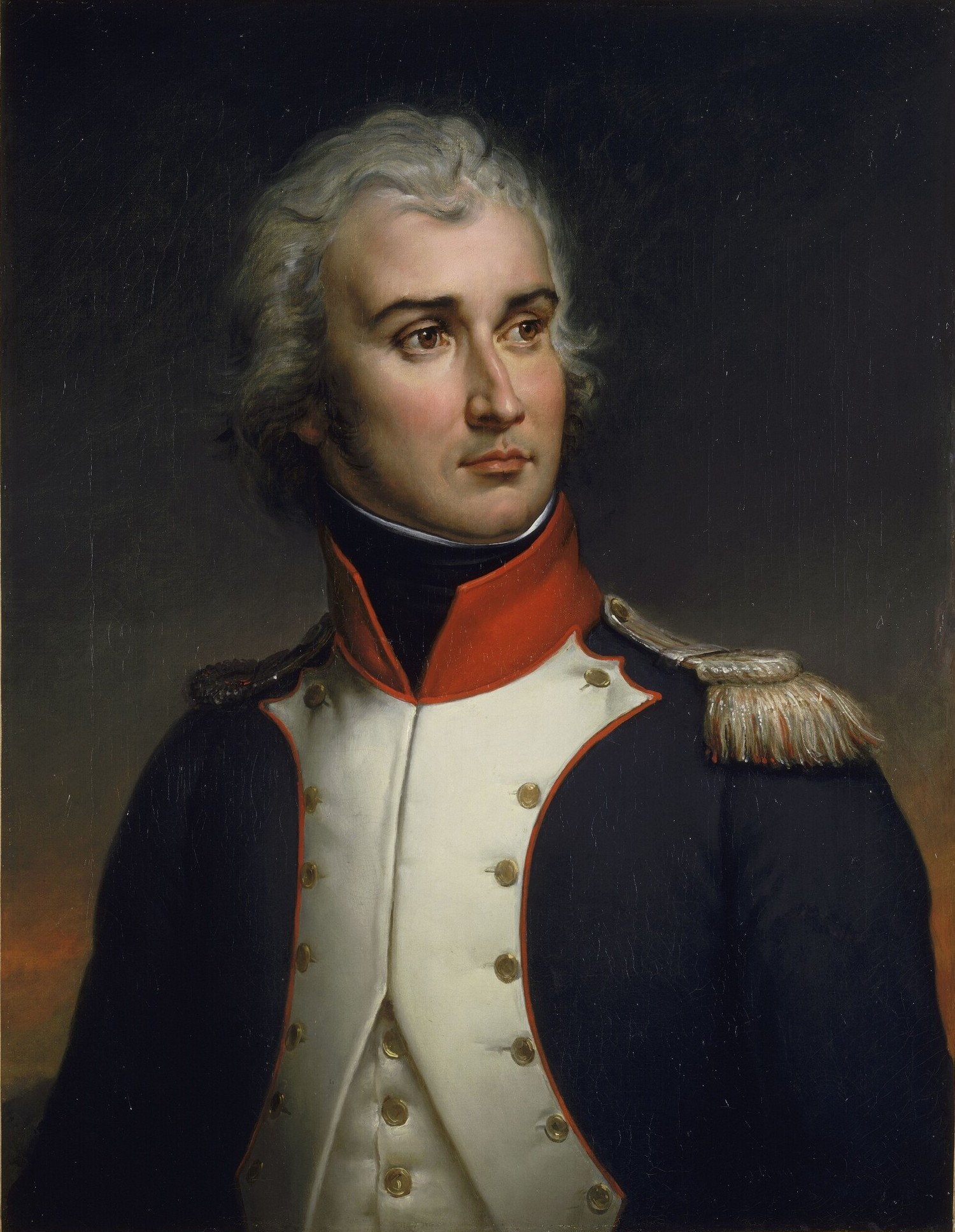
Lannes as a Sous-lieutenant of the 2nd Battalion of the Gers in 1792, by Jean-Baptiste Paulin Guérin (1835)

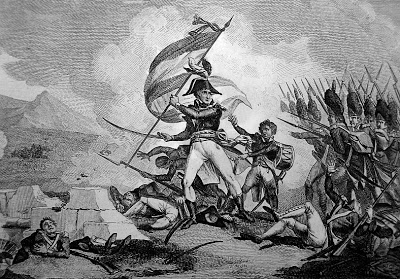
Lannes at the Battle of Bassano, 1796

Lannes served under General Barthélemy Louis Joseph Schérer, taking part in the Battle of Loano. However, in 1795, as a result of the reforms of the army introduced by the Thermidorians, he was dismissed from his rank. He re-enlisted as a simple volunteer in the French Armée d'Italie. He served in the Italian campaign of 1796, and climbed his way up to high rank once again, being given command of a brigade in General Charles-Pierre Augereau's division and later of 3 battalions of the permanent advance guard at different times. Lannes was distinguished in every battle and played an important role in the victory at Dego. At the Battle of Bassano, he captured two enemy flags with his own hands and received multiple wounds at the Battle of Arcole but kept leading his column in person.

Lannes led troops under Claude Victor-Perrin in the invasion of the Papal States. When he and a small reconnaissance party ran into 300 Papal cavalry, he averted danger by astutely ordering the cavalry to return to base, convincing them not to attack.

He was chosen by Bonaparte to accompany him to Egypt as commander in one of General Jean-Baptiste Kléber's brigades, in which capacity he greatly distinguished himself, especially during the retreat from Syria. Lannes was wounded at the Battle of Abukir, before he returned to France with Bonaparte, and assisted him in the Coup of 18 Brumaire. After Bonaparte's takeover and appointment as Consul of France, Lannes was promoted to the ranks of general of division and commandant of the Consular Guard.

Back with the Armée d'Italie, Lannes commanded the advanced guard in the crossing of the Alps in 1800, was instrumental in winning the Battle of Montebello, from which he afterwards took his title, and played a large part in the Battle of Marengo.

== Napoleonic Wars ==
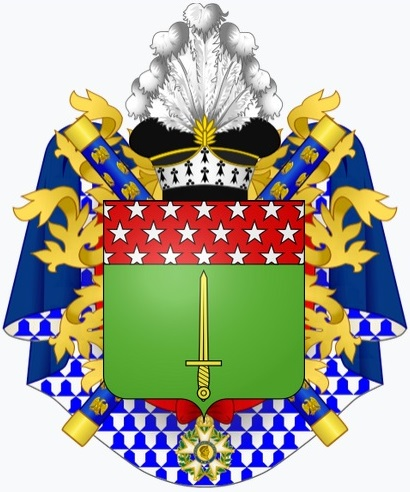
Heraldic achievement of Jean Lannes, Duke of Montebello

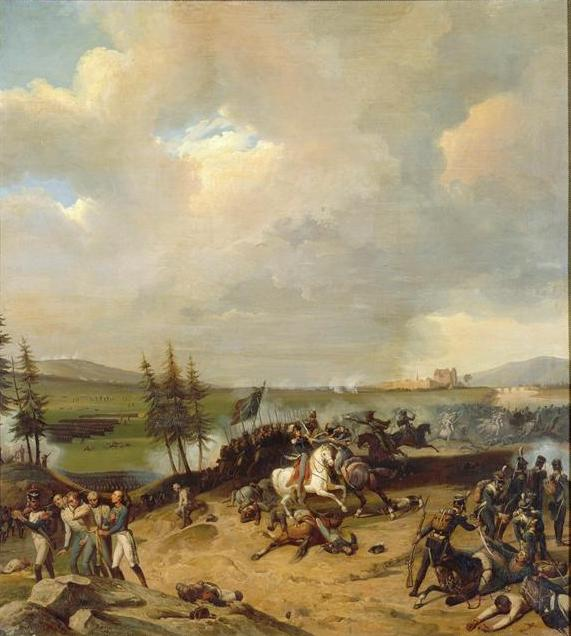
Lannes' victory at the Battle of Saalfeld, 1806

General Joachim Murat and Chef de brigade Jean-Baptiste Bessières schemed to have Lannes removed over a budget deficit, but Augereau bailed him out. As a result, Lannes was not totally disgraced, but was instead sent as ambassador to Portugal in 1801. Opinions differ as to his merits in this capacity; Napoleon never made such use of him again. Lannes purchased the seventeenth-century Château de Maisons, near Paris, in 1804 and had one of its state apartments redecorated for a visit from Napoleon.

Upon the establishment of the First French Empire, he was made one of the original eighteen Marshals of the Empire. In 1805, he fully regained Napoleon's favour, which he lost during the consulate. At Austerlitz, he commanded the left wing of the Grande Armée. During the War of the Fourth Coalition, Lannes was at his best, commanding his corps with the greatest credit in the march through the Thuringian Forest, the Battle of Saalfeld (which is studied as a model today at the French Staff College), and the Battle of Jena. His leadership of the advance guard at Friedland was even more prominent.

In 1807, Napoleon recreated the Duchy of Siewierz (Sievers), granting it to Lannes after Prussia was forced to cede all her acquisitions from the second and third partitions of Poland.

After this, Lannes was to be tested as a commander-in-chief, for Napoleon sent him to Spain in 1808 and gave him a detached wing of the army to command, with which he won a crushing victory over General Francisco Castaños at Tudela on 22 November. In January 1809, he was sent to capture Zaragoza, and by 21 February, after one of the most stubborn defences in history, Lannes was in possession of the place. He later said, "this damned Bonaparte is going to get us all killed" after his last campaign in Spain. In 1808, Napoleon made him Duke of Montebello, and in 1809, for the last time, gave him command of the advance guard. He took part in the engagements around Eckmühl and the advance on Vienna. With his corps, he led the French Army across the Danube River and bore the brunt, with Marshal André Masséna, at the Battle of Aspern-Essling.

== Personal life ==
Lannes married twice, in Perpignan on 19 March 1795 to Paulette Méric, whom he divorced because of infidelity in 1800, after she had given birth to an illegitimate son while he was serving in Egypt:

- Jean-Claude Lannes de Montebello (Montauban, 12 February 1799 – 1817), who died unmarried and without issue,

His second marriage was at Dornes on 16 September 1800 to Louise Antoinette, Comtesse de Guéhéneuc (Paris, 26 February 1782 – Paris, 3 July 1856), by whom he had five children:

- Louis Napoléon (30 July 1801 – 19 July 1874)
- Alfred-Jean (11 July 1802 – 20 June 1861)
- Jean-Ernest (20 July 1803 – 24 November 1882)
- Gustave-Olivier (4 December 1804 – 25 August 1875)
- Josephine-Louise (4 March 1806 – 8 November 1889)

One succeeded in his titles and three others used the courtesy title of baron. One of his direct descendants, Philippe Lannes de Montebello, was the director of the Metropolitan Museum of Art until 2008.

== Death and legacy ==
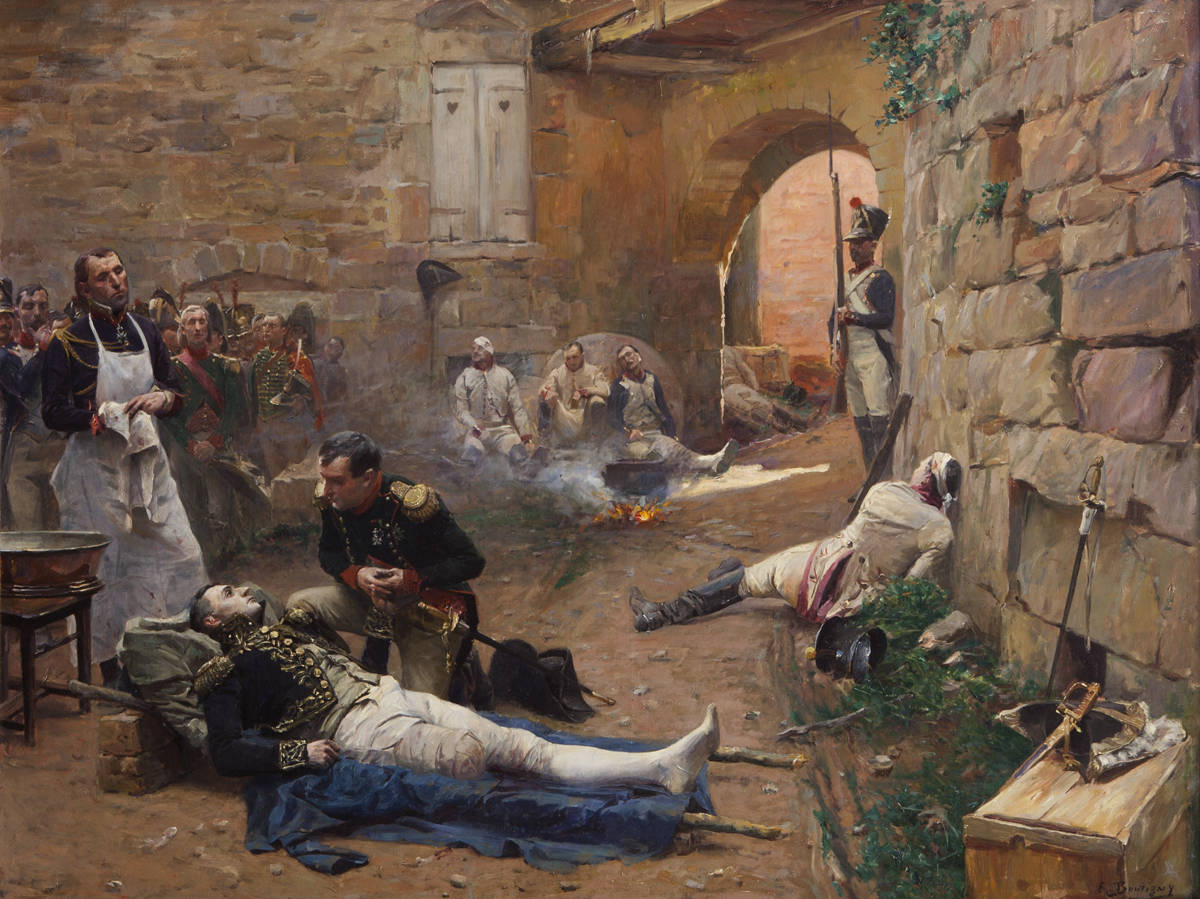
Lannes' death at Essling, 1809 (Note: The incorrect leg is shown as amputated; in reality Lannes' left leg was taken))

On 22 May 1809, during a lull in the second day of the Battle of Aspern-Essling, Lannes went and sat down at the edge of a ditch, his hand over his eyes and his legs crossed.

As he sat there, plunged in gloomy meditation on having seen his friend, General Pierre Charles Pouzet, decapitated mid-conversation by a cannonball, a second cannonball fired from a gun at Enzersdorf ricocheted and struck him just where his legs crossed. The knee-pan of one was smashed, and the back sinews of the other torn. The marshal said "I am wounded; it's nothing much; give me your hand to help me up." He tried to rise, but could not.

He was carried to the tête de pont, where the chief surgeons proceeded to dress his wound. Lannes' left leg was amputated within two minutes by Dominique Jean Larrey. He bore the painful operation with courage; it was hardly over when Napoleon came up and, kneeling beside the stretcher, wept as he embraced the marshal. On 23 May, he was transported by boat to the finest house in Kaiserebersdorf, now a part of Simmering district of Vienna. Eight days later, on 31 May, Lannes died from his painful wounds at daybreak. Napoleon commented on Lannes' death by saying "I have lost the most distinguished general in my army, my companion in arms for sixteen years, and my best friend."

He was initially buried in Les Invalides, Paris, but in 1810, he was exhumed and reinterred in the Panthéon national after a grandiose ceremony.

A chocolate cake, the "Gâteau au chocolat de la Maréchale de Lannes", is named after his wife, and in turn, him as well.

== Assessment ==
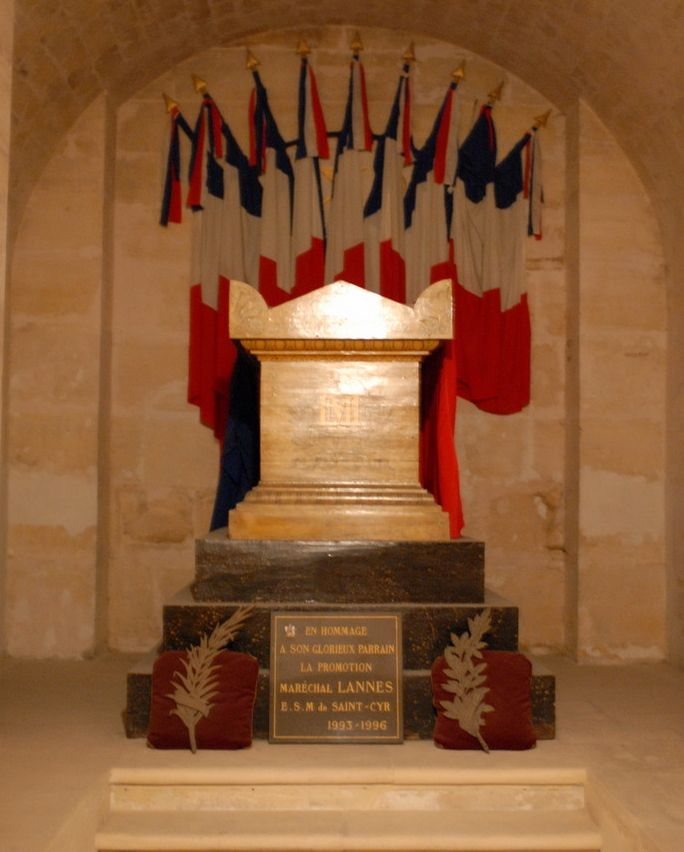
Lannes' tomb in the Panthéon

Lannes has been compared to the likes of Louis-Nicolas Davout, Louis-Gabriel Suchet, and André Masséna as one of the most competent and trusted of Napoleon's marshals. He was continually employed in some of the most dangerous and difficult tasks, most notably when the emperor's tactics demanded him to lead the advanced guard during the preparatory fighting, such as at Friedland and at Aspern (much in the same way as Davout did at Austerlitz and at Auerstedt). This involved commanding a detachment or fraction of the army through long hours of fighting, against possibly two to one odds, in order to prepare the way for Napoleon's own final assault. Napoleon's estimate of his subordinates' capacities as a commander can almost exactly be judged by the frequency with which he used them for preparatory fighting. Dependable generals with the usual military virtues, or careful and exact troop leaders like Jean-de-Dieu Soult and Étienne Macdonald, Napoleon kept under his direct control for the final assault. However, he entrusted the preparatory fighting to Lannes, whom he deemed extraordinary enough. In Napoleon's own words, he found Lannes a pigmy, and lost him a giant.

== Citations ==
- Clausewitz, Carl von (2018). Napoleon's 1796 Italian Campaign. Trans and ed. Nicholas Murray and Christopher Pringle. Lawrence, Kansas: University Press of Kansas. ISBN 978-0-7006-2676-2
- Dunn-Pattison, R. P. (1909), Napoleon's Marshals, Little, Brown & co., ISBN 9781428629264
