= Consular Guard =

- Garde des consuls
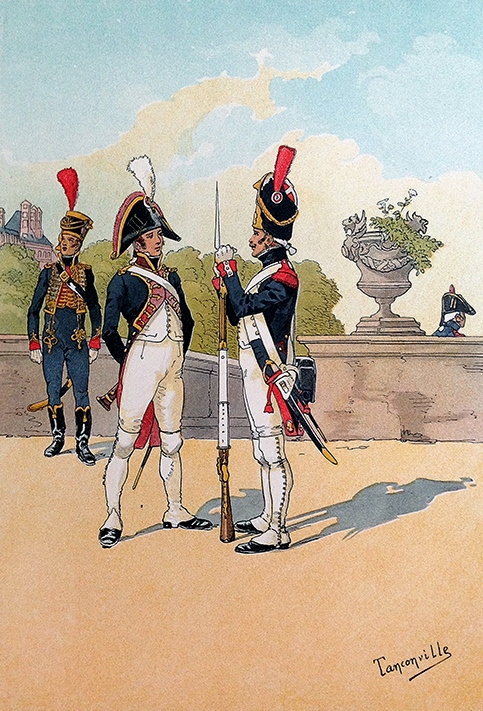
- Marine, musician of the grenadiers and grenadier of the Consular Guard
- Active: 28 November 1799 – 18 May 1804
- Country: French Republic
- Type: Infantry, cavalry, artillery
- Role: Close protection
- Size: 2,089 (1799)
- Engagements: War of the Second Coalition; Battle of Montebello; Battle of Marengo

Commanders
- Notable commanders: Joachim Murat; Jean-Baptiste Bessières; Jean Lannes

The Consular Guard (French: Garde consulaire), also known as the Guard of the Consuls (Garde des consuls), was a French military unit responsible for the protection of the members of the Consulate, the executive government of France during the late First Republic. It was created by First Consul Napoleon Bonaparte in 1799, after the Coup of 18 Brumaire, and renamed the Imperial Guard in 1804, when Bonaparte was proclaimed Emperor of the French.

== Origins ==
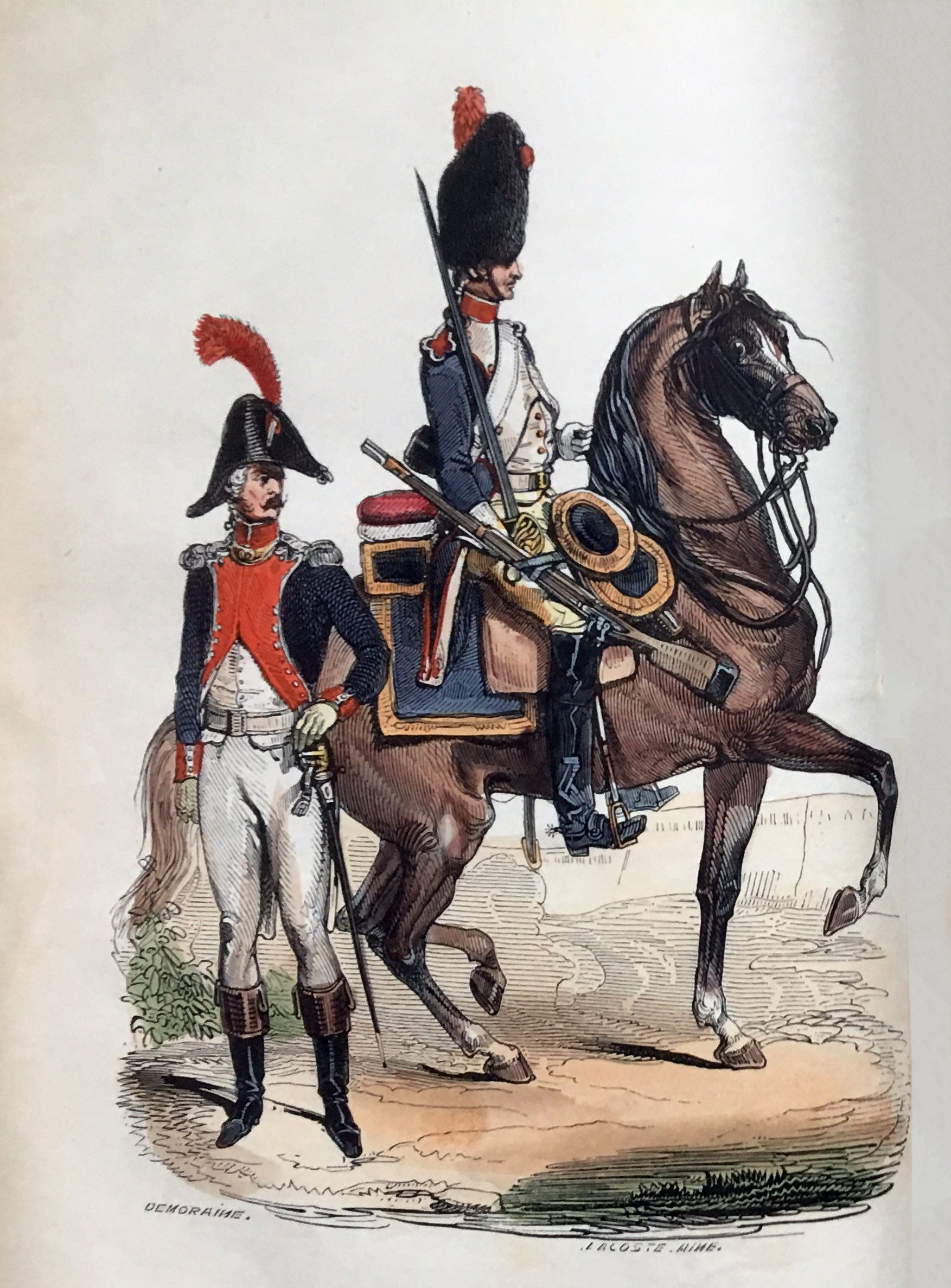
Officer of the Guard of the Convention and cavalryman of the Guard of the Directory

The Consular Guard traced its origins to the various units in charge of the security of the legislative and executive bodies created during the French Revolution. The first of these formations was the company-sized Garde de la prévôté de l'Hôtel, formed at the start of the Revolution to provide security to the deputies of the National Assembly; it was renamed the Garde de l'Assemblée nationale on 20 June 1789. A decree from 10 May 1791 changed its name to Gendarmes nationaux, and another from 15 May renamed it the Grenadiers gendarmes près la représentation nationale. In 1792, the company became responsible for protecting the National Convention, and was commonly referred to as the "Guards of the Convention" (gardes de la Convention).

On 26 October 1795, the National Convention was replaced by a bicameral parliament, and the guards became the "Guard of the Legislature" (Garde du corps législatif), comprising 1,200 men selected by the French Directory. A "Guard of the Directory" (Garde du Directoire) was also established that year. On 28 November 1799, eighteen days after seizing power in the Coup of 18 Brumaire and establishing the Consulate, Bonaparte reorganized both units into a new "Consular Guard". In addition to the previous guard formations, the new unit included Bonaparte's corps of Guides, who had followed him since the Italian campaign of 1796–1797. Within the Consular Guard, the Guard of the Legislature became the Foot Grenadiers (grenadiers à pied), while the Guides became the Mounted Chasseurs (chasseurs à cheval). On 2 December 1799, Bonaparte appointed General Joachim Murat as commander-in-chief and inspector of the Guard, with General Jean-Baptiste Bessières as second-in-command.

== Composition and numbers ==
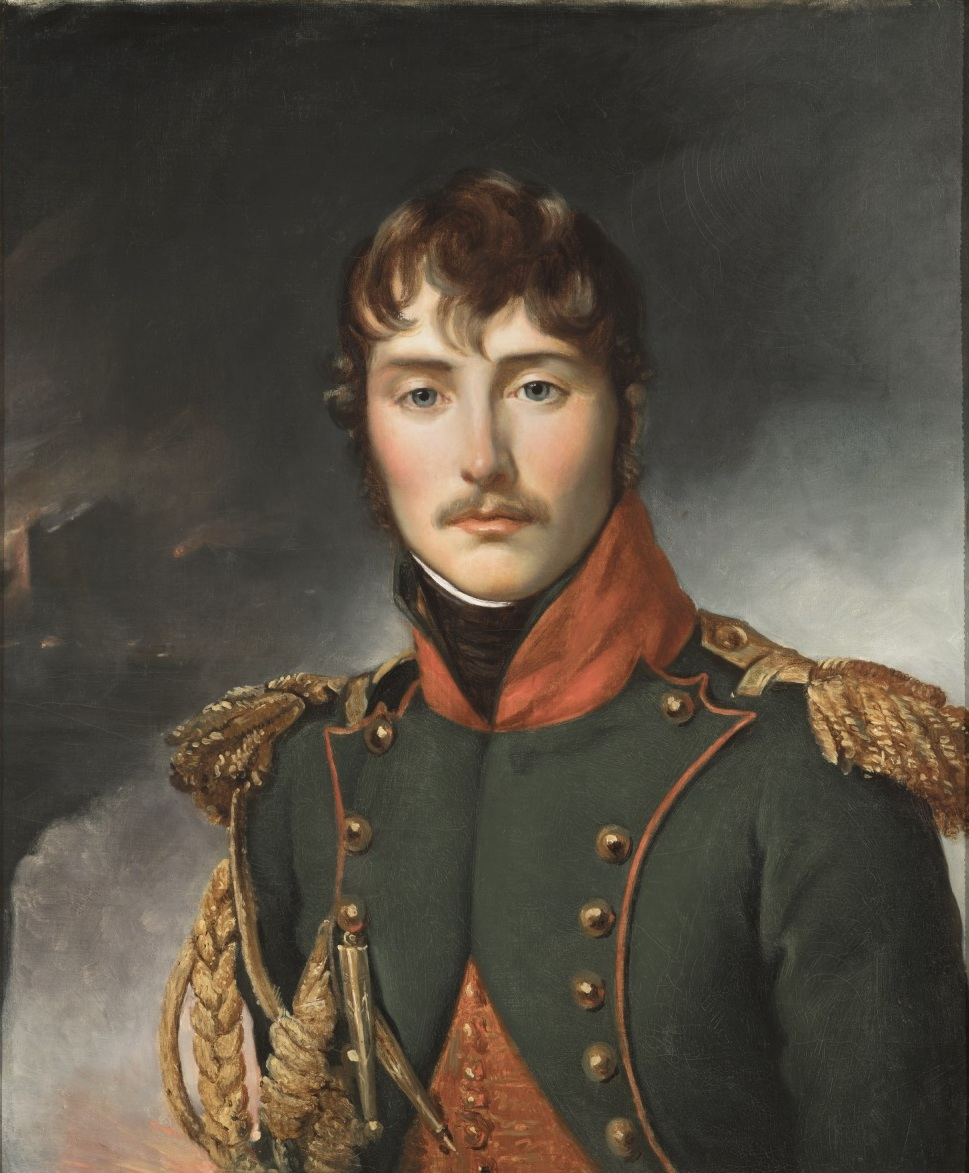
Eugène de Beauharnais in the uniform of colonel of the Consular Guard's Mounted Chasseurs, c. 1802

On its formation, the Consular Guard consisted of 2,089 men, including:

- 1,188 Foot Grenadiers (2 battalions)
- 99 Foot Chasseurs (1 company)
- 468 Mounted Grenadiers (2 companies)
- 117 Mounted Chasseurs (1 company)
- 110 Mounted Artillerymen (1 company)
- 71 general staff personnel, as well as a staff of 17 men for the infantry and 19 for the cavalry

The Guard was expanded over the following years, with the creation of an Artillery Train Company on 14 July 1800, a Veterans Company on 28 June 1801, an Elite Gendarmerie on 31 July 1801, a Marine Battalion on 20 December 1803, and two corps of velites on 21 January 1804. The Guard's general staff was reorganized by decree on 14 November 1801; the posts of commander-in-chief and second-in-command were abolished and replaced by four general officers, each commanding one of the Guard's branches (foot grenadiers, foot chasseurs, cavalry, and artillery).

On 8 March 1802, a decree of the Consuls reorganized and expanded the Consular Guard. The total contingent was increased to 281 officers and 5,043 troopers, for a total 5,324 men (along with 2,070 horses). The decree reorganized the Guard as follows:

- 2 battalions of Foot Grenadiers (each with 8 companies)
- 2 battalions of Foot Chasseurs (each with 8 companies)
- 1 regiment of Mounted Grenadiers (4 squadrons, each with 2 companies)
- 1 regiment of Mounted Chasseurs (2 squadrons, each with 2 companies)
- 1 squadron of Mounted Artillery
- 1 Artillery Train company
- 1 Veterans company

== Service history ==
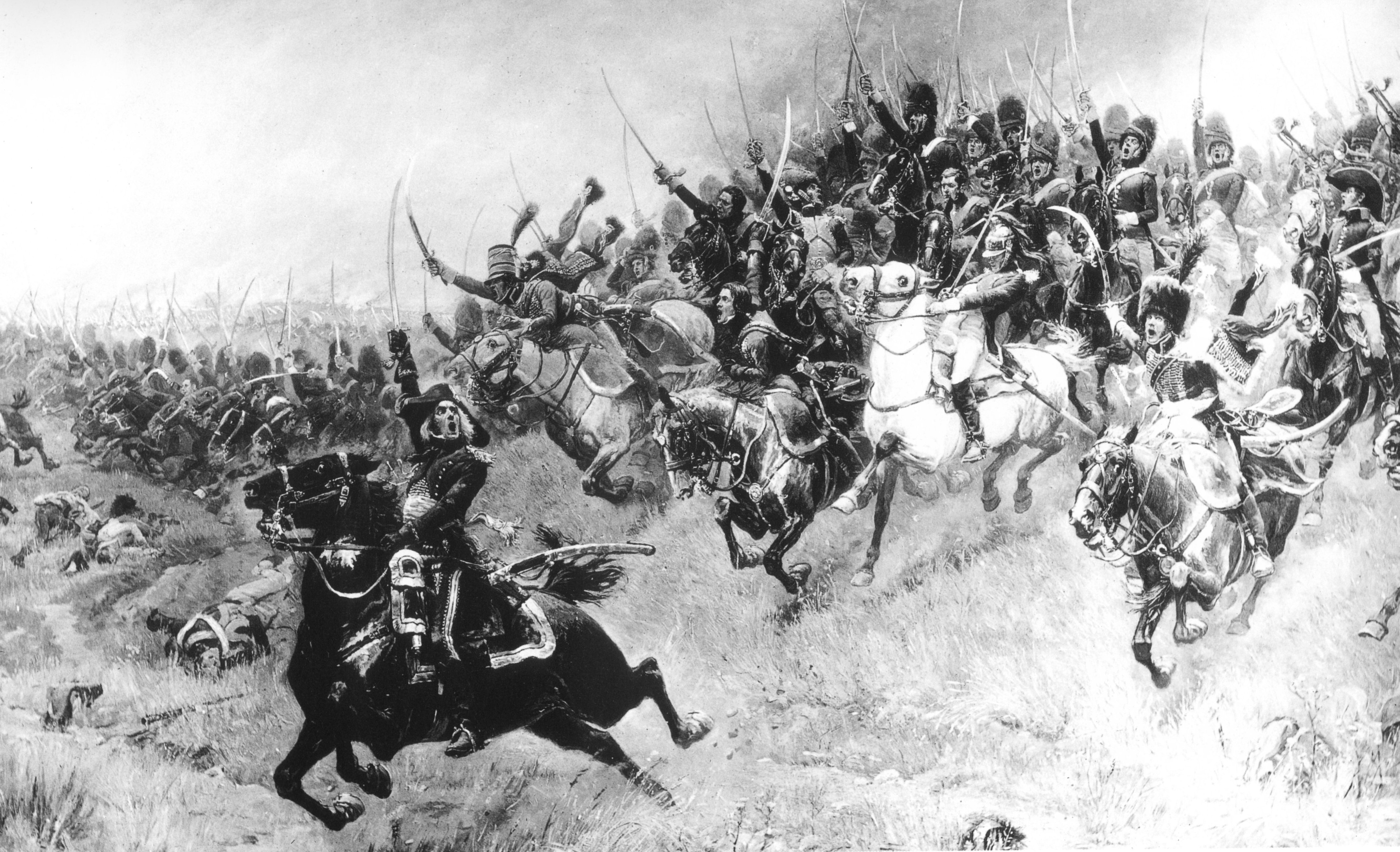
Charge of the Consular Guard cavalry at Marengo, 14 June 1800: the Mounted Grenadiers and Mounted Chasseurs led by Bessières (in the foreground) rush on the Austrian cavalry

Unlike the Imperial Guard during the Napoleonic Wars, the Consular Guard only saw action on rare occasions, generally when the situation urgently demanded its intervention. It was thus deployed on 14 June 1800, at the Battle of Marengo, where, from the start of the battle, the disproportion of forces played against the First Consul. Bonaparte found himself engaged in combat after having ordered several divisions to scout. The Consular Guard assumed a square formation in the center of the French army and repelled the Austrian cavalry under General Peter Ott. Numbering 800 against several thousand Austrians, the Guard resisted for five hours, giving time for General Louis Desaix's troops to arrive on the battlefield. It only withdrew after five hours of combat and was reduced to 200 men. The Battle of Marengo was Bonaparte's first victory as head of state, and his Consular Guard, which he spoke of as a "fortress of granite", had covered itself with glory.

== See also ==
- Republican Guard (France)
- Imperial Guard (Napoleon III)
