= Duc de Montebello =

Noble Title created by Napoleon

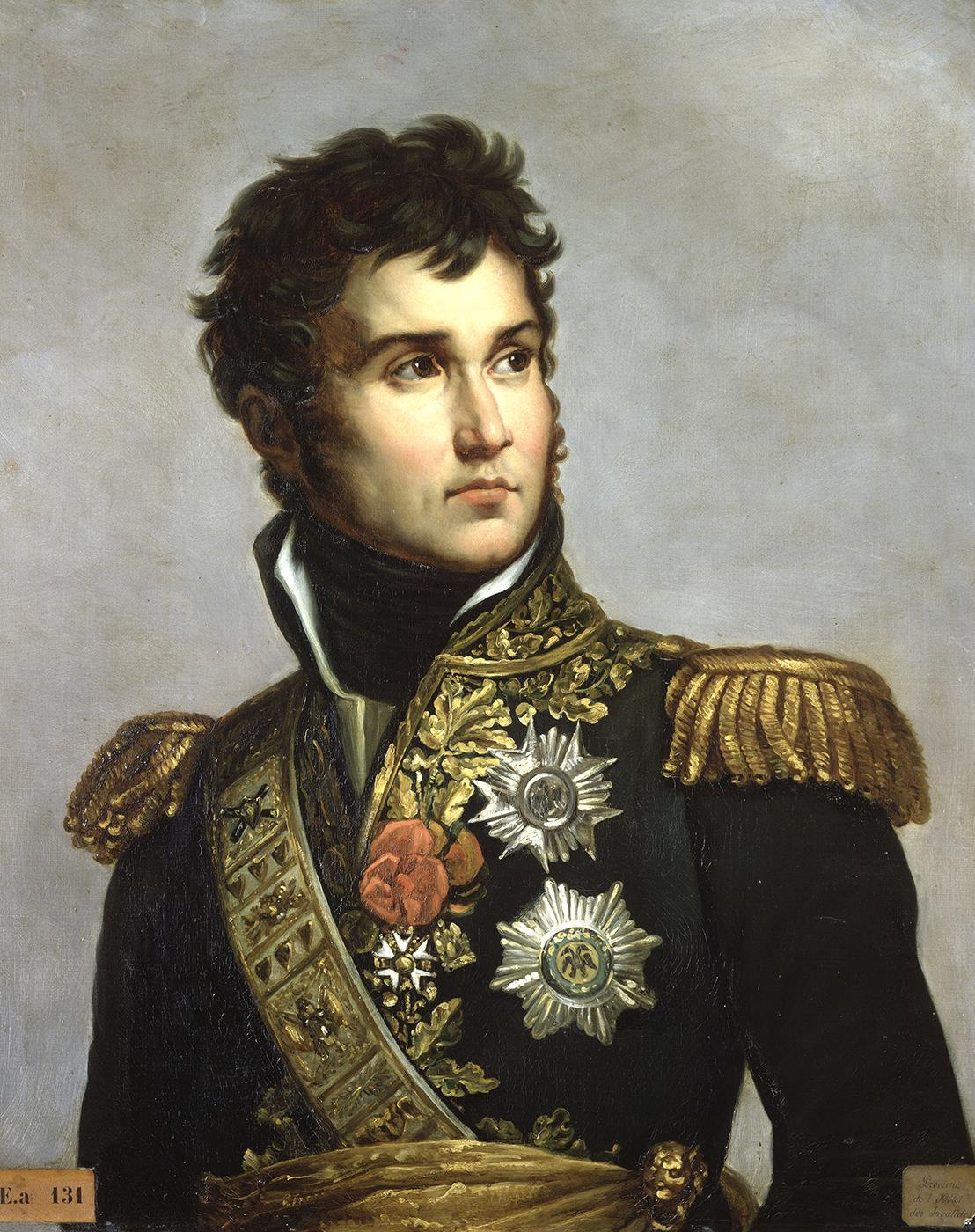
Marshal Jean Lannes, by Julie Volpelière (after François Gérard)

Duke of Montebello (French: duc de Montebello) is a title created by French Emperor Napoleon I in 1808 as a victory title for Marshal Jean Lannes, one of Napoleon's most daring and talented generals. Lannes commanded the advance guard in the crossing of the Alps in 1800 and was instrumental in winning the Battle of Montebello.

== Dukes of Montebello (1808) ==
- Jean Lannes, 1st Duke of Montebello (10 April 1769 – 31 May 1809)

He was succeeded by his second son:

- Louis Napoléon, 2nd Duke of Montebello (Paris 30 July 1801 – Mareuil-sur-Ay 19 July 1874)

m. 10 July 1830 Eleanor Jenkinson (7 February 1810 – St. Petersburg 11 October 1863), daughter of Sir Charles Jenkinson
He was succeeded by his eldest son:

- Napoléon Camille Charles Jean, 3rd Duke of Montebello (30 October 1835 – Pau 30 November 1876)

m. Pau 12 August 1873 Laure Joséphine Marie Daguilhon
He was succeeded by his only son:

- Napoléon Barbe Joseph Jean, 4th Duke of Montebello (9 April 1877 – 27 January 1899)

He was succeeded by his uncle:

- Charles Louis Maurice, 5th Duke of Montebello (Bern 27 October 1836 – Paris 23 December 1922)

m. Paris 24 Oct 1865 Thérèse O'Tard de la Grange-Keith (Cognac 23 January 1844 – Montendre 2 November 1915)
He was succeeded by his grandson:

- Napoléon Jean Jules, 6th Duke of Montebello (Paris 5 March 1903 – château de Mareuil 22 May 1988)

m. 1st Paris 15 Apr 1925 Marie d'Albert de Luynes (Paris 15 November 1898 – Paris 31 January 1929)
m. 2nd Guéthary 2 Jun 1930 Princess Diane de Broglie (Paris 28 April 1907 – La Tour Blanche 12 May 1987)
He was succeeded by his elder son:

- Maurice Georges Antoine Marie, 7th Duke of Montebello (born Biarritz 2 July 1939 – 26 March 2022)

m. Celettes 23 October 1971 Christina Meyer-Ratken (born Röpke, Germany 12 April 1937)
He was succeeded by his son:

- Benoît Alexandre Marie Emmanuel Lannes, 8th Duke of Montebello (born Blois 15 August 1973)

The presumptive heirs to the title were, from 1988 to 2004, Jean-Michel Christophe Marie Louis Lannes de Montebello (August 15, 1972, Blois - August 7, 2004), Marquis of Montebello (eldest son of the 7th Duke), who was succeeded on his death in 2004 by his younger brother, Benoît Alexandre Marie Emmanuel Lannes de Montebello (born in 1973), Marquis of Montebello. Since 2022, this is the uncle of the current Duke, brother of the 7th Duke, Charles-Emmanuel Dominique François Lannes de Montebello (born in 1942)
