= Gustave Olivier Lannes de Montebello =

French General, Politician and Fourth Son of Marshal Jean Lannes

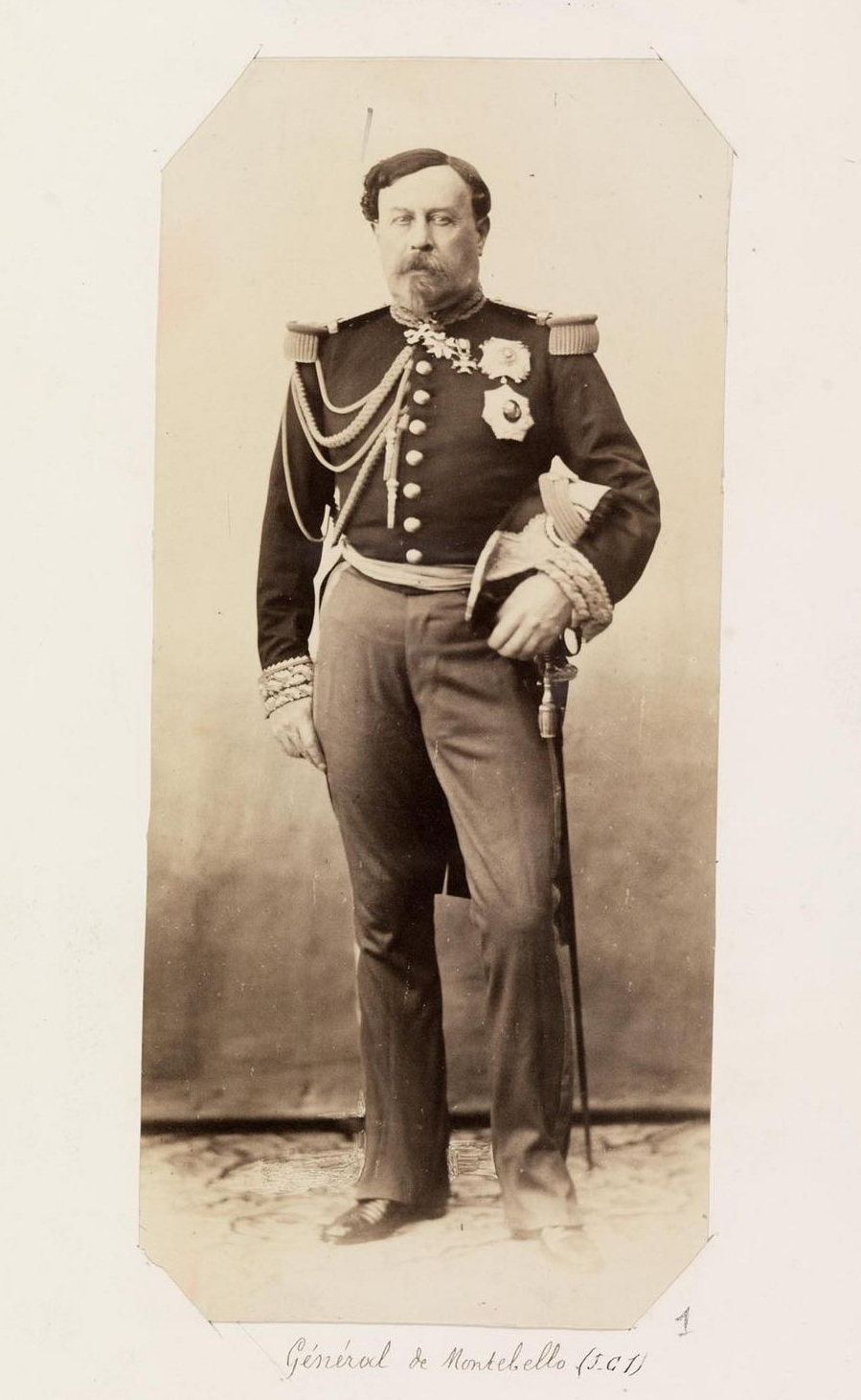
Portrait by Gustave Le Gray

Gustave Olivier Lannes de Montebello (born 4 December 1804 in Paris; died 29 August 1875 in Château de Blosseville, Pennedepie) was a French general and politician. He was the fourth and last son of Marshal Jean Lannes. From 1867 to 1870 he was a Senator in the Second French Empire.

He was awarded the Grand Cross of the Legion of Honour.

== Gallery ==
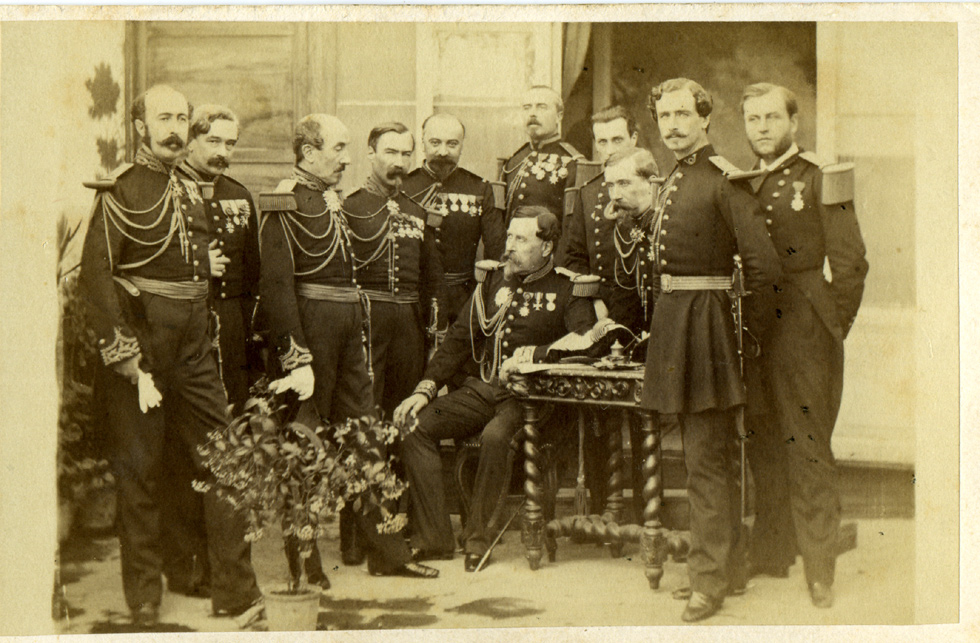
In Italy (1863)

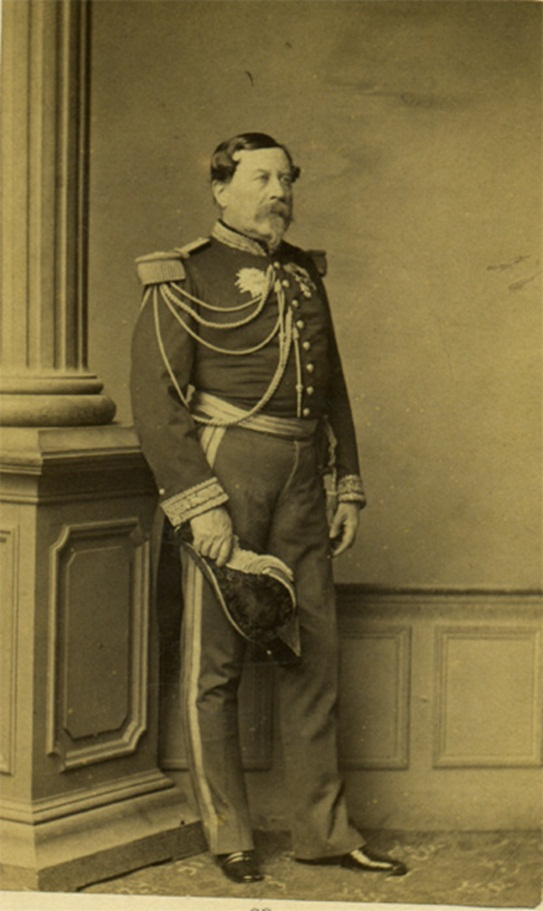

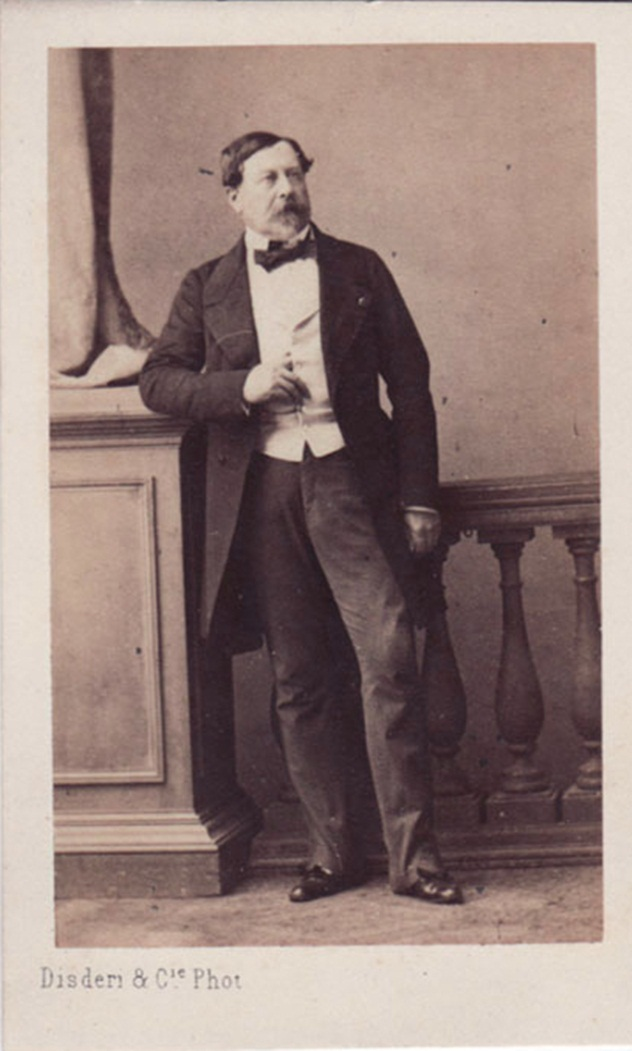
A photographic portrait by Andre Adolphe Eugène Disderi
