= Lists of battles of the French Revolutionary Wars and Napoleonic Wars =

These are lists of battles of the French Revolutionary and Napoleonic Wars (1792–1815).

== Coalition Wars ==
- List of battles of the War of the First Coalition (20 April 1792 – 18 October 1797)
- List of battles of the War of the Second Coalition (1798/9 – 1801/2)
- List of battles of the War of the Third Coalition (1803/1805–1805/1806)
- List of battles of the War of the Fourth Coalition (9 October 1806 – 9 July 1807)
- List of battles of the War of the Fifth Coalition (10 April – 14 October 1809)
- List of battles of the War of the Sixth Coalition (3 March 1813 – 30 May 1814)
- List of battles of the Hundred Days (War of the Seventh Coalition) (15/20 March – 8 July / 16 August 1815)

== Other French Revolutionary Wars ==
- Haitian Revolution (21 August 1791 – 1 January 1804)
- War of the Pyrenees (7 March 1793 – 22 July 1795)
- War in the Vendée § Vendée military response (3 March 1793 – 16 July 1796)
- French invasion of Switzerland § Battles (28 January – 17 May 1798)

Naval warfare:

- Naval campaigns, operations and battles of the French Revolutionary Wars

== Other Napoleonic Wars ==
- Timeline of the Peninsular War (1807/8–1815)
- Franco-Swedish War (1805–1810)
- British invasions of the River Plate (1806–1807)
- Gunboat War (1807–1814)
- Timeline of the Adriatic campaign of 1807–1814
- Timeline of the Finnish War (1808–1809)
- Dano-Swedish War of 1808–1809
- List of battles of the French invasion of Russia (24 June – 14/18 December 1812)

== See also ==
- Attrition warfare against Napoleon
- Battles inscribed on the Arc de Triomphe
- List of battles involving France
- List of wars involving France
- List of Marshals of the First French Empire
- Military career of Napoleon
