= Siege of Pressburg =

Siege during the War of the Fifth Coalition

- Part of the War of the Fifth Coalition
- The bombardment of Pressburg by the French in 1809
Date	1 June – 12 July 1809 (1 month)
Location	Poszony, Kingdom of Hungary (Now Bratislava, Slovakia)
Result	Austrian & Hungarian victory

Belligerents
France	(Austrian Empire) Austria (Austrian Empire) Kingdom of Hungary

Commanders and leaders
(First French Empire) Louis Nicholas Davout	(Austrian Empire) Frederick Bianchi

The Siege of Pressburg took place between June and July 1809 during the War of the Fifth Coalition, when French forces attacked and bombarded the city of Pressburg (modern-day Bratislava), then part of the Austrian Empire. The French reach Pressburg after they expanded their territorial control following the Siege of Vienna a month earlier. Although the city suffered extensive bombardment and damage, French forces had been unable to bring about Pressburg’s defeat, only occupying Pressburg following the armistice of Znaim after the city opened its gates. As the city was not fully invested, the siege of Pressburg was considered a partial siege.

== Background ==
In April 1809 Austrian forces under Archduke Charles invaded Bavaria before being defeated by Napoleon’s army in a series of engagements during the spring campaign. The defeat of the Austrian army in Bavaria opened the road to Vienna, which fell to the French in following a four-day siege in May 1809. However, the bulk of the Austrian army had withdrawn north of the Danube, eluding the decisive victory Napoleon sought. Napoleon crossed the Danube on 22 May, and was confronted by the Austrian army, who hurled obstacles into the Danube that destroyed the French pontoons. When the French finally crossed the Danube, they fought the Austrians in the Battle of Aspern-Essling, which saw the Austrians victorious and the French driven back across the Danube.

Napoleon ordered Louis Nicholas Davout to seize the fortress of Pressburg. Earlier in the 1805, Pressburg was occupied by the French on 16 November without a fight in the wake of the rout of the Austrian army. Pressburg occupied an important strategic position on the Danube. The capture of Pressburg would have left Hungary vulnerable to the French army had it sought to extend its army into the region. Austrian commanders fortified the approaches to the city in anticipation of the French advance.

== Siege ==
The French arrived on 1 June 1809. French troops attempted to storm Pressburg. However, Austrian resistance was stiff and heavy fighting took place around the bridgehead between 1 and 4 June. By the end of the fighting, the only French progress to be made was the occupation of the city’s suburbs on the south of the Danube, namely Engerau (Petržalka). The French established artillery columns south of Pressburg as they prepared to shell the citadel.

The bombardment of Pressburg intensified towards the end of June 1809. French artillery shelled the city extensively, More than one hundred houses were believed to be destroyed and other structures were badly damaged, including sections of Bratislava Castle and parts of the old town. The shelling caused panic amongst the civilian population and many were displaced from suburbs that were particularly vulnerable to shelling.. Throughout a month of intense bombardment and street fighting, the French still found themselves unable to storm the city as Austrian and Hungarian armies maintained a stubborn defense.

The siege ended on the 12th of July after the battle of Znaim. Archduke Charles had sought a ceasefire as he believed the Austrian army was in an untenable situation after it had narrowly escaped complete destruction at the Battle of Wagram, which though the French won, Austria had fought with such tenacity that it had exhausted the French. Suffering very heavy casualties in days of fighting, the French army found itself unable to pursue the Austrians who retreated in good order cohesively and organized, this left both countries in a position where both would have wanted to accept a cessation to fighting, which occurred during the Battle of Znaim. This ended military operations in the area, and fighting for Pressburg stopped. Two days later, Pressburg opened its gates and was occupied by the French, who withdrew in late November 1809.
