= List of battles of the Hundred Days =

This is a list of sieges, land and naval battles of the Hundred Days or War of the Seventh Coalition (20 March – 8 July 1815, or 15 March – 10 September 1815, depending on periodisation). It includes:

- the Waterloo campaign (8 June – 8 July 1815);
- the Neapolitan War (15 March – 20 May 1815), plus the Siege of Gaeta (1815) (28 May – 8 August 1815);
- the minor campaigns of 1815 (18 June – 7 July 1815), plus the reduction of the French fortresses in 1815 (8 July – 10 September 1815); and
- the Invasion of Guadeloupe (1815) (8–10 August 1815).

Date	Battle	Front	French forces	Coalition forces	Notes
3 April 1815	Battle of the Panaro	Neapolitan	(Kingdom of Naples) Napoleonic Naples	Austrian Empire	Neapolitan victory
3–12 April 1815	Siege of Ferrara (1815)	Neapolitan	(Kingdom of Naples) Napoleonic Naples	Austrian Empire	Coalition victory
8–9 April 1815	Battle of Occhiobello	Neapolitan	(Kingdom of Naples) Napoleonic Naples	Austrian Empire	Coalition victory
20 April 1815	Battle of Carpi (1815)	Neapolitan	(Kingdom of Naples) Napoleonic Naples	Austrian Empire	Coalition victory
11 April 1815	Battle of Massa	Neapolitan	(Kingdom of Naples) Napoleonic Naples	Austrian Empire (Grand Duchy of Tuscany) Gr. D. of Tuscany	Coalition victory
12 April 1815	Battle of Casaglia	Neapolitan	(Kingdom of Naples) Napoleonic Naples	Austrian Empire	Coalition victory
21 April 1815	Battle of Ronco	Neapolitan	(Kingdom of Naples) Napoleonic Naples	Austrian Empire	Coalition victory
23 April 1815	Battle of Cesenatico	Neapolitan	(Kingdom of Naples) Napoleonic Naples	Austrian Empire	Coalition victory
28 April 1815	Battle of Pesaro	Neapolitan	(Kingdom of Naples) Napoleonic Naples	Austrian Empire	Coalition victory
1 May 1815	Battle of Scapezzano	Neapolitan	(Kingdom of Naples) Napoleonic Naples	Austrian Empire	Coalition victory
2–3 May 1815	Battle of Tolentino	Neapolitan	(Kingdom of Naples) Napoleonic Naples	Austrian Empire (Grand Duchy of Tuscany) Gr. D. of Tuscany	Coalition decisive victory Flight of Murat (Note: Murat fled from Naples on 19 May 1815, reaching Cannes in France on 25 May, and requesting Napoleon to join his army, but Napoleon refused. Murat fled to Corsica after hearing of Napoleon's defeat at Waterloo, and tried to rally support for another campaign for Naples by landing in Pizzo, Calabria on 8 October. But the population was hostile, captured him and handed him over to Ferdinand I of the Two Sicilies, who had Murat executed on 13 October 1815.)
5–30 May 1815	Siege of Ancona	Neapolitan	(Kingdom of Naples) Napoleonic Naples	Austrian Empire; United Kingdom	Coalition victory
13 May 1815	Battle of Castel di Sangro	Neapolitan	(Kingdom of Naples) Napoleonic Naples	Austrian Empire	Coalition victory
15 May – 17 May 1815	Battle of San Germano	Neapolitan	(Kingdom of Naples) Napoleonic Naples	Austrian Empire	Coalition victory
28 May – 8 August 1815	Siege of Gaeta (1815)	Neapolitan	(Kingdom of Naples) Napoleonic Naples	Austrian Empire; United Kingdom	Coalition victory
15 June 1815	Action at Gilly	Waterloo	First French Empire	Kingdom of Prussia	French victory
16 June 1815	Battle of Quatre Bras	Waterloo	First French Empire	United Kingdom (United Kingdom of the Netherlands) UK o/t Netherlands; Kingdom of Hanover; Duchy of Nassau; Duchy of Brunswick	Indecisive
16 June 1815	Battle of Ligny	Waterloo	First French Empire	Kingdom of Prussia	French key victory
17 June 1815	1st Action at Genappe	Waterloo	First French Empire	United Kingdom	French victory
18 June 1815	Battle of Waterloo	Waterloo	First French Empire	United Kingdom; Kingdom of Prussia (United Kingdom of the Netherlands) UK o/t Netherlands; Kingdom of Hanover; Duchy of Nassau; Duchy of Brunswick	Coalition decisive victory Abdication of Napoleon (Note: After a fighting withdrawal from Waterloo, Napoleon caved into external and internal pressures, and abdicated on 22 June 1815.)
18 June 1815	Battle of Wavre	Waterloo	First French Empire	Kingdom of Prussia	French tactical victory Coalition strategic victory
18 June 1815	2nd Action at Genappe	Waterloo	First French Empire	Kingdom of Prussia	Coalition victory
20 June 1815	Action at Namur	Waterloo	First French Empire	Kingdom of Prussia	Coalition victory
24–25 June 1815	Capture of Cambrai	Waterloo	First French Empire	United Kingdom	Coalition victory
28 June 1815	Battle of Villers-Cotterêts (1815)	Waterloo	First French Empire	Kingdom of Prussia	French victory
29 June 1815	Battle of Aubervilliers (1815)	Waterloo	First French Empire	Kingdom of Prussia	French victory
30 June 1815	Battle of Saint-Denis (1815)	Waterloo	First French Empire	Kingdom of Prussia	Coalition victory
1 July 1815	Battle of Rocquencourt	Waterloo	First French Empire	Kingdom of Prussia	French victory
2 July 1815	Battle of Sèvres	Waterloo	First French Empire	Kingdom of Prussia	Coalition victory
2–3 July 1815	Battle of Issy	Waterloo	First French Empire	Kingdom of Prussia	Coalition victory
20 June 1815	Battle of Rocheserviere	Minor 1815	First French Empire	Bourbon Restoration	Bonapartist victory
28 June 1815	Battle of La Suffel	Minor 1815	First French Empire	Austrian Empire (Kingdom of Württemberg) K. of Württemberg	French victory
8 July – 10 September 1815	Reduction of the French fortresses in 1815	Minor 1815	First French Empire	Seventh Coalition	Coalition victory
8–10 August 1815	Invasion of Guadeloupe (1815)	Minor 1815	First French Empire	United Kingdom; Bourbon Restoration	Coalition victory

== See also ==
- List of battles of the War of the First Coalition
- List of battles of the War of the Second Coalition
- List of battles of the War of the Third Coalition
- List of battles of the War of the Fourth Coalition
- List of battles of the War of the Fifth Coalition
- List of battles of the War of the Sixth Coalition
- List of battles of the French invasion of Russia
