= List of battles of the War of the Fifth Coalition =

This is a list of sieges, land and naval battles of the War of the Fifth Coalition (10 April – 14 October 1809).

Date	Battle	Front	French forces	Coalition forces	Notes
10 April – 14 October 1809	Austro-Polish War	Poland	Duchy of Warsaw; Kingdom of Saxony; Russian Empire	Austrian Empire	Polish victory
15–16 April 1809	Battle of Sacile	Italy	First French Empire; Napoleonic Italy	Austrian Empire	Coalition (Note: Mikaberidze (2020) states that the contributions of coalition members aside from Austria were "rather nominal". Englund (2004) writes that "the only real coalition to be mounted in this nominal fifth war of that name was the coalition France created against unhappy Austria; it included the key German States and Italy.") victory
19 April 1809	Battle of Teugen-Hausen	Bavaria	First French Empire; Kingdom of Bavaria	Austrian Empire	French victory
19 April 1809	Battle of Raszyn (1809)	Poland	Duchy of Warsaw; Kingdom of Saxony	Austrian Empire	Coalition victory
20 April 1809	Battle of Abensberg	Bavaria	First French Empire; Kingdom of Bavaria; Kingdom of Württemberg	Austrian Empire	French victory
21 April 1809	Battle of Landshut (1809)	Bavaria	First French Empire; Kingdom of Bavaria; Kingdom of Württemberg	Austrian Empire	French victory
22 April 1809	Battle of Eckmühl	Bavaria	First French Empire; Kingdom of Bavaria; Kingdom of Württemberg	Austrian Empire	French key victory
23 April 1809	Battle of Ratisbon	Regensburg	First French Empire	Austrian Empire	French victory
24 April 1809	Battle of Neumarkt-Sankt Veit	Bavaria	First French Empire; Kingdom of Bavaria	Austrian Empire	Coalition victory
25 April 1809	Battle of Radzymin (1809)	Poland	Duchy of Warsaw	Austrian Empire	French victory
27–30 April 1809	Battle of Caldiero (1809)	Italy	First French Empire; Napoleonic Italy	Austrian Empire	Coalition victory
26 April – 21 May 1809	Dalmatian Campaign (1809)	Dalmatia	First French Empire	Austrian Empire	French victory
3 May 1809	Battle of Ebelsberg	Austria	First French Empire	Austrian Empire	French victory
8 May 1809	Battle of Piave River (1809)	Italy	First French Empire; Napoleonic Italy	Austrian Empire	French victory
10-13 May 1809	Siege of Vienna (1809)	Austria	First French Empire	Austrian Empire	French victory
13 May 1809	Battle of Wörgl	Austria	First French Empire; Kingdom of Bavaria	Austrian Empire	French victory
13 May 1809	Battle of Schwarze Lackenau	Austria	First French Empire	Austrian Empire	Coalition victory
15–18 May 1809	Battle of Tarvis (1809)	Italy	First French Empire	Austrian Empire	French victory
17 May 1809	Battle of Linz-Urfahr	Austria	First French Empire; Kingdom of Saxony; Kingdom of Württemberg	Austrian Empire	French victory
21–22 May 1809	Battle of Aspern-Essling	Austria	First French Empire	Austrian Empire	Coalition key victory
25 May 1809	Battle of Sankt Michael	Austria	First French Empire	Austrian Empire	French victory
11–24 April 1809	Battle of the Basque Roads	Biscay	First French Empire	United Kingdom	Coalition victory
12 April – 1 November 1809	Battles of Bergisel	Tyrol	Kingdom of Bavaria; First French Empire	(Tyrol (federal state)) Tyrolean rebels Austrian Empire	French victory
1 June - 14 July 1809	Siege of Pressburg	Hungary	First French Empire	Austrian Empire; Hungary	Austrian & Hungarian victory
14 June 1809	Battle of Raab	Hungary	First French Empire; Napoleonic Italy	Austrian Empire; Hungary	French victory
24–26 June 1809	Battle of Graz	Austria	First French Empire	Austrian Empire	French victory
5–6 July 1809	Battle of Wagram	Austria	First French Empire; Kingdom of Bavaria; Kingdom of Saxony; Napoleonic Italy	Austrian Empire	French key victory
7 July 1809	Combat of Korneuburg	Austria	First French Empire	Austrian Empire	French victory
8 July 1809	Combat of Stockerau	Austria	First French Empire (Grand Duchy of Hesse) Gr. Duchy of Hesse	Austrian Empire	Coalition victory
8 July 1809	Battle of Gefrees	Bavaria	First French Empire; Kingdom of Westphalia; Kingdom of Saxony	Austrian Empire; Black Brunswickers	Coalition victory
9 July 1809	Battle of Hollabrunn (1809)	Austria	First French Empire	Austrian Empire	Coalition victory
10 July 1809	Combat of Schöngrabern	Austria	First French Empire	Austrian Empire	French victory
10–11 July 1809	Battle of Znaim	Moravia	First French Empire	Austrian Empire	Armistice of Znaim; Treaty of Schönbrunn
29–30 July 1809	Battle of Halberstadt	Westphalia	Kingdom of Westphalia	Black Brunswickers	Coalition victory
30 July – 23 December 1809	Walcheren Campaign	Holland	First French Empire (Netherlands) Kingdom of Holland	United Kingdom	French victory
1 August 1809	Battle of Ölper (1809)	Westphalia	Kingdom of Westphalia	Black Brunswickers	Indecisive
10 September – 18 October 1809	1809 Gottscheer rebellion	Gottschee	First French Empire	(Austrian Empire) Gottschee rebels	French victory

== See also ==
- List of battles of the War of the First Coalition
- List of battles of the War of the Second Coalition
- List of battles of the War of the Third Coalition
- List of battles of the War of the Fourth Coalition
- List of battles of the War of the Sixth Coalition
- List of battles of the Hundred Days (War of the Seventh Coalition)

== Sources ==
- Englund, Steven (2004). Napoleon : a Political Life. New York: Scribner. ISBN 978-0-684-87142-4. OCLC 1085212315.
- Mikaberidze, Alexander (2020). The Napoleonic Wars: A Global History. Oxford: Oxford University Press. ISBN 978-0-19-995106-2.
