= List of battles of the War of the Second Coalition =

This is a list of sieges, land and naval battles of the War of the Second Coalition (1798/9 – 1801/2, depending on periodisation). It includes the battles of:

- the French campaign in Egypt and Syria (July 1799 – September 1801);
- the Naples campaign in central and southern Italy (November 1798 – January 1799);
- the Sanfedisti campaign in central and southern Italy (February–June 1799);
- the Austro-Russian expedition in Italy and Switzerland (April–December 1799);
- the Anglo-Russian invasion of Holland (August–November 1799);
- the Marengo campaign in northern Italy (April–June 1800);
- the Danube campaign in southern Germany (May–June 1800);
- the Hohenlinden campaign in Bavaria (November–December 1800);
- the War of the Oranges in Portugal (May–June 1801);
- overseas naval or colonial territories (insofar these were not part of the Haitian Revolution or East Indies theatre);
- insurrections in Paris that overtook or threatened to overtake the central government.

It does not include battles from the Haitian Revolution (1791–1804), nor the East Indies theatre of the French Revolutionary Wars (1793–1801), nor the Chouannerie (1794–1800), nor the Anglo-Spanish War (1796–1808) (including the 1801 Algeciras campaign), nor the French invasion of Switzerland (January–May 1798), nor the Irish Rebellion of 1798, nor Mediterranean campaign of 1798, nor the Peasants' War (1798), nor the Quasi-War (1798–1800), nor the Stecklikrieg (1802), as these did not involve the Second Coalition as such.

Date	Battle	Front	French forces	Coalition forces	Notes
13 July 1798	Battle of Shubra Khit (Battle of Chobrakit)	Egypt and Syria	French First Republic	Ottoman Empire • Mamluks	French victory
21 July 1798	Battle of the Pyramids (Battle of Embabeh)	Egypt and Syria	French First Republic	Ottoman Empire • Mamluks	French victory
1–3 August 1798	Battle of the Nile (Battle of Aboukir Bay)	Egypt and Syria	French First Republic	Great Britain	British (Note: At this time, the British and Ottomans were co-belligents; no formal alliance would be concluded until December 1798. The Battle of the Nile may be considered part of both the Mediterranean campaign of 1798 and the French campaign in Egypt and Syria.) key victory
11 August 1798	Battle of Salahieh	Egypt and Syria	French First Republic	Ottoman Empire • Mamluks	French victory
12 / 23 October 1798	Battle of Nicopolis (Battle of Preveza)	Greece	French First Republic	Ottoman Empire	Ottoman victory
21–22 October 1798	Revolt of Cairo	Egypt and Syria	French First Republic	Cairene rebels	French victory
4 November 1798 – 3 March 1799	Siege of Corfu	Greece	French First Republic	Russian Empire; Ottoman Empire	Coalition (Note: Russia and the Ottoman Empire concluded an alliance in December 1798.) victory
29 November 1798	Capture of Rome	Italy; Naples	French First Republic; Roman Republic	Kingdom of Naples	Neapolitan (Note: Although a formal alliance between Austria and Naples had been concluded on 19 May 1798, and Austrian general Karl Mack von Leiberich commanded the Neapolitan troops, there were no Austrian troops and formally no Austrian involvement in this campaign. France did declare war on Naples on 6 December 1798, but would not declare war on Austria until 12 March 1799.) victory
5 December 1798	Battle of Civita Castellana	Italy; Naples	French First Republic	Kingdom of Naples	French victory
9 December 1798	Capture of Turin	Italy	French First Republic	Kingdom of Sardinia	French victory Piedm. Republic proclaimed (Note: Following the refusal to enter in alliance against the Two Sicilies, France declared war on both Naples and Piedmont-Sardinia the same day, 6 December 1798. The Piedmontese Republic was proclaimed on 10 December 1798. The Sardinian king Charles Emmanuel IV fled to Cagliari.)
23 January 1799	Capture of Naples	Italy; Naples	French First Republic	Kingdom of Naples	French victory Parth. Republic proclaimed
8–20 February 1799	Siege of El Arish	Egypt and Syria	French First Republic	Ottoman Empire • Mamluks	French victory
3 March 1799	Battle of Qena	Egypt and Syria	French First Republic	Ottoman Empire	Ottoman victory
3–7 March 1799	Siege of Jaffa	Egypt and Syria	French First Republic	Ottoman Empire	French victory
6 March 1799	Battle of Chur	Italian and Swiss	French First Republic	Habsburg Monarchy	French victory
7 March 1799	(First) Battle of Feldkirch	Italian and Swiss	French First Republic	Habsburg Monarchy	French victory
20–21 March 1799	Battle of Ostrach	Germany	French First Republic	Habsburg Monarchy	Coalition victory
20 March – 21 May 1799	Siege of Acre	Egypt and Syria	French First Republic	Ottoman Empire; Great Britain	Coalition key victory
23 March 1799	(Second) Battle of Feldkirch	Italian and Swiss	French First Republic	Habsburg Monarchy	Coalition victory
25 March 1799	Battle of Stockach	Germany	French First Republic	Habsburg Monarchy	Coalition victory
29 March 1799	Battle of Verona	Italian and Swiss	French First Republic	Habsburg Monarchy	Draw
5 April 1799	Battle of Magnano	Italy	French First Republic	Habsburg Monarchy	Coalition victory
April–July 1799	Siege of Mantua	Italy	French First Republic	Habsburg Monarchy	Coalition victory
16 April 1799	Battle of Mount Tabor	Egypt and Syria	French First Republic	Ottoman Empire	French victory
27–28 April 1799	Battle of Cassano	Italian and Swiss	French First Republic	Russian Empire; Habsburg Monarchy	Coalition victory
12 May 1799	Battle of Bassignana	Italian and Swiss	French First Republic	Russian Empire; Habsburg Monarchy	French victory
16 May 1799	First Battle of Marengo (Battle of San Giuliano)	Italian and Swiss	French First Republic	Habsburg Monarchy; Russian Empire	Coalition victory
25 May 1799	Battle of Frauenfeld	Italian and Swiss	French First Republic; Helvetic Republic	Habsburg Monarchy	Draw
27 May 1799	Battle of Winterthur	Italian and Swiss	French First Republic	Habsburg Monarchy	Coalition victory
4–7 June 1799	First Battle of Zurich	Italian and Swiss	French First Republic	Habsburg Monarchy	Coalition victory
12 June 1799	Battle of Modena	Italian and Swiss	French First Republic	Habsburg Monarchy	French victory
?–19 June 1799	Siege of Naples	Italy; Sanfedisti	French First Republic; Parthenopean Republic	(Kingdom of Naples) Sanfedisti; Great Britain	Coalition victory Kingdom of Naples restored
18 June 1799	Coup of 30 Prairial VII	Paris	(French First Republic) Anti-Jacobins	(French First Republic) Neo-Jacobins	Anti-Jacobin victory Sieyès seizes power
17–20 June 1799	Battle of Trebbia	Italian and Swiss	French First Republic with Polish Legions	Russian Empire; Habsburg Monarchy	Coalition victory
20 June 1799	Second Battle of Marengo (Battle of Cascina Grossa)	Italian and Swiss	French First Republic	Habsburg Monarchy	French victory
25 July 1799	Battle of Abukir (1) (Aboukir / Abu Qir)	Egypt and Syria	French First Republic	Ottoman Empire * Mamluks	French victory
14–15 August 1799	Battle of Schwyz	Italian and Swiss	French First Republic	Habsburg Monarchy	French victory
14–16 August 1799	Battle of Amsteg	Italian and Swiss	French First Republic	Habsburg Monarchy	French victory
15 August 1799	(First) Battle of Novi	Italian and Swiss	French First Republic	Russian Empire; Habsburg Monarchy	Coalition victory
27 August 1799	Battle of Callantsoog (Battle of Groote Keeten)	Holland	Batavian Republic	Great Britain	Coalition victory
30 August 1799	Vlieter incident	Holland	Batavian Republic	Great Britain	Coalition victory
10 September 1799	Battle of Krabbendam (Battle of Zijpedijk)	Holland	French First Republic; Batavian Republic	Great Britain	Coalition victory
18 September 1799	Battle of Mannheim	Italian and Swiss	French First Republic	Habsburg Monarchy	Coalition victory
19 September 1799	Battle of Bergen (1799) (Battle of Bergen-Binnen)	Holland	French First Republic; Batavian Republic	Great Britain; Russian Empire	French victory
24 September 1799	Battle of Gotthard Pass	Italian and Swiss	French First Republic	Russian Empire; Habsburg Monarchy	Coalition victory
25–26 September 1799	Second Battle of Zurich	Italian and Swiss	French First Republic	Russian Empire; Habsburg Monarchy	French key victory
25–26 September 1799	Battle of Linth River	Italian and Swiss	French First Republic	Russian Empire; Habsburg Monarchy * Swiss rebels	French victory
30 September – 1 October 1799	Battle of Muottental	Italian and Swiss	French First Republic	Russian Empire	Coalition victory
1 October 1799	Battle of Näfels (1799)	Italian and Swiss	French First Republic; Helvetic Republic	Russian Empire; Habsburg Monarchy	Inconclusive
6 October 1799	Battle of Castricum	Holland	French First Republic; Batavian Republic	Great Britain; Russian Empire * Prince of Orange	French key victory
24 October 1799	Second Battle of Novi (Battle of Bosco)	Italian and Swiss	French First Republic * Polish Legions	Habsburg Monarchy	French victory
4 November 1799	Battle of Genola (Battle of Fossano)	Italian and Swiss	French First Republic	Habsburg Monarchy	Coalition victory
9 November 1799	Coup of 18 Brumaire	Paris	(French First Republic) Napoleon & allies	(French First Republic) French Directory	Napoleonic key victory Consulate proclaimed
3 December 1799	Battle of Wiesloch	Italian and Swiss	French First Republic	Habsburg Monarchy	Coalition victory
20 March 1800	Battle of Heliopolis	Egypt and Syria	French First Republic	Ottoman Empire * Mamluks; Great Britain	French victory
6 April – 4 June 1800	Siege of Genoa	Italy; Marengo	French First Republic	Habsburg Monarchy; Great Britain	Coalition victory
10 April 1800	Battle of Sassello	Italy; Marengo	French First Republic	Habsburg Monarchy	Coalition victory
1 May 1800	Battle of Büsingen	Germany; Danube	French First Republic	Habsburg Monarchy	French victory
3 May 1800	Battles of Stockach and Engen	Germany; Danube	French First Republic	Habsburg Monarchy	French victory
4–5 May 1800	Battle of Messkirch	Germany; Danube	French First Republic	Habsburg Monarchy	French victory
9 May 1800	Battle of Biberach	Germany; Danube	French First Republic	Habsburg Monarchy	French victory
14 May – 1 June 1800	Siege of Fort Bard	Italy; Marengo	French First Republic	Habsburg Monarchy; Kingdom of Sardinia	French victory
26 May 1800	Battle of Chiusella River	Italy Marengo	French First Republic	Habsburg Monarchy	French victory
31 May 1800	Combat of Turbigo	Italy; Marengo	French First Republic	Habsburg Monarchy	French victory
9 June 1800	Battle of Montebello	Italy; Marengo	French First Republic	Habsburg Monarchy	French victory
14 June 1800	Battle of Marengo	Italy; Marengo	French First Republic	Habsburg Monarchy	French key victory (Note: The following day, the Convention of Alessandria was signed: a truce between France and Austria that would last from 15 June until 22 November 1800.)
19 June 1800	Battle of Höchstädt	Germany; Danube	French First Republic	Habsburg Monarchy	French victory
27 June 1800	Battle of Neuburg	Germany; Danube	French First Republic	Habsburg Monarchy	French victory
1 December 1800	Battle of Ampfing	Germany; Hohenlinden	French First Republic	Habsburg Monarchy	Coalition pyrrhic victory
3 December 1800	Battle of Hohenlinden	Germany; Hohenlinden	French First Republic	Habsburg Monarchy; Electorate of Bavaria	French key victory
25–26 December 1800	Battle of Pozzolo (Mincio River / Monzambano)	Italy	French First Republic	Habsburg Monarchy	French victory
8 March 1801	Battle of Abukir (2)	Egypt and Syria	French First Republic	Great Britain	Coalition tactical victory
13 March 1801	Battle of Mandora	Egypt and Syria	French First Republic	Great Britain	Coalition victory
21 March 1801	Battle of Alexandria (Battle of Canope)	Egypt and Syria	French First Republic	Great Britain	Coalition victory
2 April 1801	Battle of Copenhagen	Denmark	Denmark–Norway	United Kingdom	Coalition victory
8–19 April 1801	Siege of Fort Julien	Egypt and Syria	French First Republic	United Kingdom; Ottoman Empire	Coalition victory
May–June 1801	Siege of Cairo	Egypt and Syria	French First Republic	United Kingdom; Ottoman Empire	Coalition victory
17 August – 2 September 1801	Siege of Alexandria	Egypt and Syria	French First Republic	United Kingdom	Coalition (Note: At this time, the British and Ottomans were still allies fighting against France (since December 1798), even though most other members of the Second Coalition had already signed separate peace treaties. The alliance would be suspended by the Franco–Ottoman truce of Paris (9 October 1801), come to an end by the Anglo-French Treaty of Amiens (25 March 1802), and the war would be formally concluded by the Franco–Ottoman Treaty of Paris (25 June 1802).) victory

== See also ==
- List of battles of the War of the First Coalition (20 April 1792 – 18 October 1797)
- List of battles of the War of the Third Coalition (1803/1805–1805/1806)
- List of battles of the War of the Fourth Coalition (9 October 1806 – 9 July 1807)
- List of battles of the War of the Fifth Coalition (10 April – 14 October 1809)
- List of battles of the War of the Sixth Coalition (3 March 1813 – 30 May 1814)
- List of battles of the Hundred Days (War of the Seventh Coalition) (15/20 March – 8 July / 16 August 1815)
