= List of battles of the War of the Fourth Coalition =

War of the Fourth Coalition
⬤ Napoleon not in command
⬤ Napoleon in command

This is a list of sieges, land and naval battles of the War of the Fourth Coalition (9 October 1806 – 9 July 1807). It can be divided into several campaigns:

- the Jena campaign in modern-day Thuringia (9–14 October 1806);
- the post-Jena or Prenzlau-Lübeck campaign in Brandenburg and Pomerania (October–November 1806); various sieges resulting from this offensive continued until August 1807;
- the Eylau campaign in the eastern provinces of Prussia (23 December 1806 – 8 February 1807);
- the Friedland campaign in the eastern provinces of Prussia (16 February 1807 – 14 June 1807).

Some battles overlapped with the Franco-Swedish War. Excluded is the Gunboat War.

Date	Battle	Front	French forces	Coalition forces	Notes
9 October 1806	Battle of Schleiz	Thuringia; Jena	First French Empire	Kingdom of Prussia; Electorate of Saxony	French victory
10 October 1806	Battle of Saalfeld	Thuringia; Jena	First French Empire	Kingdom of Prussia; Electorate of Saxony	French victory
14 October 1806	Battle of Jena–Auerstedt	Thuringia; Jena	First French Empire	Kingdom of Prussia; Electorate of Saxony	French key victory
16 October 1806	Capitulation of Erfurt	Thuringia; Post-Jena	First French Empire	Kingdom of Prussia	French victory
17 October 1806	Battle of Halle	Brandenburg; Post-Jena	First French Empire	Kingdom of Prussia	French victory
25 October – 8 November 1806	Siege of Magdeburg (1806)	Brandenburg; Post-Jena	First French Empire	Kingdom of Prussia	French victory
27 October 1806	Fall of Berlin (1806)	Brandenburg; Post-Jena	First French Empire	Kingdom of Prussia	French victory
28 October 1806	Battle of Prenzlau	Brandenburg; Post-Jena	First French Empire	Kingdom of Prussia	French victory
29 October 1806	Capitulation of Pasewalk	Pr. Pomerania; Post-Jena	First French Empire	Kingdom of Prussia	French victory
29–30 October 1806	Capitulation of Stettin	Pr. Pomerania; Post-Jena	First French Empire	Kingdom of Prussia	French victory
1 November 1806	Battle of Waren-Nossentin	Meckl.-Schwerin; Post-Jena	First French Empire	Kingdom of Prussia	Coalition victory
3 November – 3 December 1806	Greater Poland uprising (1806)	South Prussia; Post-Jena	First French Empire (Duchy of Warsaw) Polish rebels	Kingdom of Prussia	French victory
6 November 1806	Battle of Lübeck	Free Lübeck; Post-Jena	First French Empire Denmark–Norway	Kingdom of Prussia; Kingdom of Sweden Free City of Lübeck	French victory
7–22 November 1806	Siege of Hamelin	Hanover; Post-Jena	First French Empire (Netherlands) Kingdom of Holland	Kingdom of Prussia	French victory
23 December 1806	Battle of Czarnowo	New East Prussia; Eylau	First French Empire	Russian Empire; Kingdom of Prussia	French victory
26 December 1806	Battle of Pułtusk (1806)	New East Prussia; Eylau	First French Empire; Kingdom of Bavaria	Russian Empire; Kingdom of Prussia	French victory
26 December 1806	Battle of Golymin	New East Prussia; Eylau	First French Empire	Russian Empire	French victory
22 January – 11 December 1807	Siege of Graudenz	West Prussia; Eylau	First French Empire (Grand Duchy of Hesse) Gr. Duchy of Hesse; Electorate of Saxony	Kingdom of Prussia	Coalition victory
25 January 1807	Battle of Mohrungen	East Prussia; Eylau	First French Empire	Russian Empire; Kingdom of Prussia	French victory
3 February 1807	Battle of Allenstein	East Prussia; Eylau	First French Empire	Russian Empire	French victory
7–8 February 1807	Battle of Eylau	Pr. Pomerania; Eylau	First French Empire	Russian Empire; Kingdom of Prussia	Indecisive
16 February 1807	Battle of Ostrołęka (1807)	New East Prussia; Friedland	First French Empire	Russian Empire	French victory
19 February 1807	Conquest of Stolp	Pr. Pomerania; Friedland	(Duchy of Warsaw) Polish rebels	Kingdom of Prussia	French victory
19 March – 24 May 1807	Siege of Danzig (1807)	West Prussia; Friedland	First French Empire; Kingdom of Saxony; Polish Legions; Napoleonic Italy (Grand Duchy of Baden) Gr. Duchy of Baden	Kingdom of Prussia; Russian Empire; United Kingdom	French victory
20 March – 2 July 1807	Siege of Kolberg (1807)	Pr. Pomerania; Friedland	First French Empire: (Duchy of Warsaw) Polish rebels; Napoleonic Italy; (Netherlands) Kingdom of Holland; Duchy of Nassau; Saxe-Gotha-Alt.; Saxe-Meiningen; Saxe-Weimar; Saxe-Coburg-Saalfeld; Saxe-Hildburghausen; (Kingdom of Württemberg) Württemberg	Kingdom of Prussia; Naval support: Kingdom of Sweden; United Kingdom	Indecisive
1–3 April 1807	Great Sortie of Stralsund	Sw. Pomerania; Friedland	First French Empire (Netherlands) Kingdom of Holland	Kingdom of Sweden	Coalition victory
16 April 1807	Battle of Belling	Sw. Pomerania; Friedland	First French Empire	Kingdom of Sweden	French victory
5–6 June 1807	Battle of Guttstadt-Deppen	East Prussia; Friedland	First French Empire	Russian Empire; Kingdom of Prussia	Coalition tactical victory French strategic victory
10 June 1807	Battle of Heilsberg	East Prussia; Friedland	First French Empire	Russian Empire; Kingdom of Prussia	Indecisive
14 June 1807	Battle of Friedland	East Prussia; Friedland	First French Empire; Kingdom of Saxony	Russian Empire	French key victory Treaties of Tilsit
24 July – 24 August 1807	Siege of Stralsund (1807)	Sw. Pomerania; Friedland	First French Empire	Kingdom of Sweden	French key victory Sw. Pomerania French

== See also ==
- List of battles of the War of the First Coalition
- List of battles of the War of the Second Coalition
- List of battles of the War of the Third Coalition
- List of battles of the War of the Fifth Coalition
- List of battles of the War of the Sixth Coalition
- List of battles of the Hundred Days (War of the Seventh Coalition)

== Sources ==
- Burgdorf, Wolfgang (2006). Ein Weltbild verliert seine Welt (in German). Oldenbourg. ISBN 978-3-486-58110-2.
- Erkenbrecher, Hans, ed. (1998). Die Residenzstadt Gotha in der Goethe-Zeit. Palmbaum Texte: Kulturgeschichte. Vol. 5.
- Lilienstern, Helga Rühle von (2008). Das grosse Geheimnis von Hildburghausen (in German). Salier Verlag. ISBN 978-3-939611-19-6.
- Wörner, Nadine (2004). Süddeutschland in den Revolutions- und napoleonischen Kriegen (in German). GRIN Verlag. ISBN 978-3-640-28651-5.
