= List of battles of the War of the Third Coalition =

This is a list of sieges, land and naval battles of the War of the Third Coalition (18 May 1803 / 25 September 1805 – 26 December 1805 / 18 July 1806, depending on periodisation). It includes:

- the Trafalgar campaign (March–November 1805);
- the Ulm campaign (25 September – 20 October 1805);
- the Venetian campaign in modern-day Veneto (October–November 1805);
- the Austerlitz campaign in modern-day Austria and Czechia (30 October – 2 December 1805);
- the Hanover Expedition or Weser Expedition (19 November 1805 – 15 February 1806);
- the Invasion of Naples (1806) (8 February – 18 July 1806), with the Battle of Mileto (28 May 1807) as a last reprise.
- It also includes the British conquest of the Dutch Cape Colony (in modern-day South Africa) and Dutch Surinam from the French-aligned Batavian Republic, and some naval engagements between British and French(-Spanish/-Batavian) forces in the Caribbean and the English Channel.

Date	Battle	Front	French forces	Coalition forces	Notes
5 May 1804	Battle of Suriname	Caribbean	Batavian Republic; French First Republic	United Kingdom	British victory (Note: The Third Coalition was not established until April–September 1805; before then, the United Kingdom of Great Britain and Ireland fought the French First Republic and its allies on its own.)
31 May – 2 June 1805	Battle of Diamond Rock	Caribbean; Trafalgar	First French Empire (Note: The French First Republic transformed into the First French Empire by the Constitution of 18 May 1804; the Coronation of Napoleon (a formality) would follow on 2 December 1804.); Bourbon Spain	United Kingdom	French victory
15 July 1805	Action of 15 July 1805	Channel	First French Empire	United Kingdom	French victory
18 July 1805	Battle of Blanc-Nez and Gris-Nez	Channel	Batavian Republic; First French Empire	United Kingdom	French victory
22 July 1805	Battle of Cape Finisterre (1805)	Atlantic; Trafalgar	First French Empire; Bourbon Spain	United Kingdom	Inconclusive
10 August 1805	Action of 10 August 1805	Atlantic; Trafalgar	First French Empire	United Kingdom	Coalition victory
7 October 1805	Battle of Donauwörth	Germany; Ulm	First French Empire	Austrian Empire (Note: The Austrian Empire was proclaimed on 11 August 1804 by Francis II (who inherited the Archduchy of Austria and thereby the Habsburg monarchy on 1 March 1792, and was elected Holy Roman Emperor on 5 July 1792), who thereby also assumed the hereditary title of Austrian Emperor tied to the House of Habsburg. On 6 August 1806, Francis II abdicated as Holy Roman Emperor and effectively dissolved the Holy Roman Empire. In the meantime, the Imperial and Royal Army was officially still the Army of the Holy Roman Empire (not to be confused with the Imperial Army (Holy Roman Empire)), but in practice consisted entirely of Habsburg troops in the service of the Austria Empire.)	French victory
8 October 1805	Battle of Wertingen	Germany; Ulm	First French Empire	Austrian Empire	French victory
9 October 1805	Battle of Günzburg	Germany; Ulm	First French Empire	Austrian Empire	French victory
11 October 1805	Battle of Haslach-Jungingen	Germany; Ulm	First French Empire	Austrian Empire	French victory
14 October 1805	Battle of Memmingen	Germany; Ulm	First French Empire	Austrian Empire	French victory
14 October 1805	Battle of Elchingen	Germany; Ulm	First French Empire	Austrian Empire	French victory
16–19 October 1805	Battle of Ulm	Germany; Ulm	First French Empire	Austrian Empire	French key victory
18 October 1805	Battle of Verona (1805)	Italy; Venice	First French Empire	Austrian Empire	French victory
21 October 1805	Battle of Trafalgar	Atlantic; Trafalgar	First French Empire; Bourbon Spain	United Kingdom	Coalition key victory
30 October 1805	Battle of Caldiero (1805)	Italy; Venice	First French Empire	Austrian Empire	French victory
30 October 1805	Battle of Mehrnbach	Austria; Austerlitz	First French Empire	Austrian Empire; Russian Empire	French victory
31 October 1805	Battle of Lambach	Austria; Austerlitz	First French Empire	Austrian Empire; Russian Empire	French victory
4 November 1805	Battle of Cape Ortegal	Atlantic; Trafalgar	First French Empire	United Kingdom	Coalition victory
5 November 1805	Battle of Amstetten	Austria; Austerlitz	First French Empire	Austrian Empire; Russian Empire	Inconclusive
8 November 1805	Battle of Mariazell	Austria; Austerlitz	First French Empire	Austrian Empire	French victory
11 November 1805	Battle of Dürenstein	Austria; Austerlitz	First French Empire	Russian Empire; Austrian Empire	Inconclusive
13 November 1805	Capitulation of Dornbirn	Austria; Austerlitz	First French Empire	Austrian Empire	French victory
16 November 1805	Battle of Schöngrabern	Austria; Austerlitz	First French Empire	Russian Empire	French victory
19 November 1805 – 15 February 1806	Hanover Expedition	Germany; Weser	First French Empire Kingdom of Prussia	United Kingdom; Russian Empire; Sweden	French victory Prussia occupies Hanover
24 November 1805	Battle of Castelfranco Veneto	Italy; Venice	First French Empire	Austrian Empire	French victory
25 November 1805	Battle of Wischau	Czechia; Austerlitz	First French Empire	Russian Empire	Coalition victory
2 December 1805	Battle of Austerlitz	Czechia; Austerlitz	First French Empire	Austrian Empire (Note: Russian general Kutuzov was in overall command of the Coalition forces at Austerlitz, but the c. 60,000 Austrian troops outnumbered the c. 15,000 Russian troops.); Russian Empire	French key victory
8 January 1806	Battle of Blaauwberg	S. Africa; Cape	Batavian Republic	United Kingdom	Coalition victory
8 February – 18 July 1806	Invasion of Naples (1806)	Italy; Naples	First French Empire (Kingdom of Italy (Napoleonic)) Kingdom of Italy	Kingdom of Naples; United Kingdom; Russian Empire	French victory
26 February – 18 July 1806	Siege of Gaeta (1806)	Italy; Naples	First French Empire: (Kingdom of Italy (Napoleonic)) Italy; Polish Legions; Switzerland	Kingdom of Naples	French key victory
9 March 1806	Battle of Campo Tenese	Italy; Naples	First French Empire: Polish Legions; Switzerland	Kingdom of Naples	French victory
4 July 1806	Battle of Maida	Italy; Naples	First French Empire: 2 Polish battalions; (Switzerland) 1 Swiss battalion	United Kingdom: Royal Corsicans; Royal Sicilians	Coalition victory
28 May 1807	Battle of Mileto	Italy; Naples	First French Empire	Kingdom of Sicily	French victory

== See also ==
- Anglo-Russian occupation of Naples (summer 1805 – January 1806)
- List of battles of the War of the First Coalition
- List of battles of the War of the Second Coalition
- List of battles of the War of the Fourth Coalition
- List of battles of the War of the Fifth Coalition
- List of battles of the War of the Sixth Coalition
- List of battles of the Hundred Days (War of the Seventh Coalition)
- Napoleon's planned invasion of the United Kingdom (planned from 1803 to 1805, but never carried out)
