= Battle of Castel di Sangro =

1815 battle during the Neapolitan War

- Part of the Neapolitan War
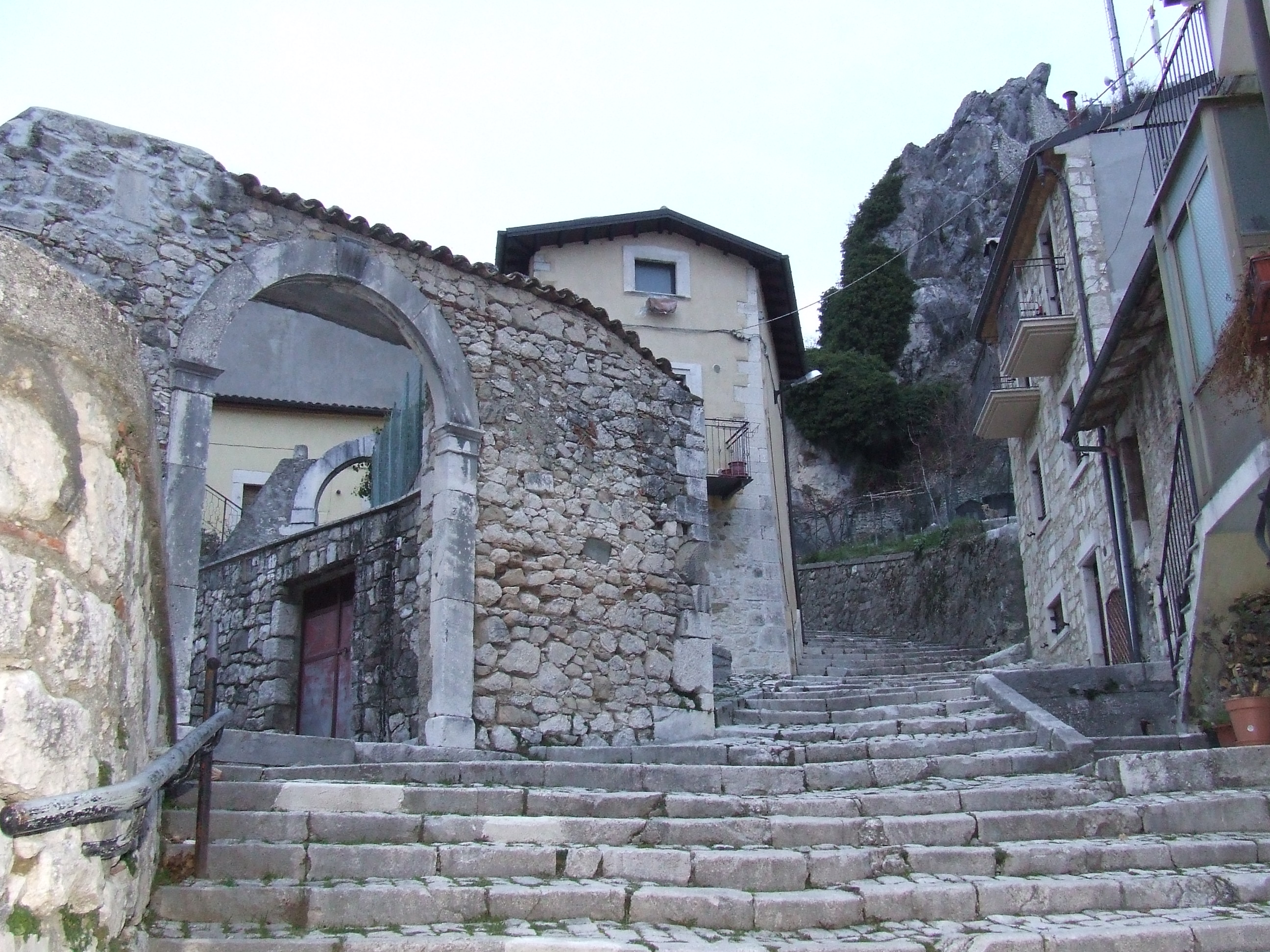
- Castel di Sangro - scorcio del centro storico
Date	13 May 1815
Location	Castel di Sangro, present-day Italy 41°47′0.69″N 14°6′26.15″E
Result	Austrian victory

Belligerents
Austrian Empire	Kingdom of Naples

Commanders and leaders
(Austrian Empire) General Starhemberg	(Kingdom of Naples) General Neri

Strength
1,000 infantry 1,000 cavalry	2,000 infantry

Casualties and losses
15 killed or wounded	400 killed or wounded 206 captured
- Location within Europe

The Battle of Castel di Sangro was a minor battle in the Neapolitan War that took place on 13 May 1815 in the town of Castel di Sangro in central Italy. The battle resulted in the Neapolitan force being routed.

Following defeat at the Battle of Tolentino, the 4th Division of the Neapolitan army, commanded by General Andrea Pignatelli di Cerchiara had detached from the main army under their king, Joachim Murat, and were retreating south. The commander of the Austrian force, Frederick Bianchi, dispatched his advanced guard, consisting of Hungarian hussars and Tyrolean jägers, in pursuit.

The Austrians finally caught up with the Neapolitans on 13 May in the town of Castel di Sangro. Seeing the hussars, the Neapolitans formed squares. However, during the cause of the disastrous campaign, the 4th Division had been reduced to less than 2,000 men. The hussars broke the Neapolitan square and sent the remaining troops into disarray.

== Citations ==
Preceded by Siege of Ancona	Napoleonic Wars; Battle of Castel di Sangro	Succeeded by Battle of San Germano
