= Siege of Antwerp (1814) =

Battle during the War of the Sixth Coalition

- Part of the War of the Sixth Coalition
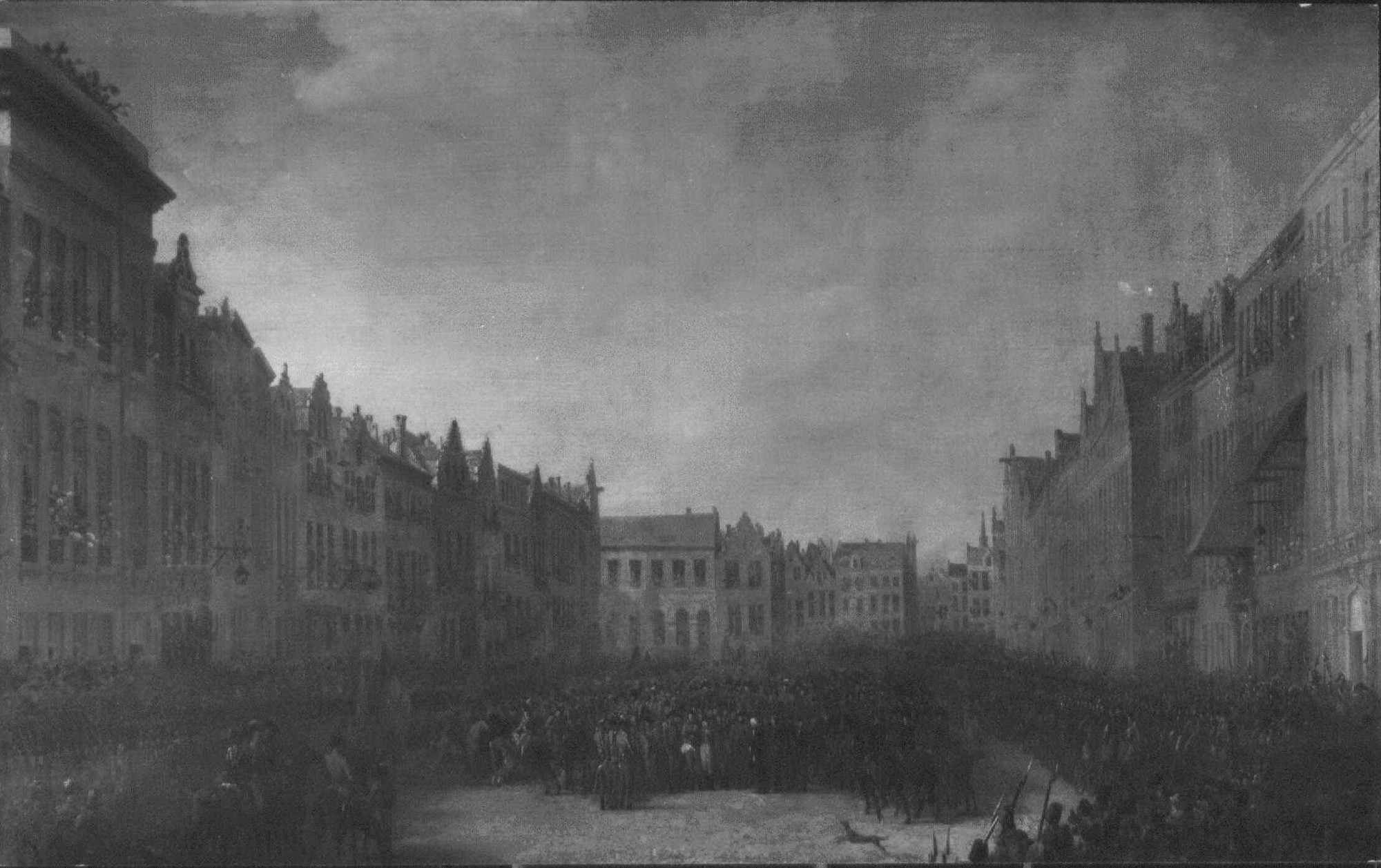
- The Allies Taking Possession of Antwerp in 1814 by Mathieu Ignace van Brée, c. 1814-1820
Date	14 January – 4 May 1814 (3 months, 2 weeks and 6 days)
Location	Antwerp, Deux-Nèthes, France (now Belgium) 51°13′04″N 04°24′01″E
Result	Inconclusive

Belligerents
France	United Kingdom; Prussia; Sweden; Russia

Commanders and leaders
(First French Empire) Lazare Carnot	(United Kingdom of Great Britain and Ireland) Thomas Graham (Kingdom of Prussia) Friedrich von Bülow

Strength
10,000	Jan–Feb: 8,000; Mar–May: 5,000

Casualties and losses
Unknown	Unknown

War of the Sixth Coalition:
Campaign Low Countries 1814
The color black indicates the current battle.

The siege of Antwerp took place from 14 January 1814 to 4 May 1814, during the War of the Sixth Coalition. Led by Governor Lazare Carnot, Antwerp, then a French city, resisted an Allied siege until Napoleon's abdication and the signing of an armistice.

== Background ==
After the German campaign of 1813, Napoleon had to retreat back across the Rhine as Coalition forces invaded the French Empire. Whereas the two armies of Blücher and Schwarzenberg marched on Paris, a third allied army under Bernadotte crossed into the Low Countries.

== Preliminaries ==
=== Naval operations ===
Antwerp remained a major base for the French Imperial Navy: from 1804 to 1814, its shipyards launched 19 ships of the line and frigates, and 14 were under construction at the start of the siege. The fortifications that blocked the mouths of the Scheldt, the Meuse and the Rhine had been reinforced since Britain's Walcheren campaign of 1809. However, the Antwerp squadron, commanded by Admiral Missiessy, was hardly in a position to compete with the Royal Navy for the exit of the Scheldt delta. In late 1813, seven ships had to be disarmed due to a shortage of sailors, including those crewed by Danish sailors. In the territory of the former Kingdom of Holland, annexed by France in 1810, Dutch civilians began to revolt and raise the flag of the Prince of Orange. In November, a French flotilla of five gunboats, commanded by Captain Halgan, was tasked with reinforcing the defences of Walcheren: the inhabitants of Hellevoetsluis had sabotaged the guns and made them unusable by spiking them. Halgan had the ramparts armed with the gunboats' guns and the enemy squadron, which was ready to enter the estuary, withdrew at the first salvo. In December, 2,555 sailors had landed to reinforce the garrisons of Antwerp, Bergen op Zoom and Vlissingen, with only 945 remaining with the squadron, which was practically immobilised until the end of the siege.

=== Land operations ===
The departments of the French Empire in the Low Countries, 1811. Antwerp (French: Anvers) was the capital of Deux-Nèthes.

On 21 December 1813, General Nicolas Joseph Maison was appointed commander of the I Corps of the Grande armée with the mission of defending the Rhine and Meuse crossings and the approaches to Antwerp. The Lefebvre-Desnouettes and Molitor divisions were to join him to block the advance of the British forces of General Graham and the Prussian forces of Bülow, which were soon to be joined by the Russian forces of Wintzingerode and the Dutch forces of the Prince of Orange. North of Antwerp, the French still held Nijmegen, 's-Hertogenbosch, Gorkum, Vlissingen and Berg-op-Zoom, as well as the islands of Texel and Walcheren: the British agreed to besiege all these places save for Gorkum. In early January 1814, Bülow assembled his forces to enter Belgium but, on 9 January, learned that the ice had damaged the bridges set up over the Rhine and the Meuse: he feared being attacked from the flank by Marshal Macdonald, who was operating around Grave in North Brabant, while Wintzingerode's corps was not in a position to join him. Bülow decided to take the offensive against Maison's corps: after the Battle of Hoogstraten on 11 January, Maison, threatened with encirclement by the Prussians and British, retreated south, mistakenly believing that the enemy forces were heading towards Leuven. On 13 January, Bülow attacked towards Wijnegem, in the suburbs of Antwerp, but was repelled. Meanwhile, the crossing of the Rhine by Chernyshyov's Russian army separated the corps of Maison and Macdonald.

== Siege ==
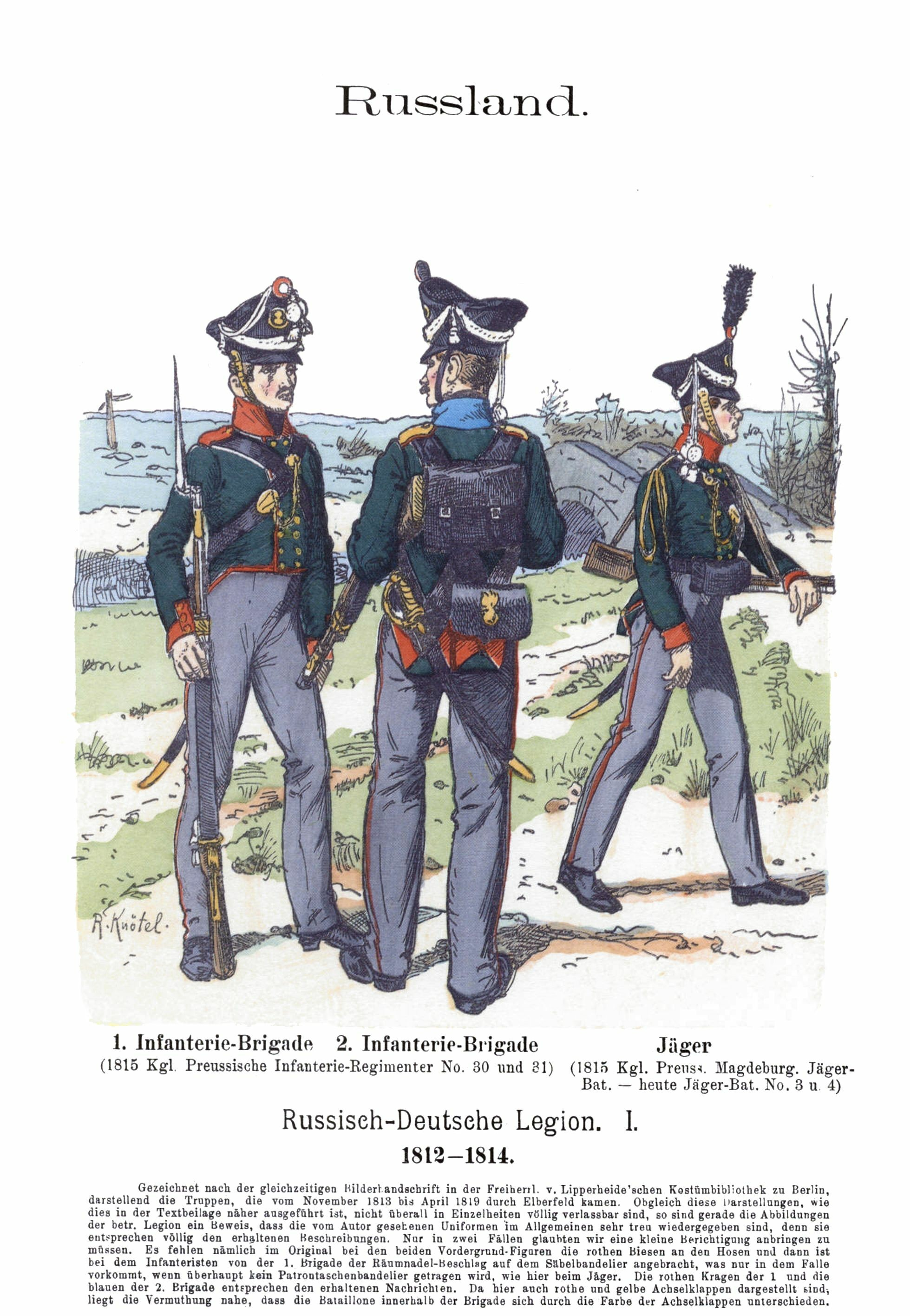
The Russo-German Legion, a British-funded Russian unit of German volunteers, took part in the Siege of Antwerp. Illustration by Richard Knötel, 1890.

On 27 January, as Maison's corps maneuvered towards Leuven and Chernyshyov's towards Liège, the Prussians, aided by a civilian uprising, seized 's-Hertogenbosch before returning towards Antwerp. Its 10,000-men garrison was composed of troops from the I Corps, the Young Guard, and various other corps, in addition to sailors from Missiessy's squadron. In January 1814, the governor of Antwerp was General Anne-Charles Lebrun; he was replaced at the end of the month by Lazare Carnot, an old republican who had long distanced himself from the imperial regime but who returned to service to defend his country from invasion. On the part of the Coalition, Bülow received the order to join the Army of Silesia, commanded by Blücher, in eastern France; he left command of operations in Belgium to the Duke of Saxe-Weimar, who arrived from Germany with reinforcements. On the British side, the Duke of Clarence, Admiral of the Fleet (future King William IV) insisted that the Coalition army attack Antwerp in order to burn the port and the squadron. An attack was carried out towards Merksem from 31 January. On the night of 2 to 3 February, the British bombarded the port; the shelling continued for three days, causing little damage. Finally, the attackers withdrew on 6 February, having lost 1,500 men against 500 French casualties.

In March, General Maison operated in southern Flanders to support Lille and the besieged city of Maubeuge against the forces of the Duke of Saxe-Weimar and the Saxon general Johann von Thielmann. On 26 March, as Antwerp no longer seemed directly threatened, Maison asked General Roguet to leave Antwerp and join him between Ghent and Aalst with his division, consisting of 4,000 infantry, 200 cavalry and 14 cannons, which Roguet did. The Duke of Saxe-Weimar had his forces regrouped for fear of a French attack on Brussels; he asked General Wallmoden to send one of the two brigades of the Russo-German Legion to reinforce the encirclement of Antwerp. In early April, this brigade was relieved by a Swedish unit under Bernadotte and was able to join the main army towards Tournai.

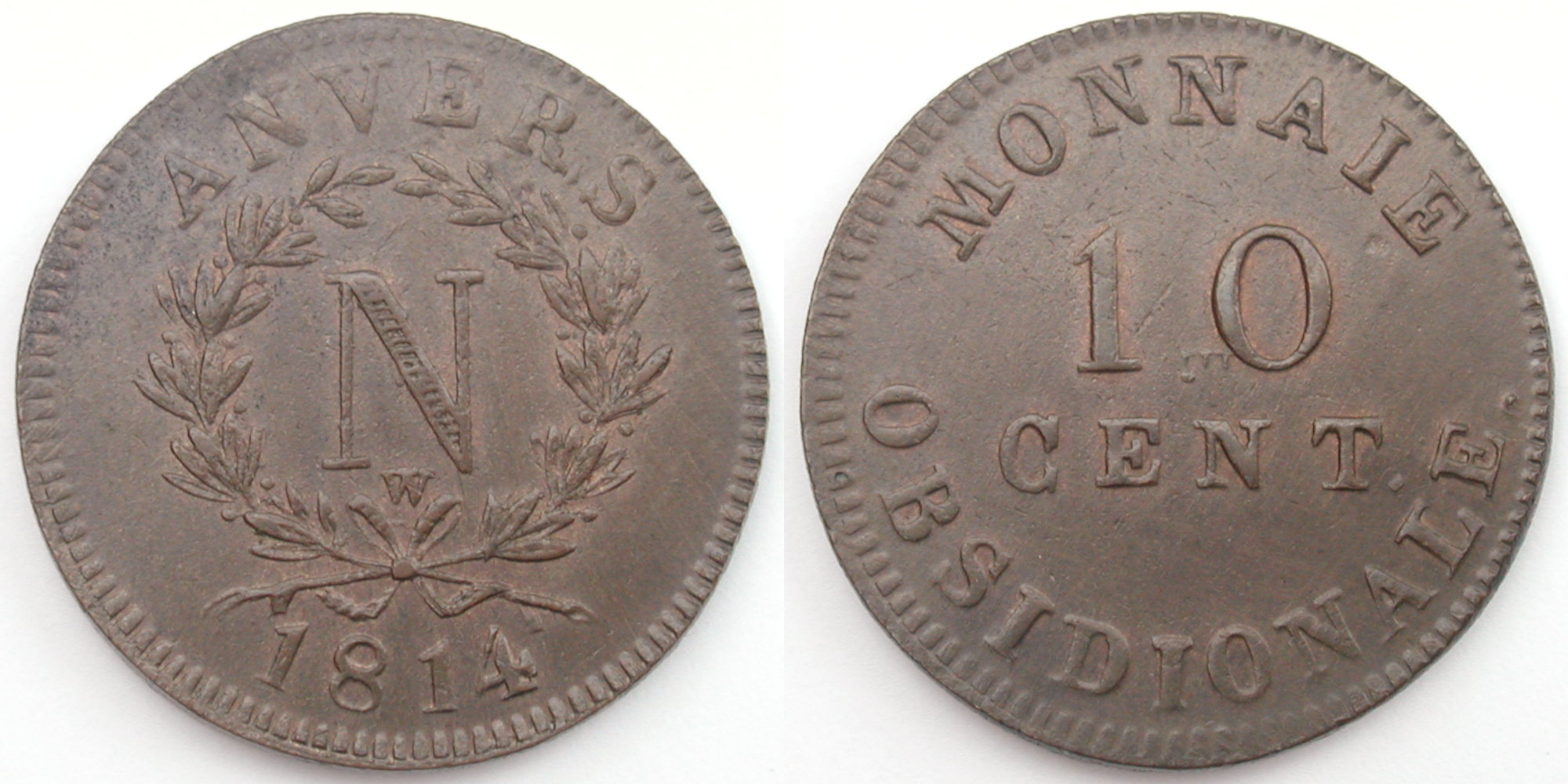
French siege money issued during the siege

Due to a lack of small currency in the city, Carnot decided to have 10 and 5 centime siege coins struck in bronze, first at the private workshop of Antwerp resident Joseph Frans Wolschot on 10 March, then to speed things up, at the naval arsenal on 3 April. He asked Colonel Pierre Lair, head of the military workers, to undertake the minting with the available pendulums using the navy’s metals. He had the hallmarks for these coins engraved by Sergeant Jean Louis Gagnepain.

The news of the fall of Paris and Napoleon's abdication, signed on 6 April, led Maison to conclude an armistice with the Duke of Saxe-Weimar on 7 April, which brought an end to operations in Belgium. The French troops retained the places they occupied on that date. The garrison of Antwerp remained in the city until 4 May. General Graham took possession of Antwerp on behalf of the Coalition, as well as the squadron, which consisted of 38 ships of the line and 10 frigates. A third of this fleet was subsequently returned to France.

== Aftermath ==
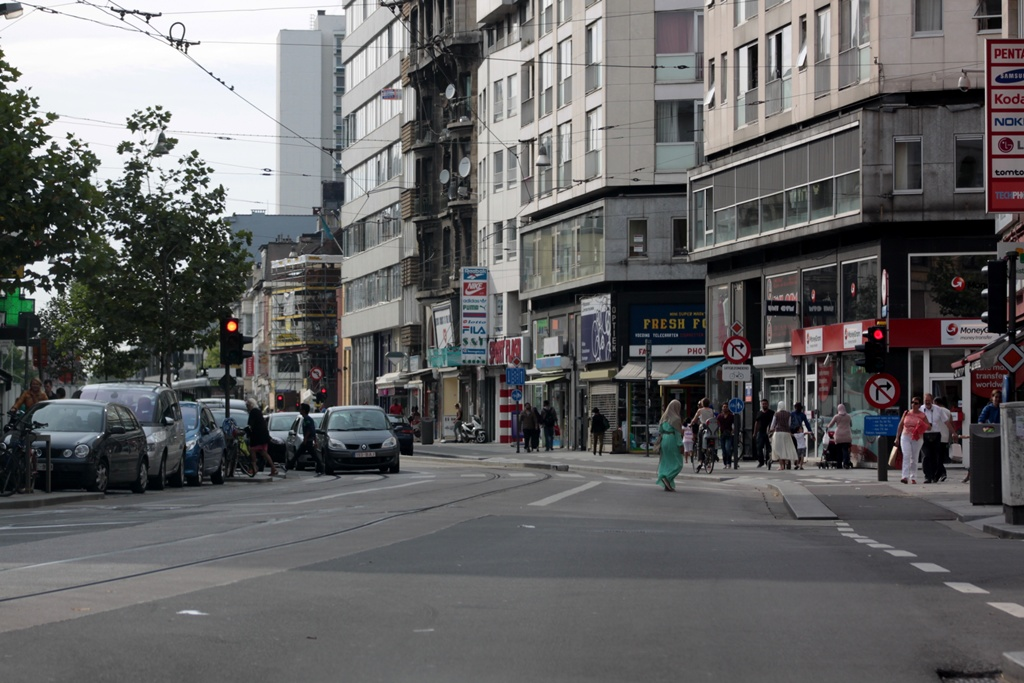
View of Carnotstraat (Carnot Street) in Antwerp, 2013

At the Congress of Vienna in June 1815, Antwerp and all of Belgium was given to the United Kingdom of the Netherlands, governed by the House of Orange, of which it would remain part until the Belgian Revolution of 1830.
