= Battle of Courtrai (1814) =

1814 battle of the War of the Sixth Coalition

- Part of War of the Sixth Coalition
- 1814 Campaign in the Low Countries (in what are now Belgium and Holland)
Date	31 March 1814
Location	Courtrai, Lys, France (now Kortrijk, Belgium) 50°50′N 3°16′E
Result	French victory

Belligerents
France	Saxony; Prussia

Commanders and leaders
(First French Empire) Nicolas Maison	(Kingdom of Saxony) Johann Thielmann (Kingdom of Prussia) Friedrich von Hellwig

Units involved
(First French Empire) I Corps	(Kingdom of Saxony) III German Corps

Strength
9,500–13,000; 35–36 guns	3,800–9,000; 6–7 guns

Casualties and losses
300–800	900–1,908; 2–3 guns lost

War of the Sixth Coalition:
Campaign Low Countries 1814
The color black indicates the current battle.

The Battle of Courtrai (31 March 1814) saw Johann von Thielmann's Saxon troops and a few Prussians encounter an Imperial French force under Nicolas Joseph Maison near Kortrijk (Courtrai), a city south-west of Ghent in what is now Belgium. Thielmann attacked only to find himself facing the bulk of Maison's I Corps. The action ended in a rout of the Saxons, most of whom were under fire for the first time.

While Napoleon battled the main Coalition armies: the Army of Bohemia (or the Grand Army), under the command of the Austrian Prince Schwarzenberg and the Army of Silesia under the command of the Prussian General Prince Blücher in a major campaign in north-east France, a secondary campaign was waged in the Low Countries to the north. A third Coalition body, Army of the North led by Prince Jean Baptiste Bernadotte sent major elements into the Low Countries to drive out the Imperial French occupation forces. In time, the Coalition forces, joined by a British expedition and other reinforcements, succeeded in driving the local French forces back to Lille and isolating most of the remainder in Antwerp.

Badly outnumbered by the Coalition forces under Karl August, Grand Duke of Saxe-Weimar-Eisenach, Maison mounted a daring operation. He marched north from Lille to Antwerp where he added one division from its French garrison to his army. Moving south again, he drubbed the aggressive Thielmann when the Saxon general tried to head him off. The Battle of Paris on 30 March and the subsequent abdication of Napoleon ended the war soon afterwards.

== Background ==
=== Winter operations ===
In late 1813, the Army of the North of about 120,000 men under Prince Jean Baptiste Bernadotte stood on the borders of the Low Countries. The army included Russian and Prussian corps under the command of Ferdinand von Wintzingerode and Friedrich Wilhelm Freiherr von Bülow. This represented the northern wing of an Allied invasion of the French Empire. On 23 November 1813, Bülow's Prussian III Corps advance guard under Adolph Friedrich von Oppen crossed the border into the Netherlands. The III Corps numbered 30,000 men and 96 field guns. On 30 November in the Battle of Arnhem, Bülow defeated Henri François Marie Charpentier's division, inflicting 1,500 casualties on the French while suffering losses of 600 killed and wounded. The Prussian general continued west and captured Utrecht on 2 December. Combined with a Dutch revolt, Bülow's invasion liberated north Holland from the First French Empire very quickly. On 4 December, they were joined by an 8,000-man British expedition led by Thomas Graham, 1st Baron Lynedoch. Despite this promising start, the Coalition effort in the Netherlands stalled when the Russian corps commander Ferdinand von Wintzingerode refused to cooperate with Bülow in December.

On 21 December 1813, Emperor Napoleon appointed Nicolas Joseph Maison to replace his previous commander in the Netherlands, Charles Mathieu Isidore Decaen. The emperor ordered that Antwerp be heavily fortified and that 30,000 French troops be assembled there. In fact, there were only 10,000 soldiers in Antwerp and Napoleon's plans proved unrealistic. On 11 January 1814, Bülow scored a tactical victory over one of Maison's divisions in the Battle of Hoogstraten. Two days later the Prussians and a British brigade under Samuel Gibbs won a second clash over the French at Merksem. However, the strength of Antwerp's defenses persuaded Bülow to leave an observation force and pull the bulk of his corps back to Breda. Graham had little choice but to follow suit.

On 13 January, Wintzingerode's army corps began crossing the Rhine River. This move prompted Marshal Jacques MacDonald, who held the sector east of Maison, to withdraw to the south-west. Wintzingerode advanced very slowly, ostensibly to wait for the arrival of the III German Corps of Karl August, Grand Duke of Saxe-Weimar-Eisenach. On 1 February, Maison abandoned Brussels, leaving François Roguet's division and 8,000 additional troops to defend Antwerp. With his remaining 4,133 soldiers the French general retreated to Lille. Anxious to join the main armies of Karl Philipp, Prince of Schwarzenberg and Gebhard Leberecht von Blücher, Bülow ordered a series of attacks on the fortress of Gorinchem, which were unsuccessful. The Prussian agreed to help Graham in a second attempt to seize Antwerp from 1–6 February; this failed and cost the Prussians 687 casualties. Bülow occupied Brussels on 8 February and then moved south on 18 February. Leaving one brigade behind, he marched toward Laon with the remainder of the III Prussian Corps. Antoine-Guillaume Rampon surrendered Gorinchem to the Prussians on 7 February.

=== Spring operations ===
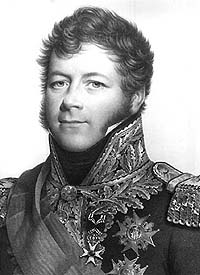
Nicolas Maison

The 16th Military District, commanded by Antoine François Brenier de Montmorand was only able to provide 6,600 men for the army. The conscripts were poorly equipped and clothed and Maison found it necessary to use most of them to man garrisons, leaving only 1,100 troops to reinforce his field force. With his weak forces at Lille, Maison faced a three-pronged attack by Johann von Thielmann on 21 March 1814. After some brisk fighting, two columns forced a crossing of the Marque and thrust toward Lezennes. The Saxons were counter-attacked in front by Pierre Barrois' division while Jean-Baptiste Solignac's infantry division and the cavalry moved to Sainghin-en-Mélantois. With their left flank threatened, the Saxon columns pulled back behind the Marque. Bertrand Pierre Castex's Guard cavalry charged their enemies near Bouvines, capturing 60 and cutting down another 100. The Saxons withdrew to Tournai that evening where they joined a third column which had marched as far as Orchies before being blocked by the 75th Line Infantry Regiment and 200 French cavalry.

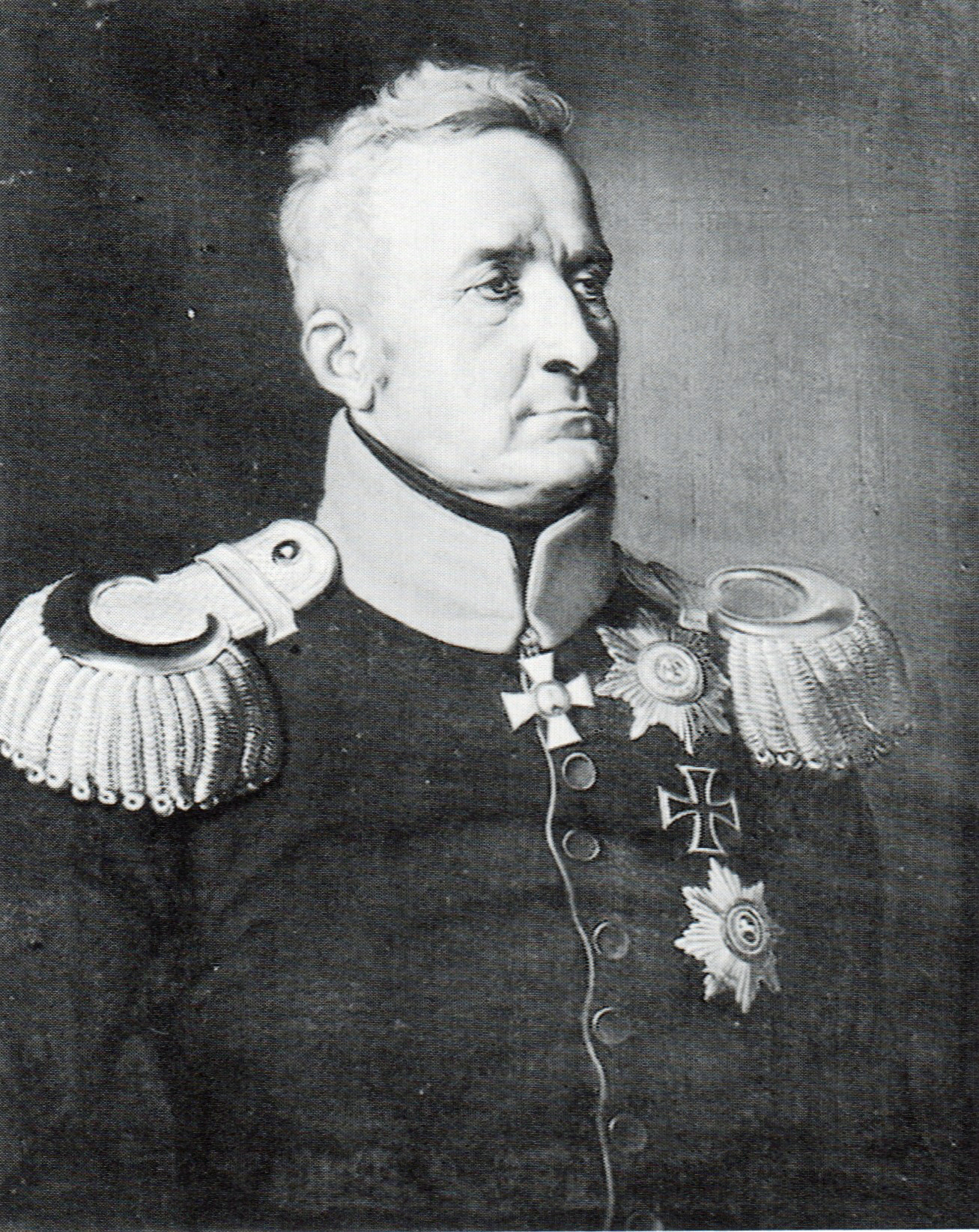
Johann von Thielmann

By late March 1814, I Corps numbered 7,103 soldiers, including 5,611 infantry, 1,015 cavalry and 477 gunners. Hoping to add more troops to his small corps, Maison ordered Antwerp's commander Lazare Carnot to hold Roguet's division ready to break out. When he heard that the Duke of Saxe-Weimar fully committed his forces to an attack on Maubeuge, Maison saw his opportunity. On 25 March, the I Corps sortied from Lille with Barrois' 2,971-strong 4th Young Guard Division, Solignac's 2,820-man infantry division, Castex's 990 cavalry and Henri Marie Lenoury with 477 artillerists and 21 guns. Early that day, Maison's force drove Major Friedrich von Hellwig's Freikorps from Menen (Menin). The French commander sent Raymond Pierre Penne's brigade east to Petegem so that the Allies might think his target was Oudenaarde. Penne's soldiers marched 38 miles (61 km) that day.

On 26 March, Penne's brigade turned north and rejoined the main body of I Corps as its advanced guard. The French overran Deinze and appeared before Ghent at 2:00 pm, completely surprising its defenders, a Belgian regiment in the process of formation, 200 Don Cossacks and two artillery pieces. The Cossacks courageously rode out to fight the French but were cut to pieces by the 2nd Guard Light Horse Lancer Regiment. The commander escaped but most of his irregulars were captured or killed. The French broke into the city and rounded up the would-be Belgian soldiers as prisoners of war. Maison wisely decided not to shoot the Belgians as traitors though they were still legally French citizens. Maison sent his chief of staff Colonel Villatte from Ghent to Antwerp escorted by 50 cavalrymen and one company of light infantry riding in wagons. That night Villatte reached Antwerp with orders for Carnot to release Roguet's division and whatever lancers and honor guards were available.

On 27 March Roguet's division left Antwerp and marched to Gontrode near Ghent. Maison hoped to persuade the Coalition commanders that he intended to attack Brussels via Aalst when he only wanted to get back to Lille safely. Altogether, 4,000 infantry, 260 cavalry and 14 guns were added to I Corps from the Antwerp garrison to increase its numbers to 9,700 foot soldiers, 1,360 horsemen and 35 cannon. Napoleon's War Minister Henri Jacques Guillaume Clarke hoped that Carnot might draw 3,000 marines and sailors from Edouard Thomas Burgues de Missiessy's French squadron that was bottled up in the Scheldt. When Thielmann found out about Maison's capture of Ghent, he concentrated 5,000 men in seven Saxon battalions at Oudenaarde.

Thielmann correctly deduced that the French manoeuvrer was designed to reinforce I Corps. But his superior the Duke of Saxe-Weimar believed that Maison wanted to capture Brussels, a belief that the Frenchman encouraged by spreading false rumours among the Belgians. Saxe-Weimar shifted Ludwig von Wallmoden-Gimborn's division from Leuven to Aalst where he concentrated 9,000 foot soldiers and 900 horsemen. Coalition detachments reoccupied Courtrai, Deinze and Harelbeke while Helwig's Freikorps was sent to observe Valenciennes and Condé-sur-l'Escaut. The real danger to Maison remained Thielmann who might cut off the French with his total force of 12,000 troops in 15 battalions and 500 cavalry. On 30 March, Maison abandoned Ghent, marching south-west along the Leie River with the main body of I Corps. To shield the movement, he sent Solignac's division and one squadron of the 2nd Guard Chasseurs à Cheval Regiment farther east to Petegem. At Deinze the main body brushed aside Major Puckler's small force and continued to Courtrai. The latter place was evacuated by some Prussian cavalry when the I Corps appeared.

== Battle ==
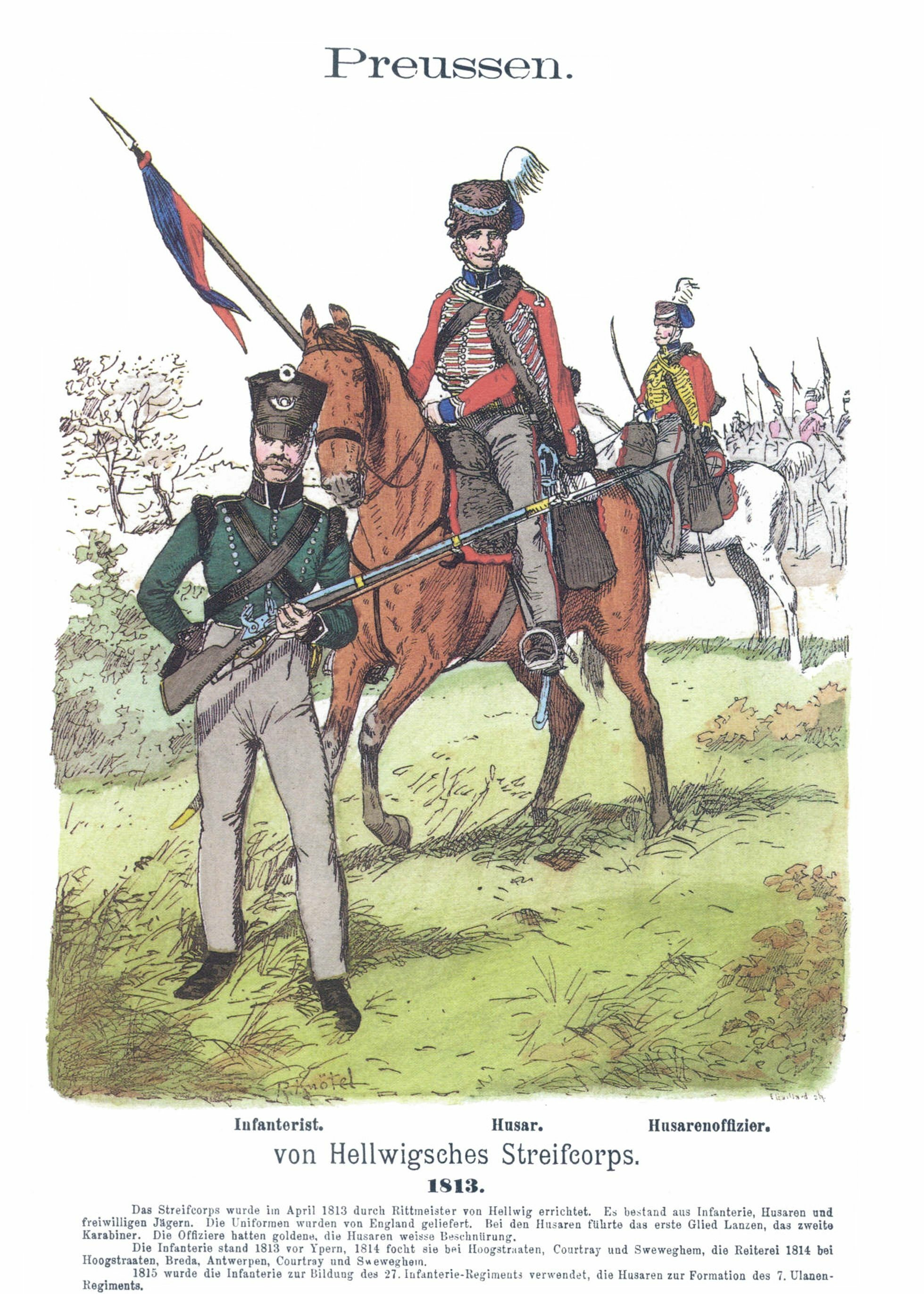
Hellwig's Streifcorps

Finding that Maison evacuated Ghent, Thielmann moved south-west to Avelgem, hoping catch Solignac's division. He called in some dispersed troops and invited Wallmoden to march to Oudenaarde to help defeat the French. Thielmann's 2nd Brigade under Prince Paul von Württemberg took the main road from Avelgem, while Brause's 1st Brigade used a different route. At 6:00 am on 31 March, Brause's brigade cleared the French outposts from Zwevegem. The 1st Battalion of the 1st Saxon Landwehr Regiment covered the right flank toward Harelbeke while Hellwig's Freikorps covered the left flank in the direction of Bellegem. The 2nd and 3rd Battalions of the Saxon Landwehr and four guns constituted the reserve while the remainder of 1st Brigade formed the centre. While the 1st Brigade deployed, the 2nd Brigade arrived in Zwevegem. When Brause reported a French battle line in front of him, Thielmann and Prince Paul went forward to investigate. After an inspection, Thielmann waved his troops forward.

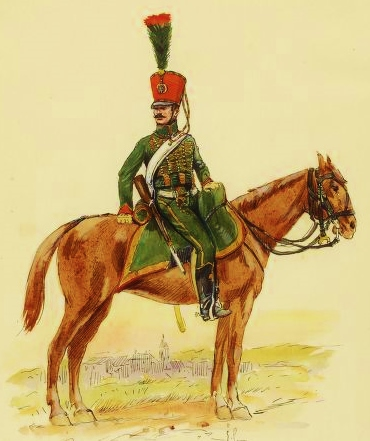
2nd Guard Chasseurs à Cheval

The 2nd Brigade deployed with two and one-half battalions forward. In reserve were the 3rd Battalion of the 3rd Saxon Landwehr Regiment and the Schwarzberg Battalion on the Windmill Hill. Seeing the Saxons approaching only from the direction of Oudenaarde, Maison resolved to envelop both flanks. He ordered Solignac to move from Bellegem to strike the Saxon left flank while Barrois advanced from Harelbeke to turn the Saxon right flank. Roguet's division supported by Castex's cavalry would hold the center while the other divisions wheeled inward. The quality of Maison's troops was superior to their opponents. The French units consisted of veteran cadres filled up with conscripts while the Saxon Landwehr had never been in battle before.

Prince Paul deployed the 1st and 2nd Battalions of the 3rd Saxon Landwehr Regiment into a closed column with the Bernberg Battalion behind them. Sending five companies of Saxons and two companies from the Schwarzberg Battalion ahead as skirmishers, Paul ordered an attack, apparently without specific orders. Maison responded by ordering a body of French skirmishers to hit Thielmann's left flank while sending four of Roguet's battalions forward, led by the 10th Tirailleur Regiment. The attack pressed back the 1st Battalion of the 1st Saxon Landwehr. By now a large portion of the Saxon force was deployed as skirmishers in a noisy musketry duel.

When Thielmann finally realized he was engaged with the whole I Corps, he immediately ordered a retreat. The 2nd and 3rd Battalions of the 1st Saxon Landwehr were helped out of a difficult situation by a charge by the Saxon Hussars. As the divisions of Barrois and Solignac closed in from the flanks, the Saxon division lost cohesion. Jean-Luc Darriule's brigade led Barrois' attack while Penne's brigade led Solignac's advance. Castex led a cavalry charge by the 2nd Guard Chasseurs à Cheval which threw back the Saxon Cuirassiers and got among the Saxon infantry. Thielmann's formations disintegrated, the individual soldiers scattering across the countryside. Either the 2nd or 3rd Battalion of the 3rd Saxon Landwehr was trapped against a wall and surrendered in a body. Darriule's brigade pursued as far as the hamlet of Kerkhove and some panicked Saxons drowned while trying to swim across the Scheldt.

== Results ==
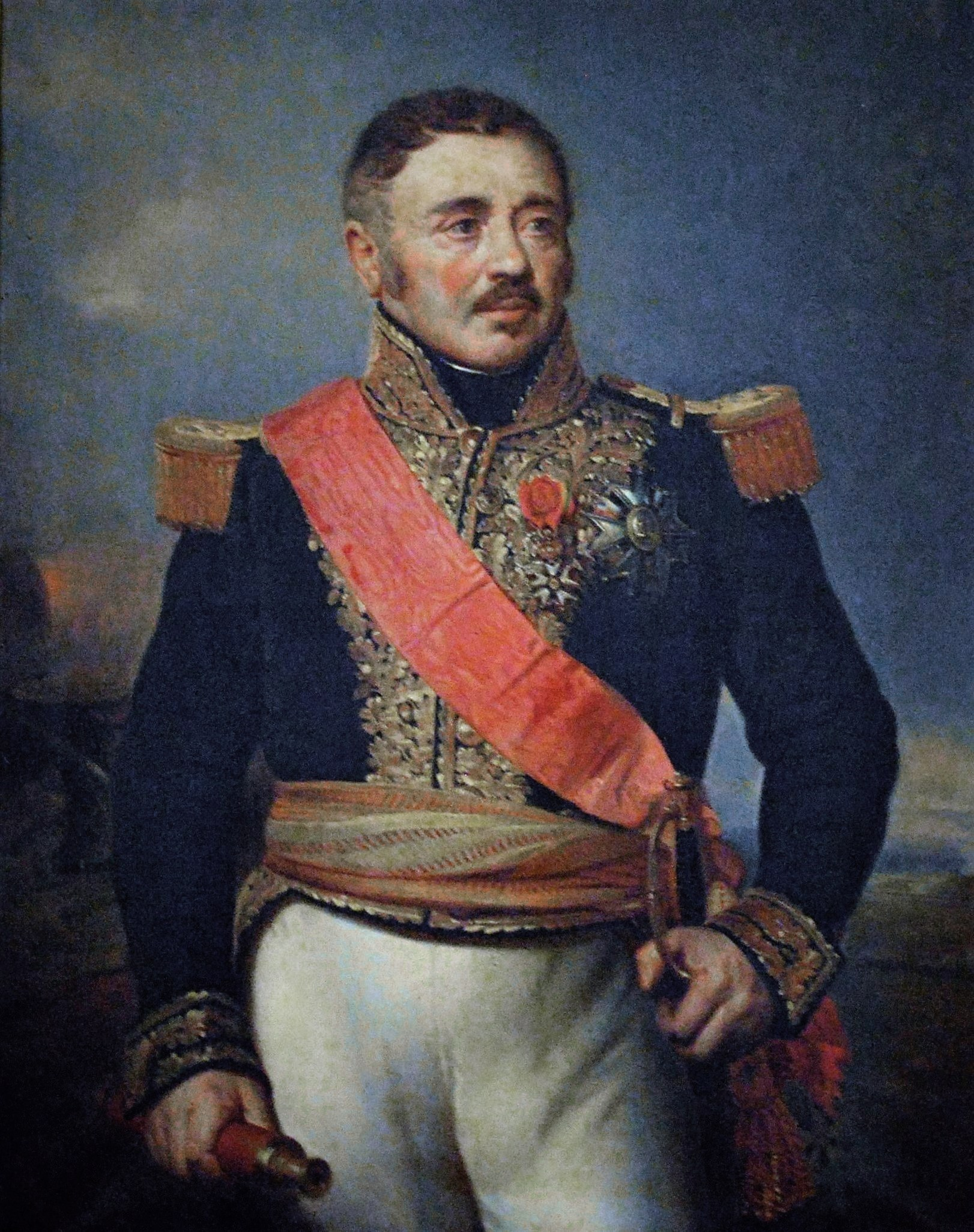
Pierre Barrois

One authority gave French casualties as 24 officers and an estimated 800 men out of 7,500 infantry, 2,000 cavalry and 36 guns engaged. Saxon losses were listed as 695 killed and wounded and 1,213 men and two guns captured for a total of 1,908 casualties. The same authority stated that 3,800 men and six guns from the 1st, 2nd, 3rd and 4th Saxon Landwehr Regiments and two Russian Cossack Pulks were present. Another authority estimated French losses as 300 and reported several sets of Saxon losses. One account listed that the Saxons lost 255 killed, 440 wounded and 512 captured, a total of 1,207 casualties, a second that total losses were 1,900, a third that losses were about 1,100 and a fourth tally of Saxon losses as 800–900 men and three 6-pound cannons. The 2nd and 3rd Battalions of the 3rd Saxon Landwehr were particularly hard-hit, the two units had to be converged because their numbers shrank by at least 746 soldiers between 25 March and 20 April.

Maison sent Solignac's division toward Tournai, followed by Roguet's division and the cavalry. While, Barrois watched the road to Avelgem, the French artillery bombarded the 2,000 Coalition soldiers in Tournai as night fell. In fact, Maison's threat to Tournai was designed to distract his enemies until his slow-moving wagon train could reach Lille. During the day Wallmoden marched from Aalst to Oudenaarde and sent a column under Heinrich Christoph von Lottum to reoccupy Ghent. When Lottum tried to seize Courtrai, he bumped into the withdrawing Ghent garrison under Charles Eugène de Lalaing d'Audenarde and was compelled to fall back to Harelbeke. The Duke of Weimar directed Thielmann's mauled division toward Tournai, assigned Karl Christian Erdmann von Le Coq's division to occupy Mons, sent Wallmoden to Lessines and placed his reserve in Ath. Maison was badly outnumbered and had little choice but to abandon Courtrai and withdraw to Lille.

Maison next moved toward Valenciennes in order to disrupt the Coalition supply line, reaching there on 5 April. That day he found out that Paris was occupied by the Coalition. The French lost the Battle of Paris on 30 March and Napoleon abdicated on 6 April. Maison and Thielmann agreed to an armistice on 7 April and the fighting was over.

== Forces ==
=== French Order of Battle ===
I Corps: General of Division Nicolas Joseph Maison (11,258, 21 guns)

- 4th Young Guard Division: General of Division Pierre Barrois (2,971)
  - Brigade: General of Brigade Jean-Luc Darriule
    - 2nd Tirailleur Regiment (1st and 2nd Battalions)
    - 3rd Tirailleur Regiment (1st and 2nd Battalions)
  - Brigade: unknown
    - 4th Tirailleur Regiment (1st and 2nd Battalions)
    - 12th Voltigeur Regiment (1st and 2nd Battalions)
- 6th Young Guard Division: General of Division François Roguet (c. 4,000)
  - Brigades: unknown
    - 9th Tirailleur Regiment (1st and 2nd Battalions)
    - 10th Tirailleur Regiment (1st and 2nd Battalions)
    - 11th Tirailleur Regiment (1st and 2nd Battalions)
    - 12th Tirailleur Regiment (1st and 2nd Battalions)
    - 13th Tirailleur Regiment (1st and 2nd Battalions)
- Infantry Division: General of Division Jean-Baptiste Solignac (2,820)
  - Brigade: General of Brigade Raymond Raymond Pierre Penne
    - 27th Light Infantry Regiment (detachment)
    - 17th Line Infantry Regiment (detachment)
    - 28th Line Infantry Regiment (detachment)
  - Brigade: unknown
    - 51st Line Infantry Regiment (detachment)
    - 55th Line Infantry Regiment (detachment)
    - 65th Line Infantry Regiment (detachment)
    - 75th Line Infantry Regiment (detachment)
- Cavalry Division: General of Division Bertrand Pierre Castex (990)
  - Brigades: unknown
    - 2nd Guard Chasseurs à Cheval Regiment
    - 2nd Guard Light Horse Lancer Regiment
    - 1st Honor Guard Regiment
- Corps Artillery: General of Brigade Henri Marie Lenoury (477, 21 guns) 25 March 1814
  - Colonel Brouet (1,501, 35 guns) 1 April 1814: as follows
  - Two 12-pounders, 22 6-pounders, two 4-pounders, nine 5.6-inch howitzers
    - 3rd Guard Horse Artillery Company
    - 1st Horse Artillery Regiment, 7th Company
    - 1st Young Guard Foot Artillery Company
    - 3rd Young Guard Foot Artillery Company
    - 7th Young Guard Foot Artillery Company
    - 13th Young Guard Foot Artillery Company
    - 9th Foot Artillery Regiment, 9th Company
  - Corps Train
    - 1st Young Guard Train (7th, 8th, 10th and 12th Companies)
    - 2nd Young Guard Train (1st, 7th, 8th and 12th Companies)
- Ghent Garrison: General of Brigade Charles Eugène de Lalaing d'Audenarde
  - 2nd Guard Light-Horse Lancer Regiment (832)
  - Elite Gendarmes (55)
  - Gendarmes (1st and 2nd Squadrons, 147)
  - Tirailleur Regiment (one of 9th–13th detached from 6th Young Guard Division)

- Source: Nafziger 2015, pp. 363, 368, 710–711

=== Saxon Order of Battle ===
Saxon Division: General-Leutnant Johann von Thielmann (7,725, 7 guns)

- 1st Brigade: General-major von Brause
  - 1st Saxon Provisional Regiment (2nd and 3rd Battalions, 1,158)
  - 1st Saxon Landwehr Regiment (1st, 2nd and 3rd Battalions, 2,257)
  - Saxon Hussar Regiment (1st, 2nd and 3rd Squadrons, 580)
- Unattached:
  - Hellwig's Freikorps
- 2nd Brigade: General-major Prince Paul von Württemberg
  - Schwarzberg Landwehr Battalion (462)
  - Bernberg Landwehr Battalion (440)
  - 3rd Saxon Landwehr Regiment (1st, 2nd and 3rd Battalions, 2,129)
  - Saxon Cuirassier Regiment (1st, 2nd and 3rd Squadrons, 579)
  - 1st Saxon Foot Battery (120)
    - Two Saxon 6-pound, three French 6-pound and two English 9-pound cannons
