= Battle of Hoogstraten =

1814 battle of the War of the Sixth Coalition

- Part of the War of the Sixth Coalition
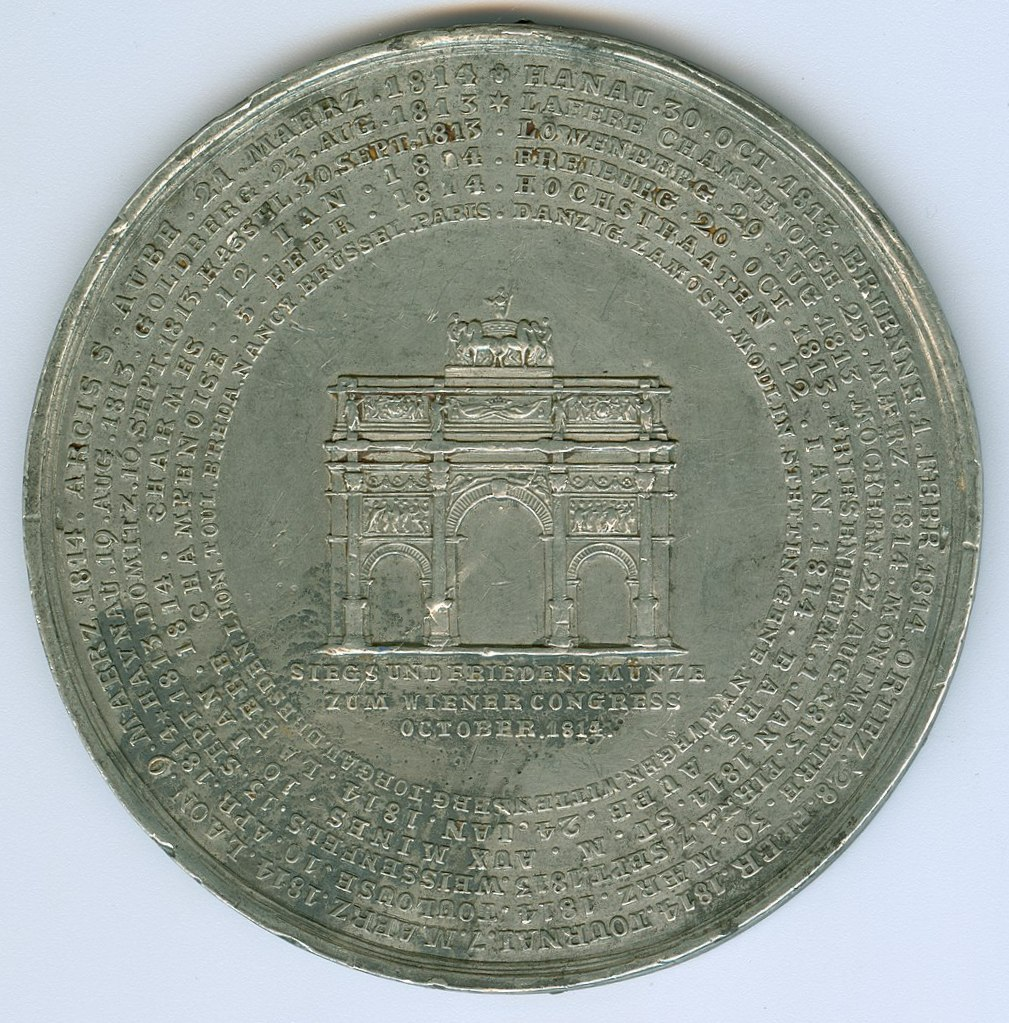
- Medal made for the Congress of Vienna in October 1813, including the Battle of Hoogstraten
Date	11 January 1814
Location	Hoogstraten, Deux-Nèthes, France (now Belgium) 51°24′N 4°46′E
Result	Coalition victory

Belligerents
(First French Empire) French Empire	(Kingdom of Prussia) Prussia; United Kingdom; Russia

Commanders and leaders
(First French Empire) François Roguet	(Kingdom of Prussia) Friedrich von Bülow (United Kingdom) Thomas Graham (Russian Empire) Ferdinand von Wintzingerode

Strength
10,000	12,000

Casualties and losses
300–747 killed or wounded 216–500 captured	465–500 killed or wounded

War of the Sixth Coalition:
Campaign Low Countries 1814
The color black indicates the current battle.

The Battle of Hoogstraten was fought on 11 January 1814 between a French army, led by François Roguet, and a Russo-Prussian-British army, led by Friedrich Wilhelm Freiherr von Bülow. The battle, which ended in Bülow's victory, consisted of a series of engagements situated between Essen and Turnhout. The battle was named after Hoogstraten, the main town of the Kempen region.

== French retreat towards Belgium ==
After the battle of Leipzig and the French army's retreat towards France, the Allied forces invaded the Low Countries, then part of the French Empire. On 20 December 1813, Emperor Napoleon sent the 3rd Division of the Young Guard, commanded by François Roguet, towards Breda to retake the town which had been abandoned by the French garrison, and had now declared to side with the Allied cause. After three days of fighting the French lifted their siege and retreated and concentrated their army around Hoogstraten. On 11 January 1814 the Allies launched their offensive from Breda towards Antwerp in order to capture the important Port of Antwerp.

== Opposing forces ==
The Allied army consisted of the III Prussian Corps, led by von Bülow, and the British expeditionary Corps, led by Thomas Graham. III Prussian Corps consisted of three Prussian infantry brigades (Borstell, Thümen and Krafft), three Prussian cavalry brigades under Oppen and a detached Russian divisional unit under Ferdinand Freiherr von Wintzingerode. The British Expeditionary Corps consisted of the 1st Division under George Cooke (Guards Brigade and Skerrett's brigade) and the 2nd Division under Kenneth MacKenzie (Taylor's brigade and Gibb's brigade).

The defending French army consisted of a division of tirailleurs of the Young Guard under François Roguet, an undermanned regular infantry division under Jean-Jacques Ambert, and a cavalry division of the Young Guard under Charles Lefebvre-Desnouettes, with Roguet in overall command.

== Battle ==
On 11 January 1814, three Prussian brigades attacked on a line from Kalmthout to Merksplas. On their right flank the Prussians were supported by the British Expeditionary Corps, which marched towards Antwerp. Hindered by a snowstorm the brigade led by Karl Ludwig von Borstell, followed by the other brigades, attacked the French line. 15,000 allied soldiers attacked 6,000 defending French troops. Heavy fighting took place in the town centers of Wuustwezel, Loenhout, Wortel, Minderhout and Hoogstraten. Around 2 o'clock Hoogstraten fell in Prussian hands. By nightfall fighting continued in Merksplas, Oostmalle and Westmalle. Roguet managed to extricate his troops and fell back to Antwerp.

== Aftermath ==
The victorious Prussians lost 465 men, mainly in Borstell's brigade. The French lost 747 dead and wounded officers and soldiers and a further 16 officers and 200 soldiers were taken prisoner of war, giving the French a loss of 13 percent of their available troops.

After the French retreat to Antwerp, the Allies besieged the city, which was held by the French led by Lazare Carnot until Napoleon's abdication. The city was only handed over to the Allies in May 1814.
