= Siege of Breda (1813) =

- Part of the War of the Sixth Coalition
Date	19–22 December 1813
Location	Breda, Deux-Nèthes, France (present-day Netherlands) 51°35′00″N 4°47′00″E
Result	Coalition victory

Belligerents
First French Empire	Sixth Coalition: Russian Empire; United Netherlands; Kingdom of Prussia

Commanders and leaders
(First French Empire) François Roguet (First French Empire) Lefebvre-Desnouettes	(Netherlands) General-Major van der Plaat (Russian Empire) General-Major Stahl (Russian Empire) Alexander Chechenskiy (Kingdom of Prussia) Major Von Colomb

Strength
12,000 infantry 26 cannons	(Netherlands); Phaffs' Infantry Regiment - 400; Breda militia - 500 (Russian Empire); 1,200 infantry 4 cannons 2 squadrons hussars (Kingdom of Prussia) 170 hussars From 20 December (Netherlands) 9 cannons
- Location within Netherlands Siege of Breda (1813) (North Sea)

The siege of Breda took place from 19 to 22 December 1813 and was a small yet important engagement between French and allied troops in the War of the Sixth Coalition. Breda was abandoned by its garrison early in December and occupied by a Russian force. With Breda being the strategic link between the French garrisons of Gorinchem and Antwerp, and to hold control over the main road between Breda and Antwerp, the French began a counterattack. Meanwhile, Allied reinforcements were underway. After a scramble for the town and a three-day siege, the French withdrew back to Antwerp, and Breda became a distribution point for Allied troops and supplies.

== Background ==
After the Battle of Leipzig in October 1813, the Allied troops advanced further towards Holland. A Russian force of 5,000 troops under general Count Alexander von Benckendorff crossed the border early in November, leading to a panicked flight of the French troops, who gathered themselves in a number of strong garrisons. The Cossack regiments of Benckendorffs' command advanced deep into the Netherlands, and reached as far as Amsterdam, Den Helder and the Hague.

== The French retreat ==
A cossack detachment under Major-general Stahl advanced towards Breda. By having civilian volunteers spread the rumour that 3,000 cossacks were on their way, and more Prussian infantry following them, the French garrison abandoned the town, and Stahl could march into Breda unopposed on 10 December. Two days later, the town officials declared their allegiance to the Prince of Orange and raised a volunteer corps of 500 men. Benckendorff arrived with his main force in Breda. Realising the defensive works of Breda were in a sorry state, and his force -consisting mostly of cossacks and cavalry- would not be able to withstand a French counterattack, he requested that infantry and artillery reinforcements would be sent immediately. However, the Prussian III Corps under Von Bülow were engaged at the siege of Gorinchem and the British troops were still in Zeeland. The Provisional Government in The Hague was eager to help: two ships with guns and ammunition, a coastal artillery company and a battalion of four companies from the infantry regiment of Colonel Phaff were sent to help defend Breda.

== The French counterattack ==
Since Breda formed the link between Gorinchem and Antwerp, a French force was gathered to recapture the town. 12,000 men and 26 cannon under generals Rouget and Lefebvre-Desnouettes began their advance from Antwerp over the main road towards Breda on 19 December. This force easily chased away the cossack advanced posts near Zundert and reached Breda the following day. Since the buildings around the town had not been demolished to create a clear line of fire, the French were able to safely take up positions near the town walls. After a demand to surrender the town was declined, the French began their bombardment. Meanhwhile, a Prussian Streifkorps under Major Von Colomb which had screened the French advance, entered the town on the other side, having advanced towards Breda on a parallel road. Although the French had not yet encircled the town, they immediately began a first attack on the Antwerp Gate, which was defended by 250 Russian light infantrymen of the 2nd Egersky Regiment. During the attack, the Dutch battalion arrived and was immediately directed towards the Antwerp Gate. The first French attack had been fought off, but it was clear there were not enough troops to withstand the French once they had encircled the town. The French even had managed to set up a position on the glacis, which meant they could fire on the defenders and launch a new attack.

== The siege ==
The ships with cannon and ammunition were nearby, but the crews had seen French patrols and were afraid to go near Breda. Upon hearing this, a patrol of 200 cossacks was sent out to chase the French cavalry away and guide the ships into Breda. In the evening, the ships arrived, bringing nine 12- and 24 lbs cannon and 60,000 lbs gunpowder and projectiles. Russians, Cossacks, Prussians and Dutch troops, aided by civilians, worked frantically all night to build artillery emplacements and strengthen the defences, which was hampered by the French continued bombardments, as well as by the inexperience of those involved, and the language problems (Von Colomb mentioned in his memoires that it was reminiscent of "the building of the Tower of Babel)". Nevertheless, the hard work paid off: when the French resumed their bombardment on the 21st, it was answered by a counter bombardment, which caused the loss of several French guns. The French launched attacks against the Antwerp Gate and Water Gate, but also managed to move a detachment even further around the town and attack the Bosch Gate, which was not covered by artillery. 150 Dutch infantry and the Breda Volunteers were sent over to counter this surprise attack. The fighting continued all day until nightfall. During the night, the bridge before the Antwerp Gate was demolished by the defenders, and the French advanced post on the glacis swept away by four Russian artillery pieces. The French continued their bombardment the following day, but realising they had lost the momentum, retreated towards Antwerp the next day, plundering the countryside. The Prussian and Russian cavalry followed them closely.

== Aftermath ==
Once the Prussians of Bülow's Corps arrived in the town, the inhabitants were relieved that there would be no more French attacks. Breda would be used as a transit point for Allied troops and provisions for the siege of Antwerp. The defences of Breda were rebuilt, the town being once again an important defensive stronghold.
