= Battle of Altenburg =

1813 battle during the War of the Sixth Coalition

- Part of the German campaign of the Sixth Coalition
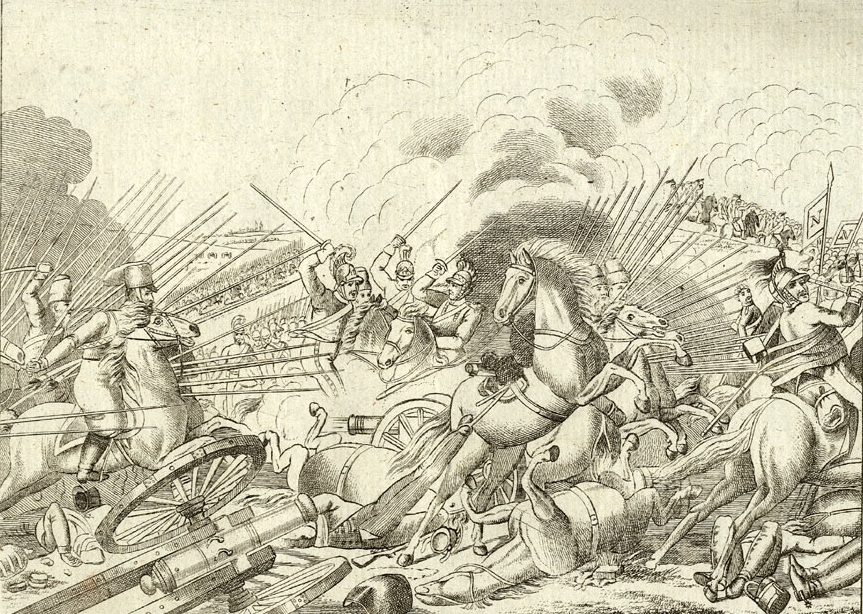
- Battle of Altenburg engraved by Ant. Tessaro
Date	28 September 1813
Location	Altenburg, Saxe-Gotha-Altenburg 50°59′6″N 12°26′0″E
Result	Coalition victory

Belligerents
Prussia; Austria; Russia	France; Baden

Commanders and leaders
Thielmann; Mensdorff; Platov	Charles Lefebvre-Desnouettes

Strength
Unknown	8,000

Casualties and losses
300 dead or wounded	600 dead or wounded 1,000–1,400 taken prisoner
- Location within Europe

War of the Sixth Coalition:
German campaign
current battle
Napoleon in command
Napoleon not in command

The raid at Altenburg on 28 September 1813 took place during the War of the Sixth Coalition's German Campaign of 1813. The raid was carried out by the Streifkorp under the command of Saxon General Johann von Thielmann commanding seven regiments of Cossacks, a squadron each of Saxon Hussars and Dragoons, and a detachment of Saxon Freikorps numbering about 1,500 cavalry. The objective of the raid was to attempt harassment of the French lines of communication 25 miles (45 km) south of Leipzig shortly before the Battle of Leipzig. The Austrian contingent was commanded by Emmanuel Mensdorff and the Russian contingent of Cossacks by Matvei Platov.

== Background ==
The battle was the culmination of a raid in which Thielmann's cavalry successfully attacked Napoleon's lines of communications along the roads between Erfurt and Leipzig in the Saale valley.

== Battle ==
Thielmann completely surprised and routed a larger force of French cavalry, including Cavalry of the Imperial Guard and a small force of 2nd Baden Infantry Regiment (Infanterie-Regiment No.2 ‘Markgraf Wilhelm’) nominally under the command of Lefebvre-Desnouettes numbering some 8,000. The French, completely surprised, broke and fled from Altenburg, losing a third of their number (2,100), in the process running over the Baden infantry, which was taken prisoner despite attempting to resist. Thielmann's force lost about 200 in casualties.
