= Jean-Baptiste Solignac =

French general

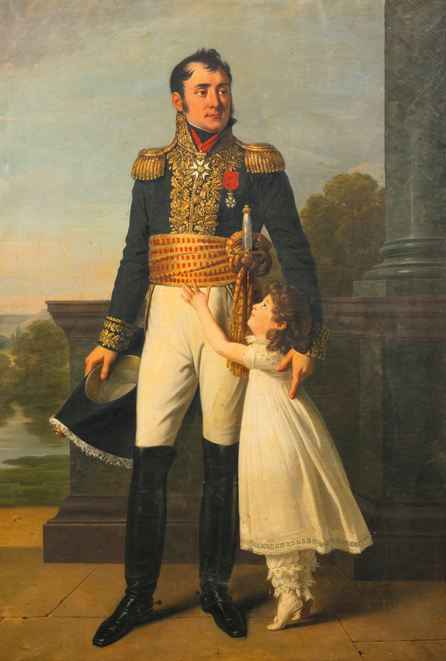
- General Solignac and his daughter Caroline
- Born: 15 March 1773; Millau, Aveyron, France
- Died: 11 November 1850 (aged 77) Montpellier, Hérault, France
- Allegiance: Kingdom of France; France
- Branch: Infantry
- Service years: 1790–1815, 1830–1834
- Rank: General of Division
- Conflicts: War of the Pyrenees; War of the First Coalition; War of the Second Coalition; Battle of Magnano; Battle of Novi; War of the Third Coalition; Battle of Caldiero; Peninsular War; Invasion of Portugal; Battle of Evora; Battle of Vimeiro; Siege of Astorga; Battle of Fuentes de Oñoro; Battle of Courtrai
- Awards: Legion of Honor, GO

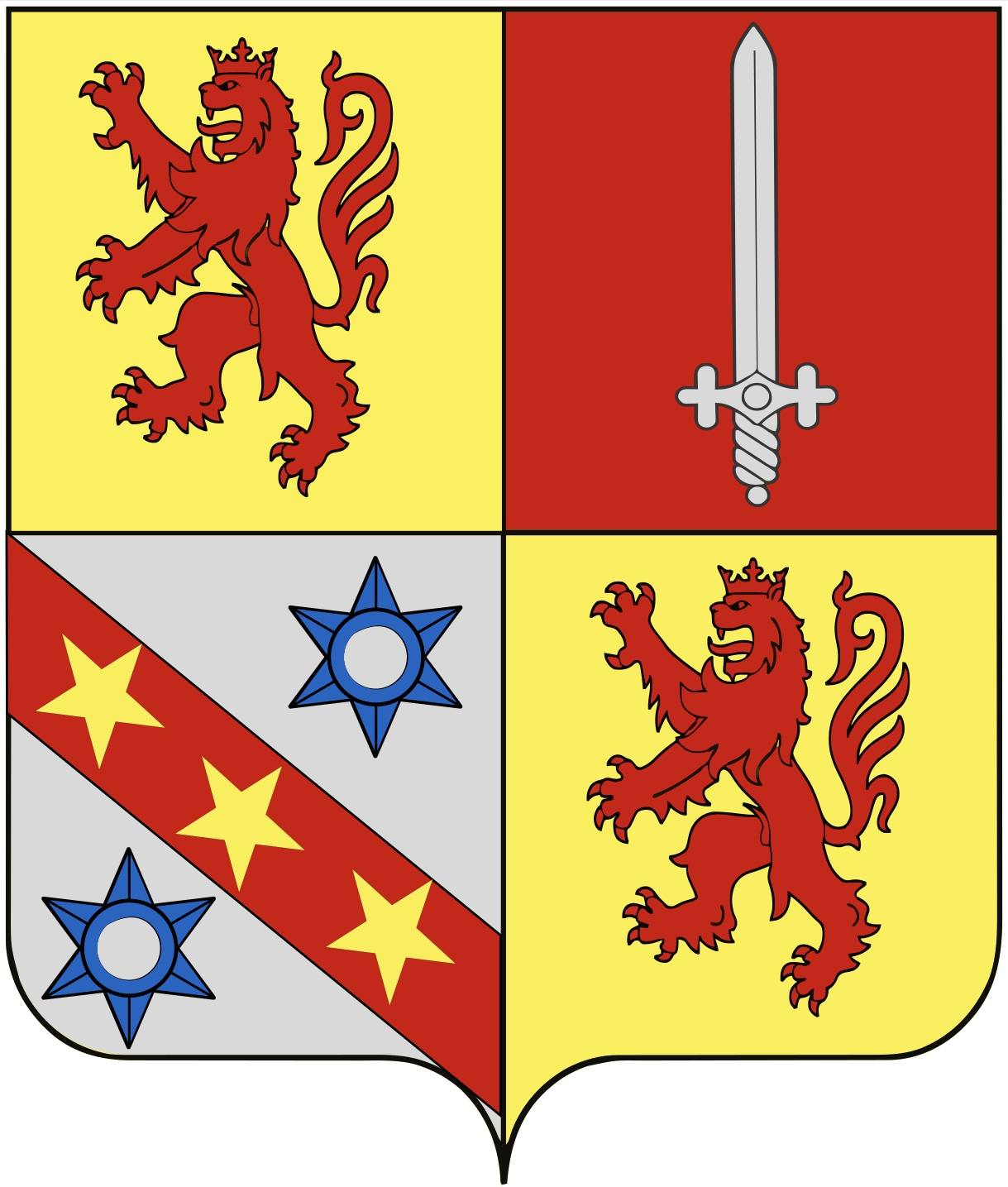
Armoiries Jean Baptiste de Solignac: Écartelé : au 1 et 4 d'or au lion contourné de gueules ; au 2 de gueules à l'épée haute d'argent ; au 3 d'argent à la bande de gueules chargée de trois étoiles d'or et accompagnée de deux molettes d'azur.

Jean-Baptiste Solignac (French pronunciation: [ʒɑ̃ batist sɔliɲak]; 15 March 1773 – 11 November 1850) was a French general. He fought in the French Army during the French Revolutionary Wars and the Napoleonic Wars, attaining the rank of general of division. Solignac served as the chief of staff of André Massena in Italy, and helped Massena enrich himself by looting. He fought at Magnano and was wounded at Novi in 1799. He led a brigade at Caldiero in 1805. Solignac was dismissed in 1806 for embezzling, but was reactivated to lead a brigade in the 1807 Invasion of Portugal. He was badly wounded at Vimeiro. He led a division during Massena's invasion of Portugal and fought at Fuentes de Oñoro. Dismissed again in 1811, he was again restored to command and fought at Courtrai in 1814. He was dismissed from the army in 1815 and not restored to command until 1830. He finally retired from the army in 1834 and died in 1850. SOLIGNAC is among the names inscribed under the Arc de Triomphe.

== Early career ==
Solignac was born on 15 March 1773 at Millau in the south of France. In 1790, he enlisted in the Vermandois Regiment, which later became the 61st Infantry Regiment. With the onset of the French Revolution, large numbers of aristocratic army officers left France. This opened a path of rapid promotion for the officers who remained and for members of the rank and file. Solignac joined the 2nd Battalion of Pyrénées-Orientales Volunteers formed at Montpellier and became a first lieutenant in August 1792 and then a captain in November 1792. He fought in the early campaigns of the War of the Pyrenees in the Army of the Eastern Pyrenees.

== Promotion ==
Solignac became an aide-de-camp to General Alexandre Voulland and was promoted adjutant general chef de brigade on 17 June 1794. He transferred to the 8th Military Division, headquartered in Marseille. By 1795, he was serving in Paris where he met Napoleon Bonaparte. In the successful defense of the French Directory on 13 Vendémiaire (5 October 1795), Solignac carried out Bonaparte's assignments to disperse the Sections. He then transferred to the Army of Italy where he distinguished himself. During the events leading up to and including the Battle of Tarvis in March 1797, Solignac served as chief of staff in André Massena's division. When Louis Desaix visited the Army of Italy in July 1797, he described Solignac as "very active, an excessive pillager". Massena, a famous plunderer, lined his own pockets with extorted cash and valuables from churches and towns in Italy. In Piedmont, Massena extorted 300,000 French livres and in September 1796 he stole church silver worth 310,077 francs. As his chief of staff, Solignac carried out these acquisitions for Massena.

At the Battle of Magnano on 5 April 1799, Solignac commanded a brigade in Jacques Maurice Hatry's division. The brigade consisted only of the 3rd Piedmont Line Infantry Regiment, 1,000 strong. He was promoted general of brigade on 11 April 1799. At the Battle of Novi, he was wounded and had two horses killed under him. After returning to Paris, Solignac participated in Bonaparte's Coup of 18 Brumaire (9 November 1799). When the Council of Five Hundred resisted the coup, Solignac protected Bonaparte with his own body. Soon after, Bonaparte sent him on a successful mission to the 8th Military Division to ensure that the departments of Bouches-du-Rhône, Var, and Vaucluse supported the newly-established French Consulate. Afterward, Solignac returned to the Army of Italy and Massena. He was wounded in the thigh during a skirmish at the Colle del Melogno.

== Empire ==
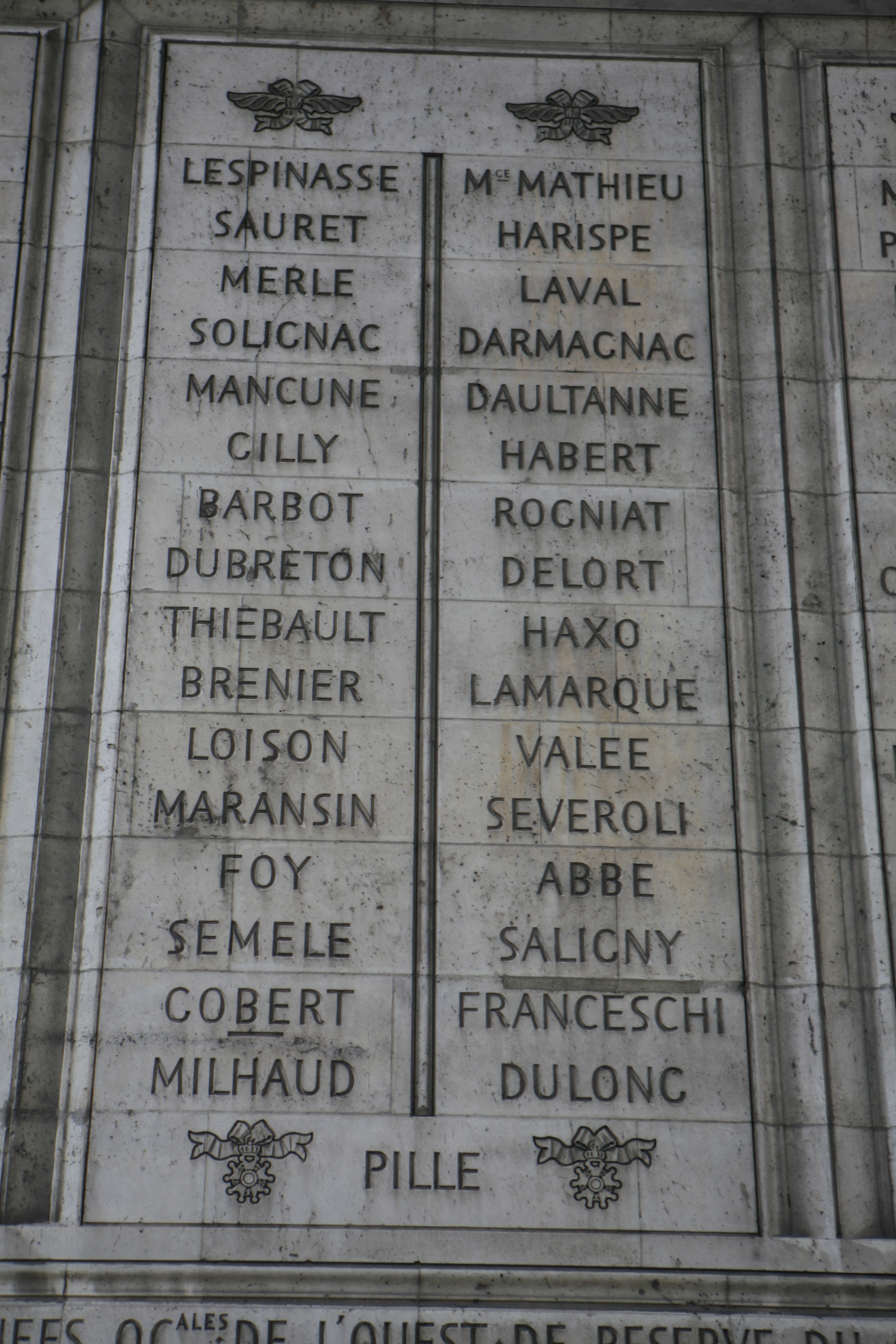
Solignac is the fourth name on Column 35.

Solignac was named a Commander of the Legion of Honor on 14 June 1804. commanded a brigade in Louis Partouneaux's Reserve Division at the Battle of Caldiero on 30 October 1805 during the War of the Third Coalition. The brigade included the 1st, 2nd, 3rd, and 4th Grenadier Battalions. The brigade was not engaged at Caldiero, but on 2 November 1805, Solignac led 6,000 French troops and 12 guns into action including his own brigade and elements of Jean-Mathieu Seras' division. In the action of Forano, Solignac crushed Karl von Hillinger's 4,000 Austrians and 14 guns. The French inflicted 400 casualties and captured 1,800 men and 12 guns while sustaining losses of 600 killed and wounded.

On 31 March 1806, Solignac was accused of embezzlement and dismissed from the army. He was restored to his former rank by Emperor Napoleon's decree on 20 April 1807. He took part in the 1807 Invasion of Portugal and commanded the French vanguard at the Battle of Evora on 29 July 1808. At the Battle of Vimiero on 21 August 1808, Solignac commanded a brigade in Louis Henri Loison's division. The brigade consisted of the 3rd battalions of the 12th Light (1,253 men), 15th Light (1,305 men), and 58th Line (1,428 men) Infantry Regiments, altogether 3,986-strong. However, from this total, the grenadier companies were removed and formed into the army's reserve. The French commander Jean-Andoche Junot attempted a frontal attack on Arthur Wellesley's center while turning the British left flank with Antoine Brennier's brigade. However, Junot saw British troops shifting to their left flank, so he sent Solignac's brigade to support Brennier. In the event, Solignac's brigade arrived in front of the British position first, attacked in column, and was repulsed. Solignac was badly wounded.

On 17 November 1808, Solignac was promoted general of division. In January 1810, he commanded the 3rd Division of Junot's VIII Corps, with 135 officers and 6,925 rank and file present under arms. This formation comprised 2 battalions each of the 15th, 47th, 70th, and 86th Line Infantry Regiments, plus the Ireland and Prussian Regiments. Solignac's troops were engaged in the Siege of Astorga in March and April 1810. The siege guns arrived on 15 April and their bombardment soon created a breach in the northwest corner of the city wall. On 21 April, the elite companies of the 47th and Ireland Regiments captured the breach and gained a small foothold. The next morning, the 2,500-man Spanish garrison surrendered; it was nearly out of ammunition. French losses in the assault were 112 killed and 294 wounded.

Solignac commanded a division in Junot's VIII Corps during Massena's 1810–1811 invasion of Portugal. Pierre Guillaume Gratien's brigade consisted of 3 battalions each of the 15th and 86th Line Infantry Regiments (118 officers, 2,352 men) and Jean Guillaume Barthélemy Thomières' brigade was made up of the 65th Line, Ireland, and Prussian Infantry Regiments (148 officers, 4,608 men). This made a division total of 266 officers and 6,960 men on 15 September 1810. This strength shrank to 213 officers and 4,340 men by 15 March 1811. Junot's corps skirmished in the Battle of Sobral on 13–14 October 1810, but this action did not involve Solignac's division. Solignac's division was present at the Battle of Fuentes de Oñoro on 3–5 May 1811. The division was made up of the same units, except the Prussian Regiment. It counted 184 officers and 4,530 men. The division was lightly engaged, losing only 2 men killed. Solignac was appointed Baron of the Empire in 1811.

On 15 November 1811, Solignac was again dismissed from the army. He pleaded with Emperor Napoleon to be readmitted to the army, and he was appointed to command a division in the I Corps on 1 January 1814. The I Corps under Nicolas Joseph Maison defended Lille against Allied forces. The Battle of Courtrai was fought on 31 March 1814. Believing that he was facing only Solignac's division, Johann von Thielmann's Saxon force attacked the French. In fact, Maison had recently been reinforced from the Antwerp garrison and he commanded 9,700 infantry, 1,360 cavalry, and 35 guns; the French routed the Saxons. At Courtrai, Solignac's division included battalion-sized detachments from the 17th, 27th, 28th, 51st, 55th, 65th, and 75th Line Infantry Regiments, a total of 3,738 officers and men. News that the war ended arrived a week later.

== Later career ==
Subsequent to Napoleon's return from Elba, Solignac was appointed to the Chamber of Representatives. After Napoleon's defeat at Waterloo, he unsuccessfully urged the other representatives to appoint Napoleon II as successor. In the second Bourbon Restoration in France, Solignac was struck from the army list and discharged without pay in 1815. He was officially retired on 11 August 1819. He was only restored to active duty on 1 September 1830 when he assumed command of the 9th Military District. He was appointed Grand Officer of the Legion of Honor on 20 April 1831. He retired again on 25 June 1834. He died on 11 November 1850. SOLIGNAC is inscribed on the west side of the Arc de Triomphe.
