= Henri Marie Lenoury =

French general

- Born: 6 November 1771; Craconville
- Died: 25 September 1839 (aged 67); Craconville
- Military career
- Allegiance: Kingdom of France, First French Republic, First French Empire
- Branch: Army
- Service years: 1793–1839
- Rank: General
- Awards: Grand Order of the Legion of Honour, Chevalier de Saint-Louis, name inscribed on the Arc de Triomphe

Henri Marie Lenoury (6 November 1771 – 25 September 1839), sometimes incorrectly called Noury, was a French general born in Craconville, France.

== Early life ==
As a student he was made a sub-lieutenant in the artillery school in Metz on 1 September 1789 and promoted to second lieutenant in the 7th regiment of foot artillery on 1 April 1791. He became first lieutenant on 6 February 1792 and captain on 26 July of the following year. He fought first in the war of 1793, in the Armée du Nord the next year, the Armée de l'Ouest for the subsequent two years and for five years after that in the armies of England and Italy.

== Later military career ==
He was battalion chief in the 8th regiment of foot artillery in 1803 and he was posted to the island of Elba until 1804 when he became squadron leader in the 1st Regiment of horse artillery.

Posted to the Armée des côtes in 1805, it was the same year that he received the Legion of Honour and commanded the artillery reserve cavalry in 1806. Promoted to Officer of the Order in 1806, he was victorious at the battle of Austerlitz and made Colonel of the 2nd regiment of foot artillery.

On 24 April 1806 he was posted to serve as Chief of Staff of the artillery of the V Corps and was wounded at Ostrołęka on 6 February 1807. In 1808 he served in the Spanish army, and achieved the rank of Brigadier-General in 1809, shortly after the capture of Sugolle, to which he contributed.

He was called to the German army on 2 September 1809 to command the Saxon artillery corps at the order of General Reynier and created Baron of the Empire around the same time. He returned to Spain on 20 January 1810 as command of the 2nd artillery of the Catalan Army (7th corps), and played an important part in the siege and capture of Figuières.

He commanded the artillery of the 7th and 12th corps of the Grande Armée in Russia and Saxony from 1 June 1812 to 24 December 1813 and witnessed the battles of Dresden, Leipzig and Hanau. He was made general of the division on 25 November 1813.

On 22 December, commanding the artillery of the 1st corps, he arranged the defence of border areas in northern France. Louis XVIII appointed him Chevalier de Saint-Louis on 29 July 1814, and Commander of the Legion of Honor on 5 August. Upon return from Elba, Napoleon employed him in the armée du Nord.

== After active service ==
In 1816 he was appointed an Inspector of Artillery, and on 1 May 1821 the king appointed him Grand Officier of the Legion of Honour and promoted him to the Advisory Committee and the General Inspectorate of Personnel and Artillery Equipment.

He was posted to the reserve of the General Staff on 15 August 1839 and died at Craconville on 25 September at the age of 67. His name is inscribed on the western part of the Arc de Triomphe.
