= Ferdinand von Wintzingerode =

German nobleman and officer (1770–1818)

Freiherr Ferdinand von Wintzingerode
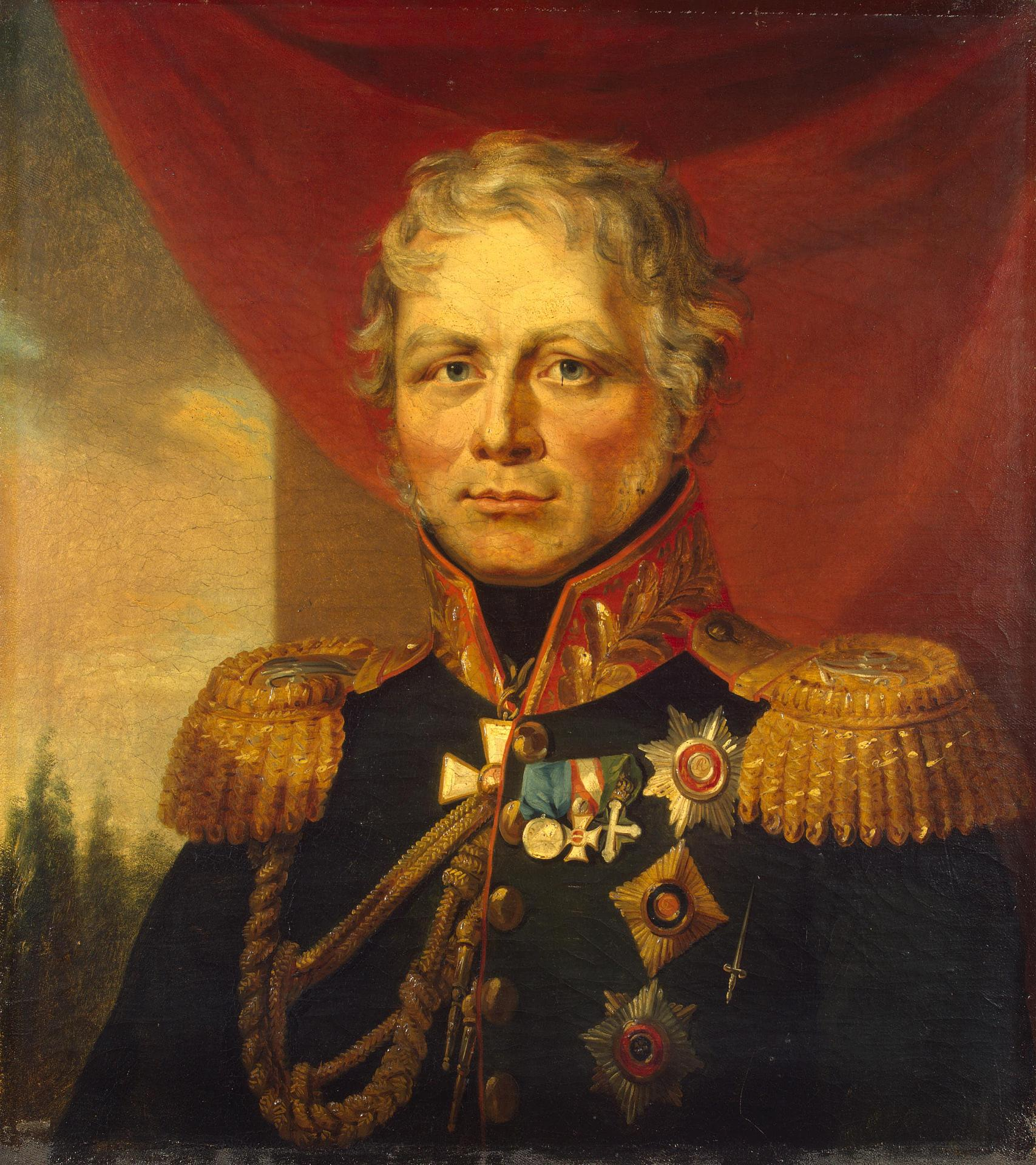
- Portrait by George Dawe, 1822–1825
- Born: 15 February 1770; Allendorf, Hesse-Kassel
- Died: 16 June 1818 (aged 48); Wiesbaden, Duchy of Nassau
- Military career
- Allegiance: Austrian Empire; Russian Empire
- Branch: Army
- Service years: 1792–1814
- Rank: Field marshal (Austria); General of the cavalry (Russia)
- Commands: Russian Advance Guard Corps
- Conflicts: See battles: French Revolutionary Wars; War of the First Coalition; Flanders campaign; Italian campaigns of the French Revolutionary Wars; Napoleonic Wars; War of the Third Coalition; Battle of Dürenstein; War of the Fifth Coalition; Battle of Aspern–Essling (WIA); French invasion of Russia; War of the Sixth Coalition; Battle of Lützen (1813); Battle of Leipzig; Battle of Hoogstraten; Battle of Craonne; Battle of Laon; Battle of Saint-Dizier
- Awards: Order of Saint George; Grand Cross of the Military Order of Maria Theresa

Ferdinand Karl Friedrich Freiherr von Wintzingerode (or Ferdinand Fyodorovich Wintzingerode; (Note: Russian: Фердинанд Фёдорович Винцингероде, romanized: Ferdinand Fyodorovich Vintsingerode.) 15 February 1770, Allendorf – 16 June 1818, Wiesbaden) was a German nobleman and officer in several different armies of the Napoleonic Wars, finally ending up as a general in the Imperial Russian Army and fighting in the War of the Sixth Coalition against the French invasion of Russia and the subsequent campaigns in Germany and France. He appears in Tolstoy's War and Peace.

== Early life ==
Ferdinand von Wintzingerode was born into a noble family of Thuringia. His father, baron Wilhelm Levin Ernst von Wintzingerode (1738–1781), owned the Unterhof seigneurial domain near Kirchohmfeld.

== Military career ==
Ferdinand's first military service was in the Hessian Army, then as a volunteer in the Austrian army in the war against the Netherlands. He took part in the 1792–93 campaigns against the French and, after the Treaty of Campo Formio on 17 October 1797, he was offered a post as major in the Imperial Russian Army. In 1800 the Austrian army gave him permission to fight in the war in Italy.

=== Napoleonic Wars ===
He became a major general and general aide-de-camp to Alexander I of Russia in 1802 and was entrusted with diplomatic missions over the following years. Also, in 1805 in Berlin, he negotiated with Austria and Great Britain on behalf of the Prussians to form the three nations into an alliance against France. On 11 November 1805, at Dürenstein, he received the Order of St. George. He returned to the Austrian army in 1809, where he was made field marshal. He led the advance guard of the first brigade of general Bellegarde's army on 20 May at Aspern, where he was wounded in the right leg.

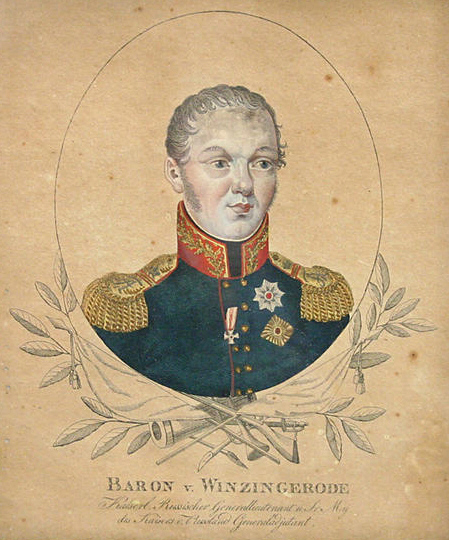
Lithograph, c. 1820

He returned to the Russian army in 1812 to face the French invasion of Russia. In it he was made lieutenant general and grand cross of the Military Order of Maria Theresa. On 21 October 1812 he led a unit of Cossacks trying to reach the Kremlin by challenging several French posts at the head of a Cossack unit, but he and his aide-de-camp Narichzin were captured by lieutenant Leleu de Maupertuis of the 5th Imperial Guard Chasseurs Regiment. He was freed by general Alexander Chernyshyov and led the Russian Advance Guard Corps under Kutuzov fighting at the Battle of Kalisz in February 1813. He fought at the battle of Lützen before being promoted to General of the cavalry at the battle of Leipzig in 1813. He followed the army of the North into Holland, fighting at Hoogstraten, then rejoined the Prussian army under Blücher and fought in the Six Days' Campaign in 1814; his forces were involved in the next engagements of Craonne, Laon and Saint-Dizier as well.

== Family ==
On 19 September 1801, he married the Polish countess Hélène Rostworowska (1783–1829), with whom he had one son.

== Bibliography ==
- "Винцингероде, Фердинанд Федорович" . Brockhaus and Efron Encyclopedic Dictionary (in Russian). 1906.
- Demme, Hans; Kabisch, Karl-Heinz (1986). Ferdinand Freiherr von Wintzingerode, russischer General und deutscher Patriot. Sonderausgabe der Eichsfelder Heimathefte (in German). OCLC 18559061.
- Prochaska, Walter. Ferdinand, Freiherr von Wintzingerode. Ein General der Befreiungskriege (in German). ISBN 3-929413-35-3.
- von Wintzingerode, Wilhelm Clothar Freiherr (1902). General der Kavallerie Ferdinand Freiherr v. Wintzingerode, Ein Lebensbild aus den napoleonischen Kriegen (in German). OCLC 1296121863.
- v. Wintzingerode, Eberhard (1848). Stammbaum der Familie von Wintzingerode mit biographischen Erläuterungen (in German). Göttingen. OCLC 945894027.
- v. Wintzingerode, Heinrich Jobst Graf (2004). Recht tun behält sein Preis allzeit. Die Geschichte der Familie Wintzingerode und der Burg Bodenstein. Bodunger Beiträge (in German). Vol. 8. ISBN 3-00-013996-6.
