= François Roguet =

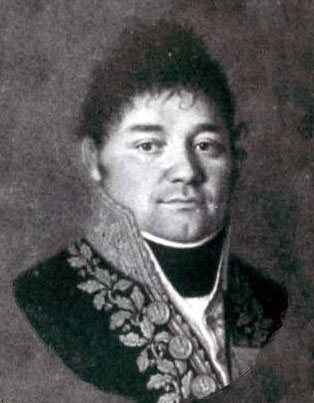
- François Roguet
- Born: 12 November 1770; Toulouse, France
- Died: 4 December 1846 (aged 76) Paris, France
- Allegiance: Kingdom of France; France
- Branch: Infantry
- Service years: (Kingdom of France) 1789–1792 (France) 1792–1814
- Rank: General of Division
- Conflicts: War of the First Coalition; Battle of Rivoli; War of the Second Coalition; Battle of Verona; War of the Third Coalition; Battle of Elchingen; War of the Fourth Coalition; Battle of Jena; Siege of Magdeburg; Battle of Eylau; Battle of Guttstadt-Deppen; War of the Fifth Coalition; Battle of Aspern-Essling; Battle of Wagram; Peninsular War; War of the Sixth Coalition; Battle of Krasnoi; Battle of Lützen; Battle of Bautzen; Battle of Dresden; Battle of Leipzig; Battle of Hoogstraten; Battle of Courtrai; Belgian Revolution
- Awards: Légion d'Honneur, CC 1804
- Other work: Count of the Empire, 1814

François Roguet (French pronunciation: [fʁɑ̃swa ʁɔɡɛ]; 12 November 1770 – 4 December 1846) became a French division commander in the Imperial Guard during the Napoleonic Wars. He enlisted in the French Royal Army in 1789. His regiment was assigned to the Army of Italy in 1792 and fought in the Italian campaigns of the French Revolutionary Wars. He commanded a battalion at the Battle of Rivoli in 1797. He was badly wounded at the Battle of Verona in 1799. For suppressing partisans he was promoted to command an infantry regiment.

Promoted general of brigade in 1803, Roguet fought at Elchingen and Scharnitz in 1805. He led his brigade at Jena and Magdeburg in 1806 and at Eylau and Guttstadt in 1807. He led a Young Guard brigade at Aspern-Essling and Wagram. He was in Spain in 1808 and 1810–1811. In the latter year he received promotion to general of division. In 1812 he directed the Young Guard at Battle of Krasnoi. In 1813 he led the Old Guard division at Lützen and Bautzen and a Young Guard division at Dresden and Leipzig. In 1814 he led a Young Guard division at Hoogstraten and Courtrai. In 1815 he led Imperial Guard troops at Ligny and Waterloo. After a period of retirement, he led a French division that intervened in the Belgian Revolution. His surname is one of the names inscribed under the Arc de Triomphe, on Column 26.

== Career ==
In September 1800, the 33rd Line Infantry Demi-brigade was inspected in Paris by Napoleon Bonaparte. Only 37 officers and 295 soldiers remained of the unit and many men were barefoot and in ragged uniforms, because their clothing allotment had not been delivered. Napoleon circulated among the soldiers, recognizing veterans and recalling old victories. He ended the review by promoting Roguet the new commander and charging him to rebuild the unit to its former glory. The ranks were soon filled with apprehended draft evaders, recruits rejected by the cavalry and coastal artillery, deserters released from prison, and conscripts from the Eure department.
