= Deux-Nèthes =

Former French department (1795–1814)

Department of Deux-Nèthes Département des Deux-Nèthes (French) Departement Twee Neten (Dutch)
- 1795–1814
- Location of Deux-Nèthes in France (1812)
- Status: Department of the French First Republic and the French First Empire
- Chef-lieu: Antwerp; 51°13′N 4°24′E
- Official languages: French
- Common languages: Dutch
- History
  - Creation: 1 October 1795
  - Arrondissement of Bréda incorporated: 15 May 1810
  - Treaty of Paris, disestablished: 30 May 1814

Area
- 1812: 4,153 km^{2} (1,603 sq mi)

Population
  - 1812: 367,184
Preceded by	Succeeded by
Duchy of Brabant; Generality Lands	Antwerp Province; North Brabant
- Today part of: Belgium; Netherlands

Deux-Nèthes (French: [dø.nɛt], Dutch: Twee Neten) was a department of the French First Republic and of the First French Empire in present-day Belgium and the Netherlands. It was named after two branches of the river Nete (Grote Nete and Kleine Nete). The southern part of its territory corresponds more or less with the present-day Belgian province of Antwerp. It was created on 1 October 1795, when the Austrian Netherlands were officially annexed by the French Republic. Its territory was the northern part of the former duchy of Brabant. After the annexation of the Kingdom of Holland in 1810, the department was expanded with the western half of the present-day Dutch province of North Brabant, itself historically part of the Duchy of Brabant.

Deux-Nèthes within the northern French Empire (1811)

The Chef-lieu of the department was Antwerp (Anvers in French). The department was subdivided into the following four arrondissements and cantons (with French names):

- Anvers: Anvers (4 cantons), Brecht, Ekeren, Kontich, Wilrijk and Zandhoven.
- Bréda: Bergues-sur-le-Zon, Bréda, Ginneken, Oosterhout, Oudenbosch, Rosendael and Zevenbergen.
- Malines: Duffel, Heyst-sur-la-Montagne, Lierre, Malines (2 cantons) and Puers.
- Turnhout: Arendonk, Herentals, Hoogstraten, Mol, Turnhout and Westerlo.

After Napoleon was defeated in 1814, the department became part of the United Kingdom of the Netherlands as the provinces of Antwerp and North Brabant.

== Administration ==
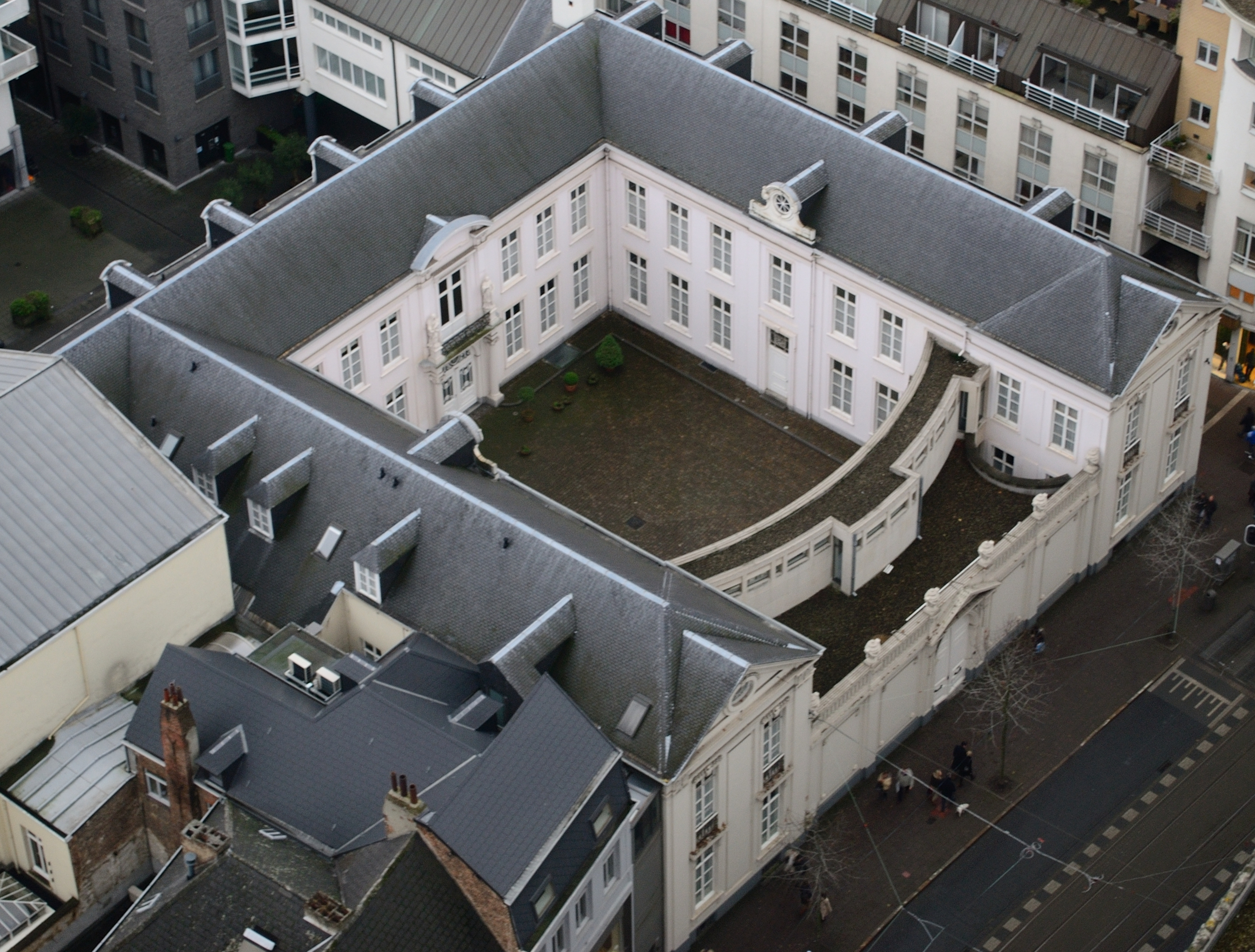
The Bishop's Palace in Antwerp city was the seat of the prefect

=== Prefects ===
The Prefect was the highest state representative in the department.

Term start	Term end	Office holder
2 March 1800	29 July 1805	Charles Joseph Fortuné d'Herbouville
29 July 1805	29 March 1809	Charles Cochon de Lapparent
29 March 1809	12 March 1813	Marc René Marie Voyer de Paulmy d'Argenson
12 March 1813	30 May 1814	Jacques Fortunat Savoye-Rollin

=== Secretaries General ===
The Secretary General was the deputy to the Prefect.

Term start	Term end	Office holder
26 April 1800	?? ?? 1805	Jacques Ambroise Rialle
?? ?? 1805	30 May 1814	Jacques-Chrisostôme Jullien d'Aguilhan

=== Subprefects of Anvers ===
The office of Subprefect of Anvers was held by the Prefect until 1811.

Term start	Term end	Office holder
14 January 1811	14 February 1812	Guislain De Loose
14 February 1812	30 May 1814	Baillet

=== Subprefects of Bréda ===
This subprefecture was created in 1810 and suppressed a month later.

Term start	Term end	Office holder
5 May 1810	15 May 1810	Peppe

=== Subprefects of Malines ===
Term start	Term end	Office holder
25 April 1800	8 July 1802	Jean Henri Pierre Van den Branden de Riette
8 July 1802	30 May 1814	Devargny

=== Subprefects of Turnhout ===
Term start	Term end	Office holder
25 April 1800	30 May 1814	Mesmaekers
