= Johann von Thielmann =

Saxon general (1765–1824)

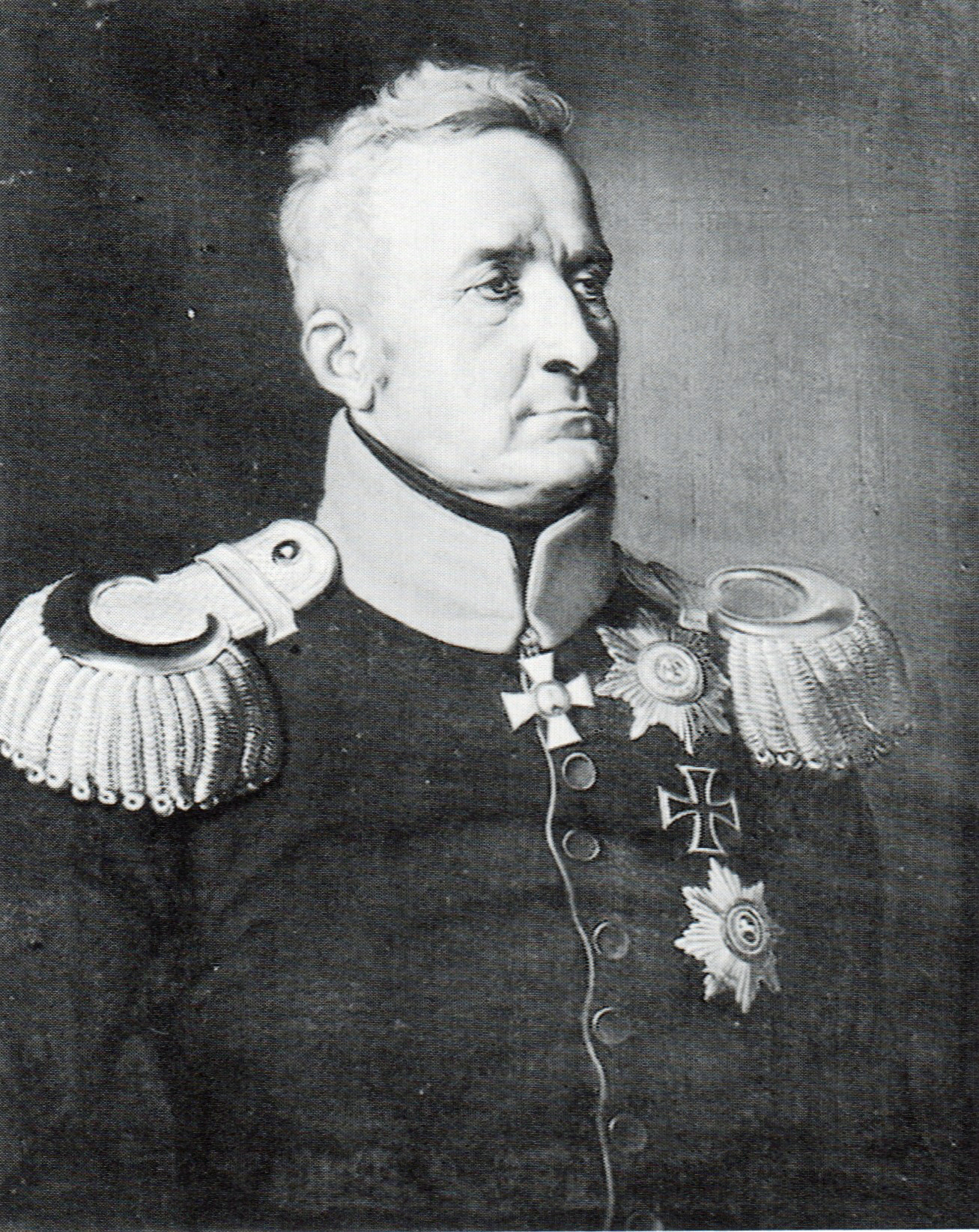
- Johann Adolf Freiherr von Thielmann
- Born: 27 April 1765; Dresden, Electorate of Saxony
- Died: 10 October 1824 (aged 59); Coblenz, Kingdom of Prussia
- Military career
- Allegiance: Kingdom of Saxony; Kingdom of Prussia
- Branch: Saxon Army; Prussian Army
- Service years: 1782–1824
- Rank: General of the Cavalry
- Conflicts: French Revolutionary Wars; Napoleonic Wars; War of the Fourth Coalition; Siege of Danzig (1807); Battle of Friedland; War of the Fifth Coalition; Battle of Gefrees; French Invasion of Russia; Battle of Borodino; War of the Sixth Coalition; Raid at Altenburg; War of the Seventh Coalition; Waterloo campaign; Battle of Wavre

Johann Adolf, Freiherr von Thielmann (27 April 1765 – 10 October 1824) was a Saxon general who served with Saxony, Prussia and France during the Napoleonic Wars. (Note: His name is also spelled Johann von Thielemann.)

== Biography ==
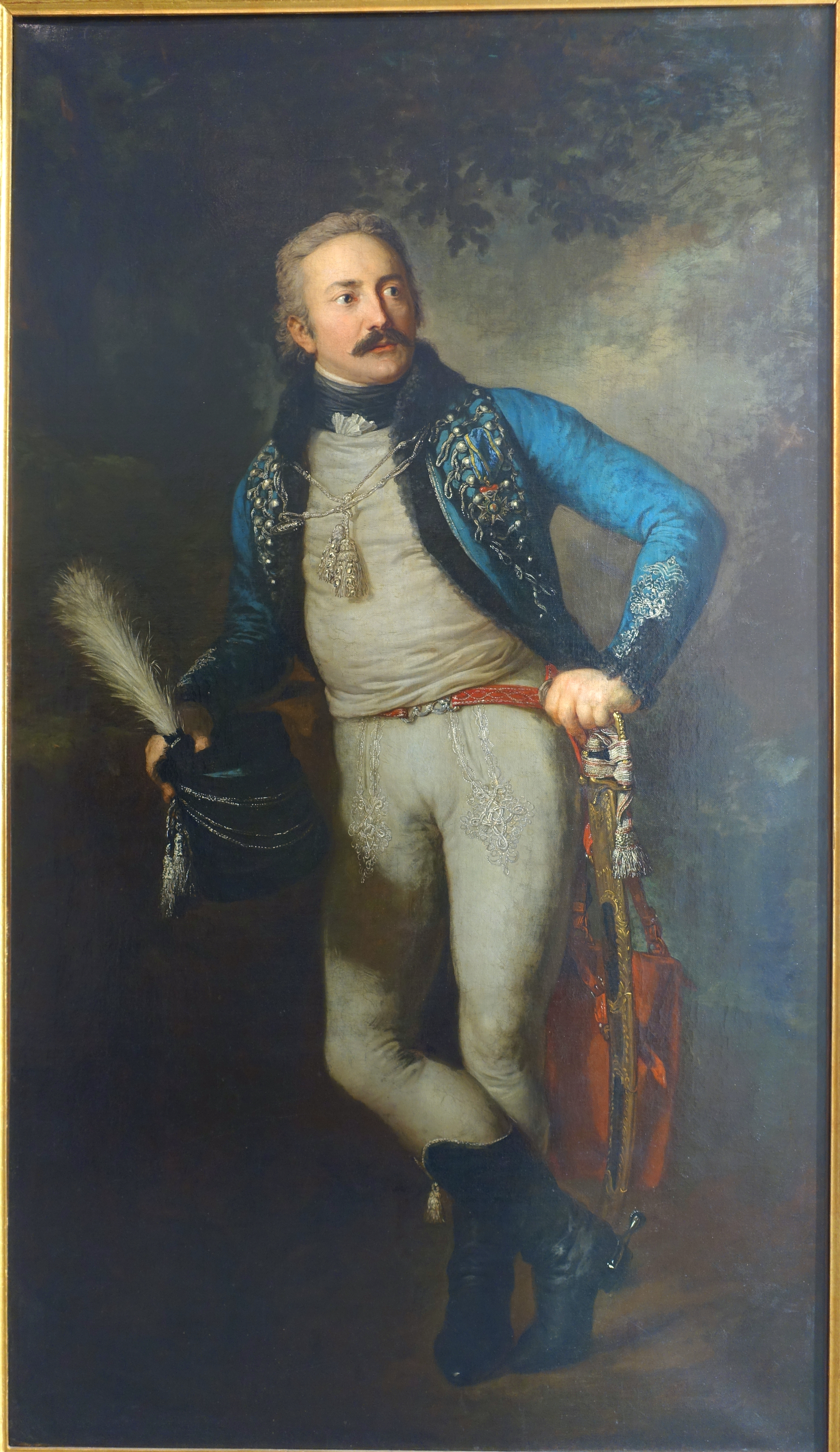
Johann Adolf Freiherr von Thielmann (painting by Anton Graff)

Thielmann was born at Dresden. Entering the Saxon cavalry in 1782, he saw service against the French in the Rhine campaigns and served on the side of Prussia in the Jena campaign. After the disaster of Jena, Thielmann was sent by Saxony as ambassador to Napoleon I, became his ardent admirer, and did much to bring about the Franco-Saxon alliance. Thielmann accompanied the Saxon contingent which fought at the siege of Danzig and at Friedland.

In 1809, as colonel of Free-Corps, he opposed the advance of the Austrians into Saxony, and was rewarded for his services with the grade of major-general, further promotion to lieutenant-general following in 1810. As commander of the Saxon Heavy Cavalry Brigade he took part in the advance on Moscow two years later, and his exceptional bravery at Borodino attracted the attention of Napoleon, who took Thielmann into his own suite. His own sovereign at the same time made him Freiherr.

In the war of the Sixth Coalition, Thielmann, now von Thielmann, took a prominent part. As governor of Torgau, by his king's orders he at first observed the strictest neutrality, but on receipt of an order to hand over the fortress to the French he resigned his command and, accompanied by his staff officer Aster, joined the Coalition. As a Russian general he was employed in reorganizing the Saxon army after Leipzig, and in 1814 he commanded the Saxon corps operating in the Low Countries.

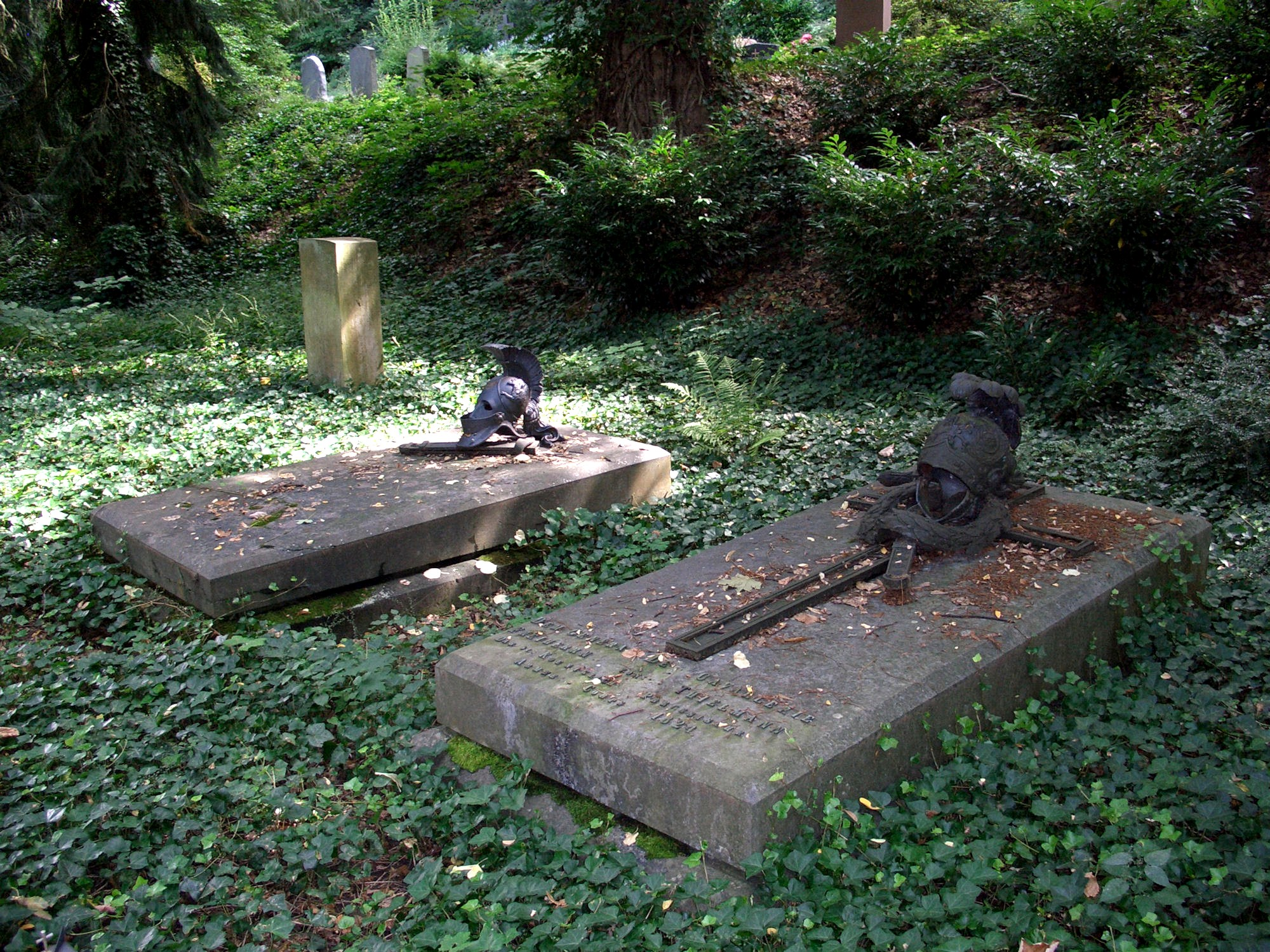
Graves of three Prussian generals at the cemetery of Coblenz — von Thielmann's is in the foreground to the right

Early in the following year he became a lieutenant-general in the Prussian service, and in command of the III Corps (with Carl von Clausewitz as his chief of staff) he took part in the Waterloo campaign. (Note: Carl von Clausewitz, author of the influential book On War, was appointed von Thielmann's chief of staff.) From the field of Ligny he retired with the rest of Blücher's army on Wavre, and when the other corps marched towards Waterloo, von Thielmann defended this movement against Grouchy, fighting in the Battle of Wavre (18–19 June 1815), thus contributing materially to the victory at Waterloo.

Later in life, he was a corps commander at Münster (VII Corps) and at Coblenz (VIII Corps), and at the latter place he died in 1824, as a general of cavalry.
