= Treaty of Troyes (1814) =

Military agreement between Austria, Russia and Prussia

- Signed: 22 February 1814
- Location: Troyes, France
- Parties: Russian Empire; (Kingdom of Prussia) Prussia; Austrian Empire

The Treaty of Troyes was an agreement of 22 February 1814 by Austria, Russia and Prussia following a council of war with senior generals, Tsar Alexander I of Russia and King Frederick William III of Prussia. The treaty determined the movements of the Austrian and Prussian-Russian armies following a series of defeats during the invasion of north-east France (part of the War of the Sixth Coalition). Despite dissent from the Russian and Prussian leaders, Austrian General Karl Philipp, Prince of Schwarzenberg secured support for a withdrawal ahead of the French forces of Emperor Napoleon I who was seeking to bring the allies to battle.

The allied armies separated with the Army of Silesia under Field Marshal Gebhard Leberecht von Blücher heading north to join with other allied forces. Napoleon failed to defeat him at the 9 March Battle of Laon and Blücher captured Paris on 30–31 March; shortly afterwards Napoleon abdicated the French throne and the war ended.

== Background ==
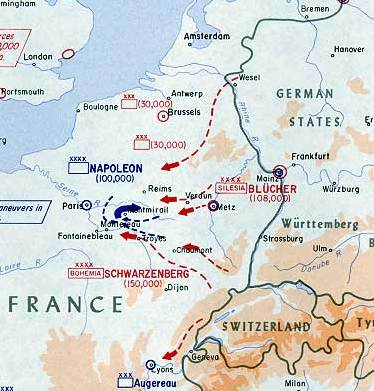
Opening actions of the North-East France campaign 1814

The War of the Sixth Coalition was part of the Napoleonic Wars in which allied forces sought to defeat France and unseat Emperor Napoleon I. In January 1814 the allied nations of Austria, Prussia and Russia - who had decisively defeated a French force at the Battle of Leipzig in October 1813 - launched an invasion of the French Empire. This was carried out by three armies: the Army of Bohemia composed of Austrians under Field Marshal Karl Philipp, Prince of Schwarzenberg; the Army of Silesia, a Prussian-Russian force under Field Marshal Gebhard Leberecht von Blücher and the Army of the North, a Prussian-Russian-Dutch-Scandinavian force under Generals Ferdinand von Wintzingerode, Friedrich Wilhelm Freiherr von Bülow and Prince Bernadotte.

The Army of the North remained fairly static whilst Blücher advanced into France on the northern flank and Schwarzenberg on the southern. Napoleon defeated Blücher's advance in the Six Days' Campaign of 10–15 February, forcing the Prussians to withdraw, before he was compelled to deal with the Austrian forces. He defeated the Austrians at the 18 February Battle of Montereau on 18 February after which they withdrew to Troyes.

No sooner had Schwarzenberg's 50,000-strong army entered Troyes than it was threatened by Napoleon, who reached Chartres on the 22 February. Blücher's force at this time were at Sommesous but he moved to join a Russian contingent at Méry-sur-Seine. Napoleon switched his attention back to Blücher, intending to keep the allied armies separate. Arriving at Méry-sur-Seine he launched an assault across the River Seine bridge. After some close quarters fighting the village was burned to the ground and Napoleon took the badly damaged bridge. A set-piece battle looked set to decide matters between the French and the Prussian-Russian force but Napoleon declined to enter into one, content to resume his march on Troyes. It is believed that Napoleon sought to inflict a decisive defeat on the Austrians, hoping to persuade them to leave the coalition.

== Treaty ==
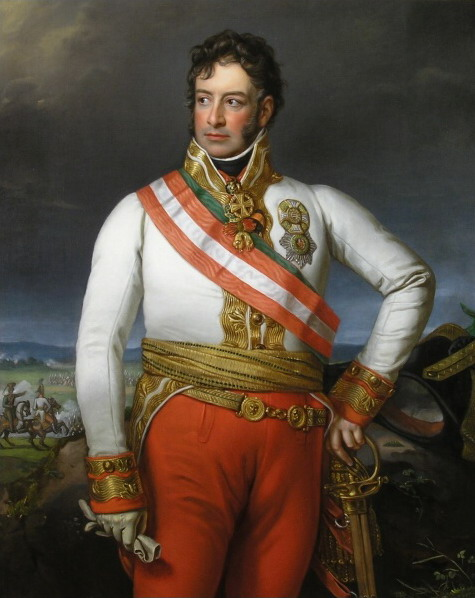
Karl Philipp, Prince of Schwarzenberg

A council of war met at Troyes on 22 February 1814 attended by Tsar Alexander I of Russia and King Frederick William III of Prussia as well as the senior allied generals to determine their next actions. Schwarzenberg feared, perhaps justifiably, that his force was insufficient to defeat Napoleon and recommended a withdrawal. This course of action was opposed by Blücher and General Diebitsch as well as Alexander and Frederick William who wished to engage the French in the field. However, in the end a general withdrawal and separation of the two armies was agreed.

The treaty was put into immediate effect and orders issued to the allied armies. Napoleon hoped to engage the Austrian army near to Troyes on 23 February, but the withdrawal deprived him of the decisive battle that he sought.

Some commentators suggested that the decision to withdraw was made because the allied generals could not agree on a suitable battlefield near to Troyes on which to engage the French. However, it is considered likely that they instead feared losing a decisive engagement upon which hinged the future of Europe: either in the final defeat of Napoleon or the collapse of the Sixth Coalition.

== Aftermath ==
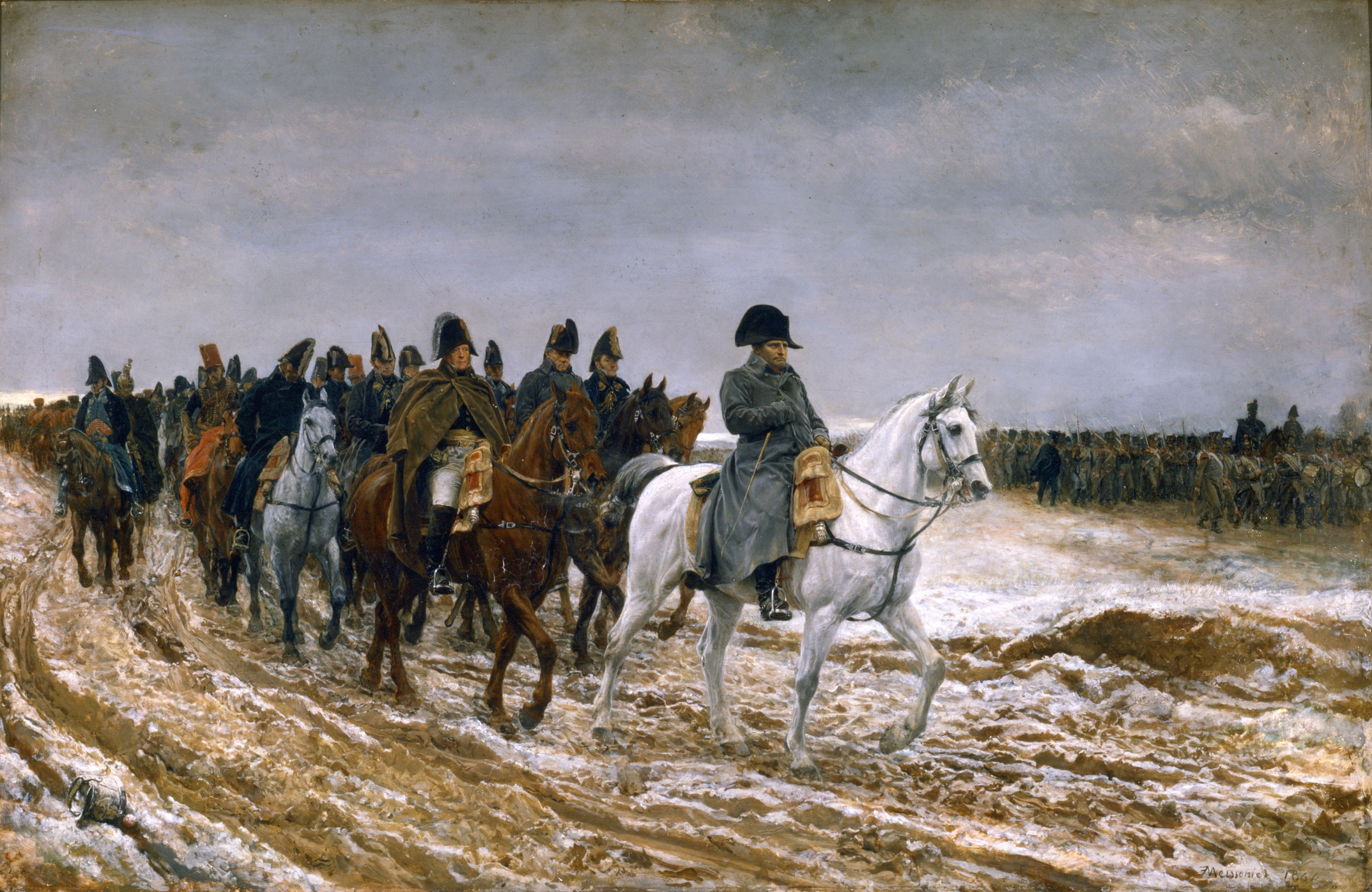
Napoleon retreats after the Battle of Laon

After the signing of the treaty, Blücher moved his forces north to join forces with Bülow and Wintzingerode. Some of Bernadotte's troops also moved to support him. Blücher was therefore strong enough to consider resuming the invasion. Napoleon occupied Troyes on 24 February and, leaving a force under Macdonald and Oudinot to observe the Austrians, moved north again against Blücher.

Napoleon's attack on Blücher at the 9 March Battle of Laon was unsuccessful and he withdrew to Reims, where he defeated a Russian force on 12–13 March. Macdonald and Oudinot fell back before the Austrian march on Provins but Schwarzenberg decided to withdraw again to Troyes. Napoleon engaged him in the indecisive Battle of Arcis-sur-Aube of 20 March and was forced to withdraw ahead of a renewed advance. Napoleon was now too weak to fight either of the allied armies and Blücher captured Paris on 30–31 March. Napoleon retreated to Fontainebleau where he agreed to abdicate on 13 April, bringing the war to a close.
