= Charles-Joseph Christiani =

Baron Charles-Joseph Christiani (French pronunciation: [ʃaʁl ʒozɛf kʁistjani]; 27 February 1772 – 6 April 1840) was a French Army Maréchal de camp who served during the Napoleonic Wars.

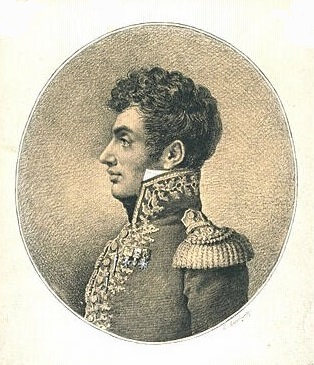

== Career ==
Born in Strasbourg, Christiani was originally a private in the French Revolutionary Army and rose to high rank during the Napoleonic Wars (1803–1815). He was promoted to colonel on 5 June and particularly distinguished himself at the 1809 Battle of Wagram and on the 14 February 1810 Napoleon created him a baron. On 30 August 1813 he was promoted to Brigadier general.

During the 1814 campaign in north-east France at the Battle of Bar-sur-Aube on 27 February 1814, Christiani, at the head of a division of the Old Guard, attacked and drove back the Austrians and routed the troops of General Kleist. This feat of arms is quoted by Napoleon in his letters to the Empress. Christiani then defended Montmartre during the 1814 Battle of Paris against troops of the Sixth Coalition.

He died at Montargis in north-central France on 6 April 1840.

== Decorations ==
Legion of Honour

- Légionnaire (25 prairial XII year)
- Officier (7 May 1811)
- Commandant (17 May 1813)
- Grand officier de la Légion d'honneur (17 May 1813)

== Legacy ==
The Rue Christiani in the 18th arrondissement of Paris is named after him.

== Arms ==
Arms	Blazon
	Arms of Baron Christiani of the First French Empire (Decreed: 3 December 1809 by letters patent of 14 February 1810, Paris
	Three chevrons or. on an az. field, franc quarter sword arg. on gu. Livery: yellow, blue and red.
