= Medal "For the Capture of Paris" =

Russian Empire campaign medal

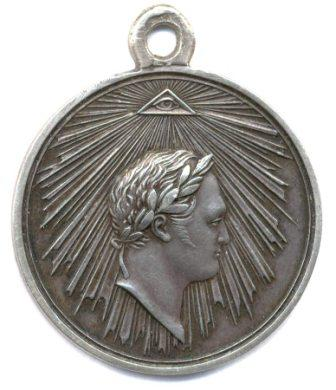
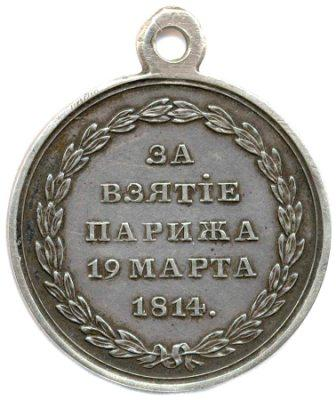
- obverse reverse
- Type: Campaign medal
- Awarded for: Participation in the 1814 French campaign
- Country: Russian Empire
- Eligibility: Imperial Russian Army personnel
- Status: No longer awarded
- Established: 30 August 1814 by Alexander I
- First award: 19 March 1826
- Final award: 1 May 1832

Highlights
- Total: c. 150,000
- Ribbon of the Medal "For the Capture of Paris"

The Medal "For the Capture of Paris on 19 March 1814" (Russian: медаль «За взятие Парижа 19 марта 1814 года») was a campaign medal of the Russian Empire. It was established on 30 August 1814 by decree of Emperor Alexander I of Russia.

The medal was intended for those who participated in the taking of Paris in 1814, from soldiers to generals. The medal was not awarded until 1826 as after the restoration of the French monarchy Alexander I considered it undiplomatic to award a medal that would remind France of the defeat, and it was the next Emperor, Nicholas I, who gave orders for its issue in March 1826. More than 160,000 medals were produced in total.
