= Freiwilliges Feldjäger-Korps von Schmidt =

- Active: 11/1813-5/1814
- Country: Prussia
- Branch: Prussian Army
- Type: riflemen
- Size: company
- Nickname(s): "Schmidtsche Feldjäger"
- Engagements: Battle of Paris

Commanders
- Notable commanders: August v. Göckel; Frohwalt von Schmidt

Freiwilliges Feldjäger-Korps von Schmidt (English: Volunteer Riflemen Corps von Schmidt, or perhaps more naturally, von Schmidt's Volunteer Corps of Riflemen) was a group of Prussian volunteer infantrymen that formed in late 1813 when the Grand Duchy of Baden joined the cause of the Allies after the Battle of Leipzig. Most of the men were students of the university of Heidelberg. It was founded on the initiative of a former Prussian officer, August v. Göckel, who until 1807 had been a Sekonde-Lieutenant in the Prussian Feldjäger-Regiment (English: Rifle Regiment). In mid November 1813, v. Göckel, who had been severely injured by falling off his horse, had to resign, and handed the command over to Frohwalt von Schmidt, a student from the Lower Rhine, who henceforth was to lend his name to the corps.

In contrast to the Baden Freiwilliges Jägerkorps zu Pferd (English: Horse Volunteer Corps), the Schmidtschen Feldjäger (English: Schmidt's riflemen), as they were also called, did not receive official recognition by the Grand Duke of Baden. Thus these volunteers who equipped and armed themselves, had to provide for their own supplies as well, which caused them to be accused at times as plunderers without discipline. However, their proven value in combat and the diplomatic skills of von Schmidt always regained them the goodwill of their superiors.

The corps rose to a strength of 43 volunteers, and on 17 December 1813 attached itself to the volunteer detachment of the Fusilier battalion of the Prussian 1. Garde-Regiment zu Fuß (1st Foot Guards), in whose ranks it took part in the 1814 winter campaign in France. Having been reduced to 22 men, due to losses in combat and through illness, it also saw action in the Battle of Paris on 30 March 1814.

In mid May 1814, the corps was dissolved, and the volunteers returned home or to Heidelberg.

== Uniforms and Equipment ==
The volunteers had dark green double breasted coats with red collars and cuffs. They wore showy pale blue trousers, decorated on the front with black knots in the Hungarian style. They wore black leather boots and their belts were coated with black wax. The corps was equipped with privately purchased rifles of different calibers. In December 1813, the Baden cockade was replaced with the Prussian one.

== Sources ==
- Vereinigung der Freunde des Wehrgeschichtlichen Museums Rastatt: Unter dem Greifen. Rastatt 1984
- Carl von Reinhard: Geschichte des Königlich Preußischen Ersten Garde-Regiments zu Fuß. Potsdam 1858
