= Campaign in north-east France (1814) =

Part of the Napoleonic Wars

- Part of the War of the Sixth Coalition
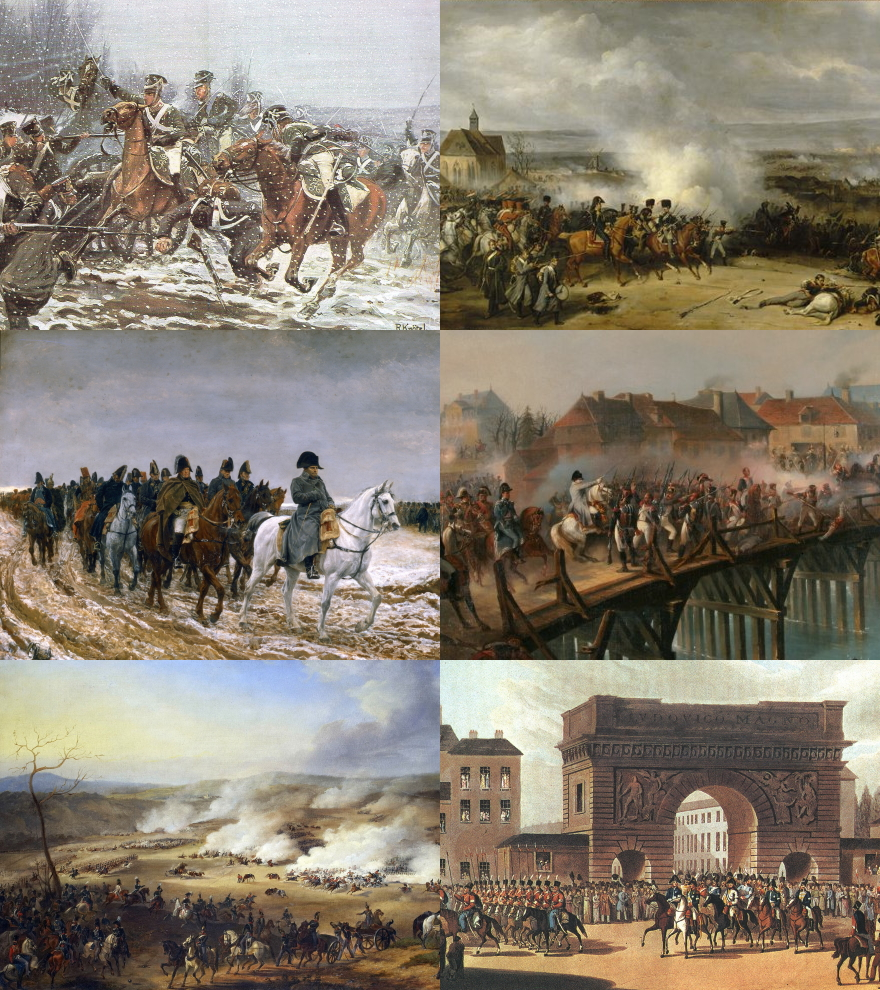
- War of the Sixth Coalition France 1814 Click an image to load the battle. Left to right, top to bottom: La Rothière, Laubressel, Laon, Arcis-sur-Aube, Fère-Champenoise, Paris
Date	January–March 1814
Location	North-East French Empire
Result	Coalition victory See Aftermath

Belligerents
France	Russia; Austria; United Kingdom; Prussia; Baden; Bavaria; Netherlands; Saxony; Württemberg; Sweden

Commanders and leaders
(First French Empire) Napoleon (First French Empire) Louis-Alexandre Berthier (First French Empire) Pierre Augereau (First French Empire) François Joseph Lefebvre (First French Empire) Jacques MacDonald (First French Empire) Auguste de Marmont (surrendered) (First French Empire) Bon-Adrien Jeannot de Moncey (First French Empire) Édouard Mortier (First French Empire) Michel Ney (First French Empire) Nicolas Oudinot (First French Empire) Claude Victor-Perrin (First French Empire) Emmanuel Grouchy (First French Empire) Etienne Maurice Gerard	(Russian Empire) Alexander I (British Empire) Lord Robert Stewart (Austrian Empire) Francis I (Austrian Empire) Karl von Schwarzenberg (Kingdom of Prussia) Frederick William III (Kingdom of Prussia) Gebhard Leberecht von Blücher (Kingdom of Prussia) Friedrich Wilhelm von Bülow (Kingdom of Prussia) Ludwig Yorck von Wartenburg (Kingdom of Prussia) Friedrich Kleist (Russian Empire) Barclay de Tolly (Russian Empire) Ferdinand von Wintzingerode (Russian Empire) Peter Wittgenstein (Russian Empire) Zakhar Dmitrievich Olsufiev (POW) (Russian Empire) Fabian Gottlieb von der Osten-Sacken (Russian Empire) Peter Kaptzevich (Russian Empire) Emmanuel Saint-Priest (Kingdom of Bavaria) Karl Philipp von Wrede (Kingdom of Württemberg) William I (Sweden) Crown prince Bernadotte

Strength
71,012	370,000–405,000 (Note: Hodgson gives no size for the Army of the North but estimates the Austrian Grand Army have 10,000 and the Army of Silesia 25,000 more men than Maud (Hodgson 1841, p. 504).)

Casualties and losses
150,000	166,000

War of the Sixth Coalition:
Campaign in north-east France
Napoleon in command
Napoleon not in command

The 1814 campaign in north-east France was Napoleon's final campaign of the War of the Sixth Coalition. Following their victory at Leipzig in 1813, the Austrian, Prussian, Russian, and other German armies of the Sixth Coalition invaded France. Despite the disproportionate forces in favour of the Coalition, Napoleon managed to inflict several defeats, the Six Days' Campaign being the most well-known. However, the campaign ended in total defeat for Napoleon as the Coalition kept advancing towards Paris. Napoleon was out of position to defend the capital, which capitulated in late March 1814. When Napoleon proposed the army march on Paris, his Marshals decided to unanimously overrule Napoleon in order to save the city from further destruction. As a result, the victorious Coalition negotiated the Treaty of Paris, under which Napoleon was exiled to the island of Elba and the borders of France were returned to where they had been in 1792.

== Background ==
Following defeats in the Wars of the Fourth and Fifth Coalitions, Prussia and Austria were forcibly allied with France during the Russian Campaign. When this campaign resulted in the destruction of Napoleon's Grande Armée, the two states took advantage of the situation by forming a Sixth Coalition against France. The retreat from Russia led to a German campaign; following some early successes, Napoleon was decisively defeated at Leipzig and forced to retreat to France. Most European countries then turned against Napoleon and started to invade France.

== Situation ==
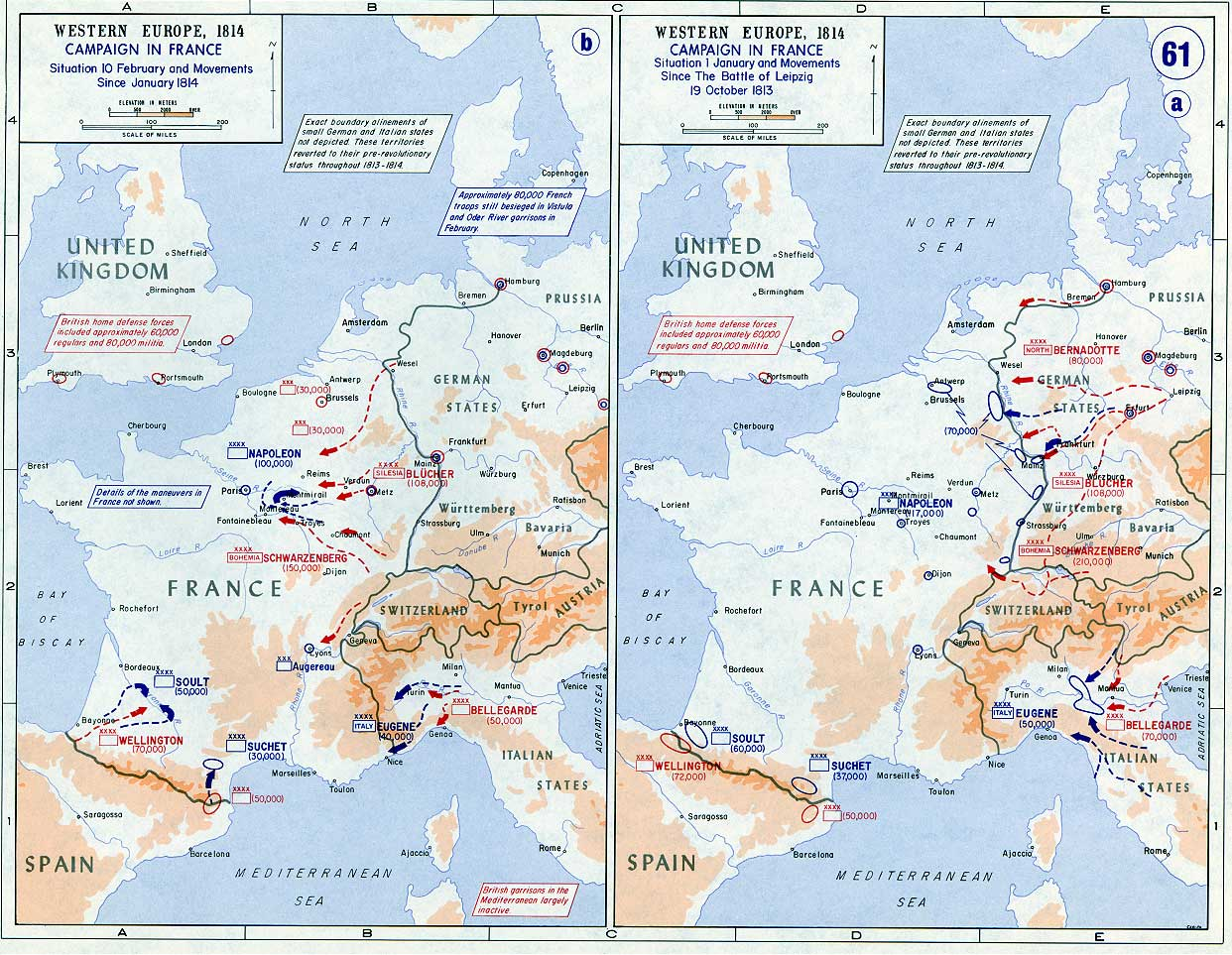
Strategic situation in 1814

When the last French troops had crossed west of the Rhine, the Coalition members disagreed on the next action. Russian Emperor Alexander I wanted the Coalition armies to push on, but everyone was weary of the war, and many felt that it would be unwise to push Napoleon and the French nation to extremes. Hence there was a prolonged halt, while the Coalition tried to negotiate with Napoleon. During this period, the Coalition armies regrouped. Eventually the Coalition followed the lead of the militant "Young German" faction, led by Marshal Blücher and other fighting men of the Coalition armies and attacked.

In late December 1813, three Coalition armies started to cross the Rhine:

- The Army of Bohemia (or the Grand Army), with 200,000–210,000 Austrian soldiers under Prince Schwarzenberg, passed through Swiss territory (violating the cantons' neutrality) and crossed the Rhine between Basel and Schaffhausen on 20 December 1813.
- The Army of Silesia, with 50,000–75,000 Prussians and Russians under Blücher, crossed the Rhine between Rastadt and Koblenz on 1 January 1814.
- The Army of the North, of about 120,000 Prussians and Russians, under Wintzingerode and Bülow, and Dutch troops under Prince Bernadotte, was to move in support on the right flank through the Netherlands and Laon (in the Picardy region in northern France). This force was not yet ready and did not, in fact, reach Picardy until March.

To meet these forces, Napoleon, by the senatus consultum of 9 October 1813, called up the conscript classes of 1814 and 1815. These very young and inexperienced recruits formed the bulk of the new French Army and were nicknamed marie-louises, after the young Empress Marie-Louise.

However, he could only collect about 200,000 men in all. Over 100,000 were engaged against Wellington's army on the Spanish frontier (see Invasion of south-west France), and 20,000 more were set to guard the passes of the Alps. Hence less than 80,000 remained available for the east and north-eastern frontier. However, while Napoleon was weak in numbers, he was now again operating in a friendly country, able to forage food almost everywhere, and benefitted from secure lines of communication.

== Campaign ==
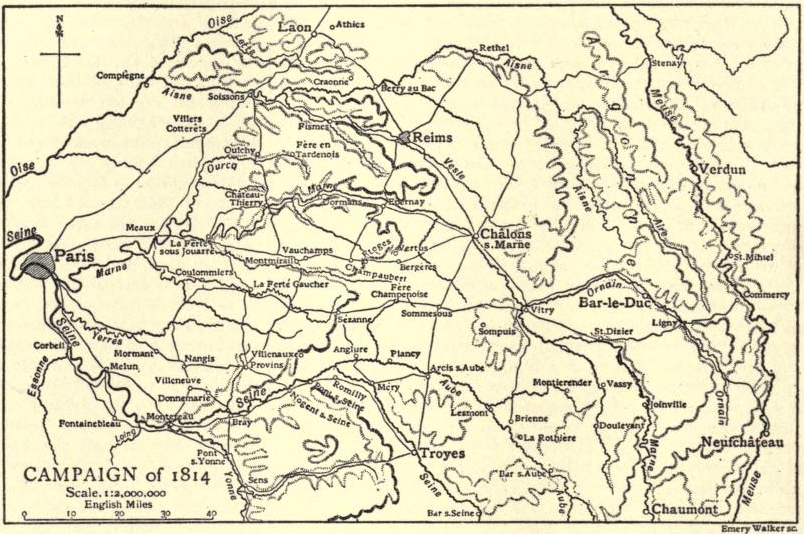

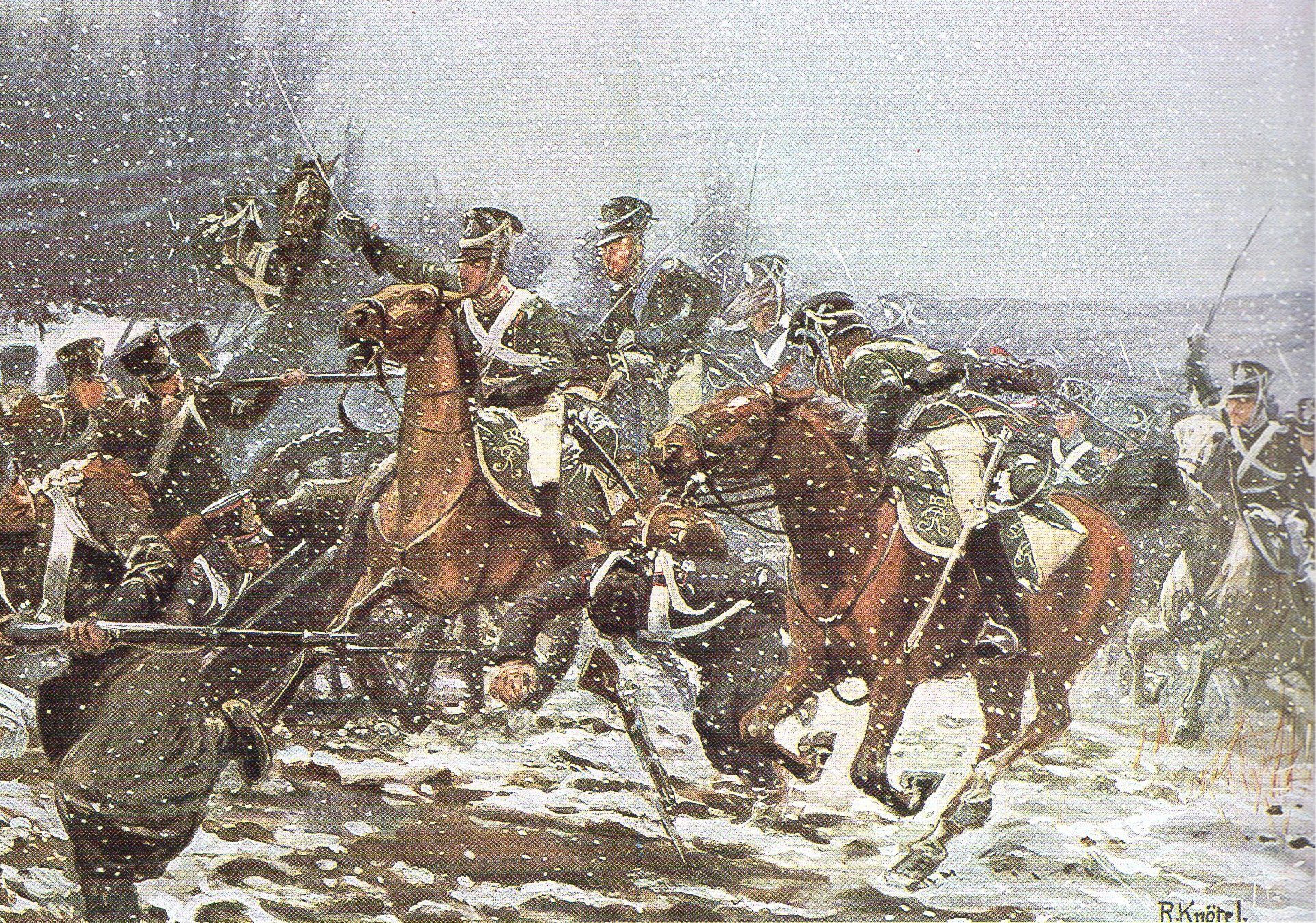
Württemberg dragoons at the battle of La Rothière, by Richard Knötel

Napoleon attempted to counter the incursion of the Army of Silesia shortly after their crossing but arrived too late, and engaged in pursuit. On 25 January Blücher entered Nancy, and, moving rapidly up the valley of the Moselle, was in communication with the Austrian advanced guard near La Rothière on the afternoon 28 January.

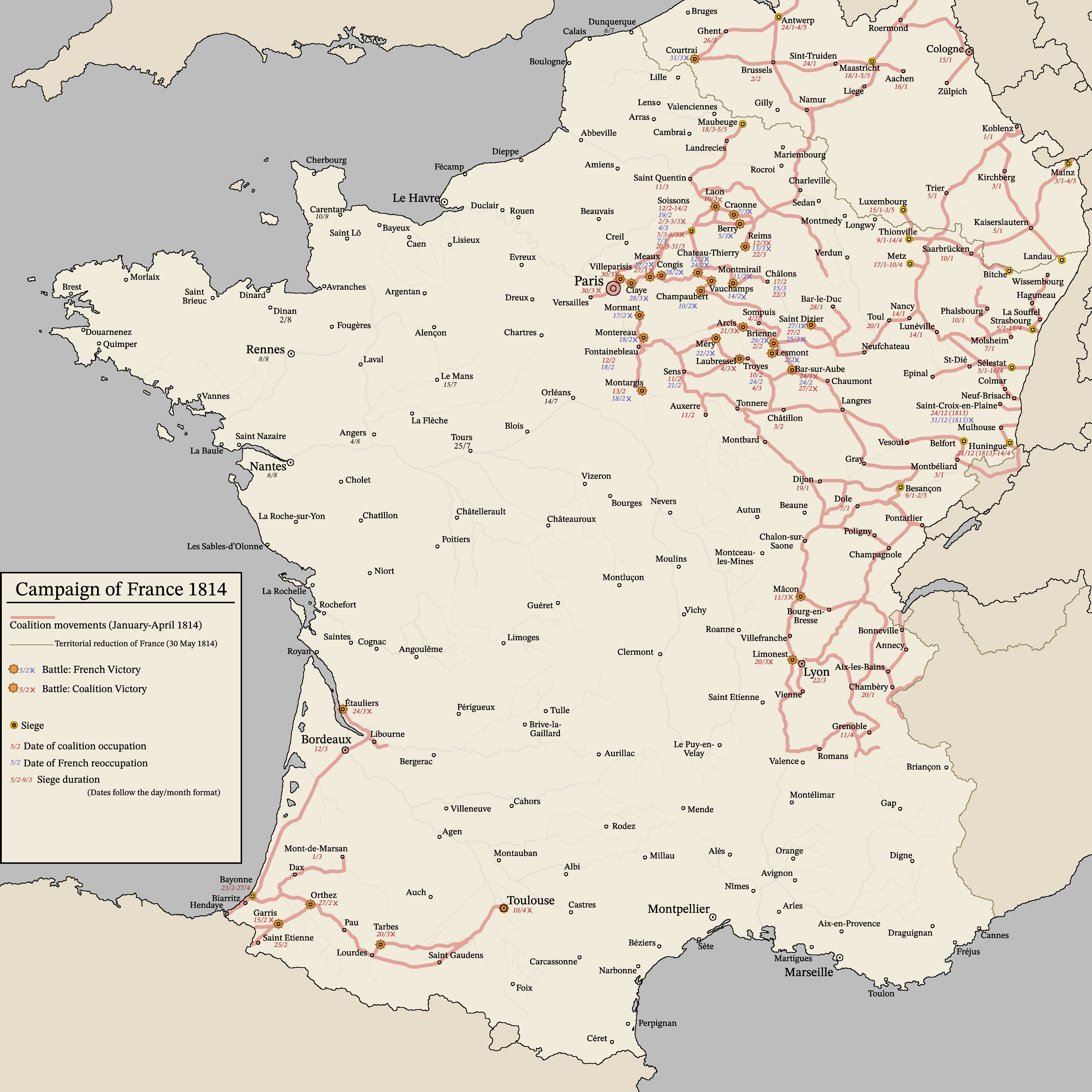
A map of the 1814 campaign of France

On 29 January Napoleon caught up with Blücher and attacked. Blücher's headquarters were surprised and he himself nearly captured by a sudden rush of French troops (Battle of Brienne), learning at the same time that the emperor in person was at hand. Blücher accordingly fell back a few miles next morning to a strong position covering the exits from the Bar-sur-Aube defile. There he was joined by the Austrian advance guard and together they decided to accept battle—indeed they had no alternative, as the roads in rear were so choked with traffic that retreat was out of the question. About noon on 2 February Napoleon engaged them in Battle of La Rothière; but the weather was terrible, and the ground so heavy that his favourite artillery, the mainstay of his whole system of warfare, was useless and in the drifts of snow which at intervals swept across the field, the columns lost their direction and many were severely handled by the Cossacks. At nightfall the fighting ceased and the emperor retired to Lesmont, and thence to Troyes, Marshal Marmont being left to observe the enemy.

=== Vauchamps ===
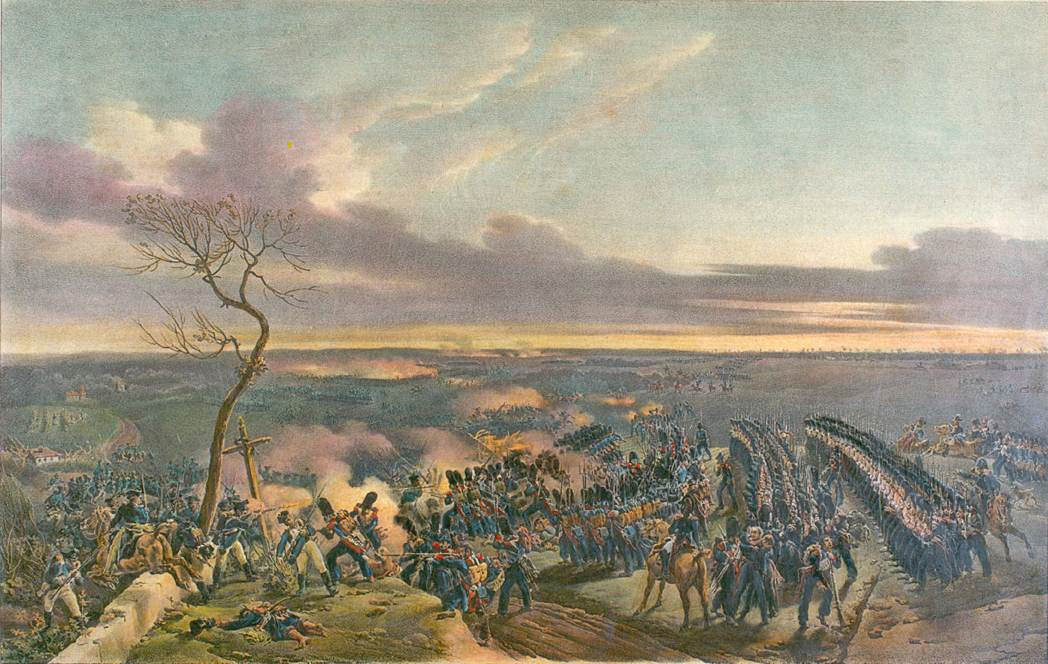
The battle of Montmirail, by Marin-Lavigne.

Owing to the state of the roads, or perhaps to the extraordinary lethargy which always characterised Schwarzenberg's headquarters, no pursuit was attempted. But on 4 February Blücher, chafing at this inaction, obtained the permission of his own sovereign, Frederick William III of Prussia, to transfer his line of operations to the valley of the Marne; Pahlen's corps of Cossacks were assigned to him to cover his left and maintain communication with the Austrians.

Believing himself secure behind this screen, he advanced from Vitry along the roads leading down the valley of the Marne, with his columns widely separated for convenience of subsistence and shelter the latter being almost essential in the terrible weather prevailing. Blücher himself on the night of 7/8 February was at Sézanne, on the exposed flank so as to be nearer to his sources of intelligence, and the rest of his army were distributed in four small corps at or near Épernay, Montmirail and Étoges; reinforcements also were on their way to join him and were then about Vitry.

In the night his headquarters were again surprised, and Blücher learnt that Napoleon himself with his main body was in full march to fall on his scattered detachments. At the same time he heard that Pahlen's Cossacks had been withdrawn forty-eight hours previously, thus completely exposing his flank. He himself retreated towards Étoges endeavouring to rally his scattered detachments.

Napoleon was too quick for Blücher: he decimated Lieutenant General Olssufiev's Russian IX Corps at the Battle of Champaubert (10 February). This placed his army between Blücher's vanguard and his main body. Napoleon turned his attention to the vanguard and defeated Osten-Sacken and Yorck at Montmirail on 11 February; and attacked and defeated them again the next day at the Battle of Château-Thierry. Napoleon then turned on the main body of the Army of Silesia and on 14 February defeated Blücher in Battle of Vauchamps near Étoges, pursuing the latter towards Vertus. These disasters compelled the retreat of the whole Silesian army, and Napoleon, leaving detachments with marshals Mortier and Marmont to deal with them, hurried back to Troyes.

Napoleon with his main body struck at the flank of Schwarzenberg's Austrian army, which had meanwhile begun its leisurely advance, and again at Mormant (17 February), Montereau (18 February) and Méry-sur-Seine (21 February). He inflicted such heavy punishment upon his adversaries that they fell back precipitately to Bar-sur-Aube.

=== Laon ===
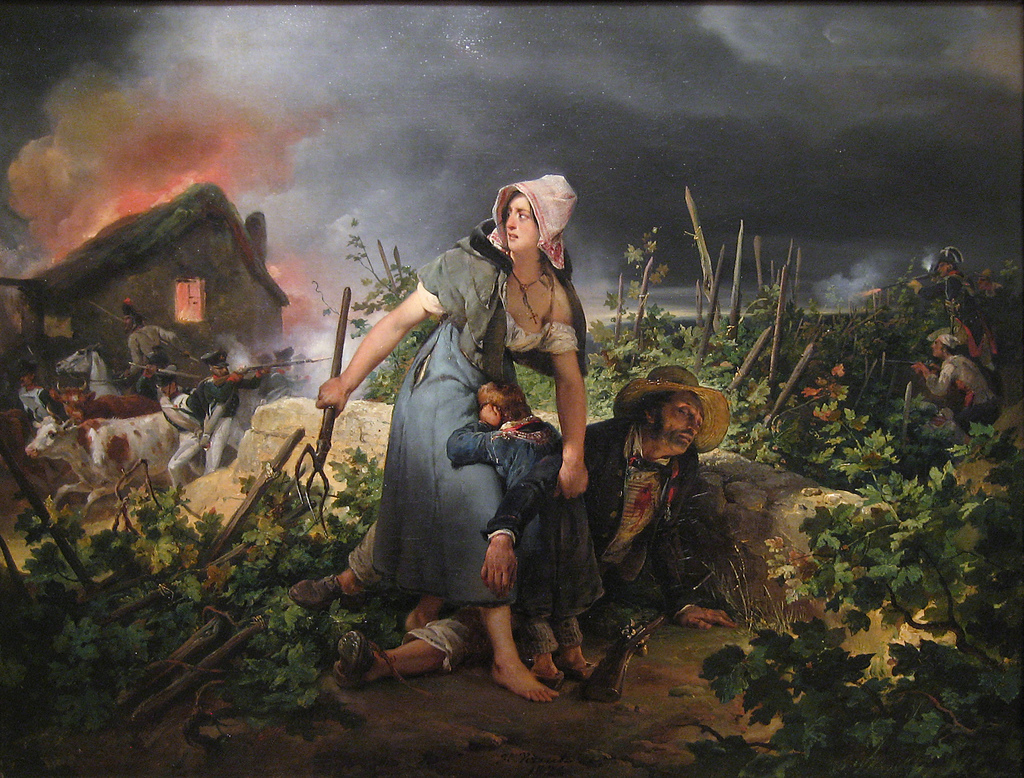
Episode of the Campaign of France, by Horace Vernet

In the meantime Blücher had rallied his scattered forces and was driving Marmont and Mortier before him. Napoleon, as soon as he had neutralised Schwarzenberg, counter-marched his main body. Moving again by Sézanne, he fell upon Blücher's left and drove him back upon Soissons. The French garrison there had capitulated only twenty-four hours beforehand, a fact of which Napoleon was unaware. The Silesian army was thus able to escape, and marching northwards combined with Bernadotte's Army of the North at Laon. This reinforcement brought the forces at Blücher's disposal up to over 100,000 men.

On 7 March, Napoleon fell upon the advance guard of this force at the Battle of Craonne and drove it back upon Laon, where the Battle of Laon took place on 9 March. Napoleon was here defeated, and with only 30,000 men at his back, retreated to Soissons. On hearing that Reims had fallen to a Coalition corps under the command of the Russian General Saint-Priest, Napoleon crossed in front of Blücher's force. On 13 March Napoleon retook Reims; Saint-Priest was mortally wounded in the battle.

=== Arcis-sur-Aube ===
On 14 March, Schwarzenberg, becoming aware of Napoleon's presence in Reims, began again his advance and his advanced guard had reached Arcis-sur-Aube, when Napoleon intercepted it on 20 March. At the start of the Battle of Arcis-sur-Aube, the Austrians were about 21,000 strong while the French fielded 20,000, however during the night of 20/21 both sides received reinforcements. On the second day of the battle while French strength was about 28,000 the Austrians now deployed 80,000. This forced the issue and while French losses were less than the Austrians, Napoleon was forced to withdraw eastwards and Schwarzenberg was free to advance west.

=== Coalition armies march on Paris ===
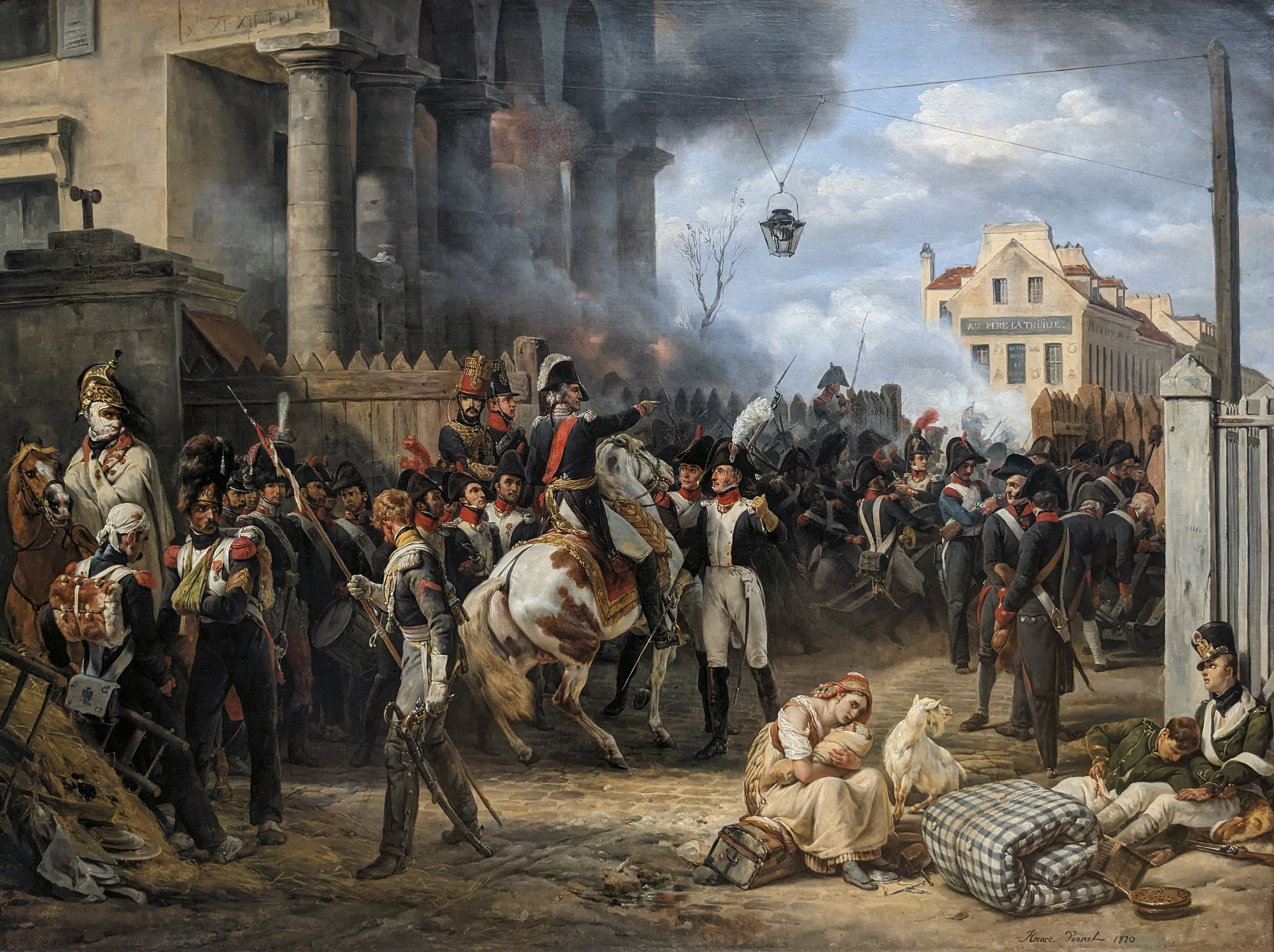
Episode of the Battle of Paris, by Horace Vernet

Thus after six weeks fighting the Coalition armies had hardly gained any ground. The Coalition generals still hoped to bring Napoleon to battle against their combined forces. However, after Arcis-sur-Aube, Napoleon realised that he could no longer continue with his current strategy of defeating the Coalition armies in detail and decided to change his tactics. He had two options: he could fall back on Paris and hope that the Coalition members would come to terms, as capturing Paris with a French army under his command would be difficult and time-consuming; or he could copy the Russians and leave Paris to his enemies (as they had left Moscow to him two years earlier). He decided to move eastward to Saint-Dizier, rally what garrisons he could find, and raise the whole country against the invaders. He had actually started on the execution of this plan when a letter to Empress Marie-Louise outlining his intention to move on the Coalition lines of communications was intercepted by Cossacks in Blücher's army on 22 March and hence his projects were exposed to his enemies.

The Coalition commanders held a council of war at Pougy on the 23 March and initially decided to follow Napoleon, but the next day Tsar Alexander I of Russia and King Frederick William III of Prussia along with their advisers reconsidered, and realising the weakness of their opponent (and perhaps actuated by the fear that Duke of Wellington from Toulouse might, after all, reach Paris first), decided to march to Paris (then an open city), and let Napoleon do his worst to their lines of communications.

The Coalition armies marched straight for the capital. Marmont and Mortier with what troops they could rally took up a position on Montmartre heights to oppose them. The Battle of Paris ended when the French commanders, seeing further resistance to be hopeless, surrendered the city on 31 March, just as Napoleon, with the wreck of the Guards and a mere handful of other detachments, was hurrying across the rear of the Austrians towards Fontainebleau to join them.

== Aftermath ==
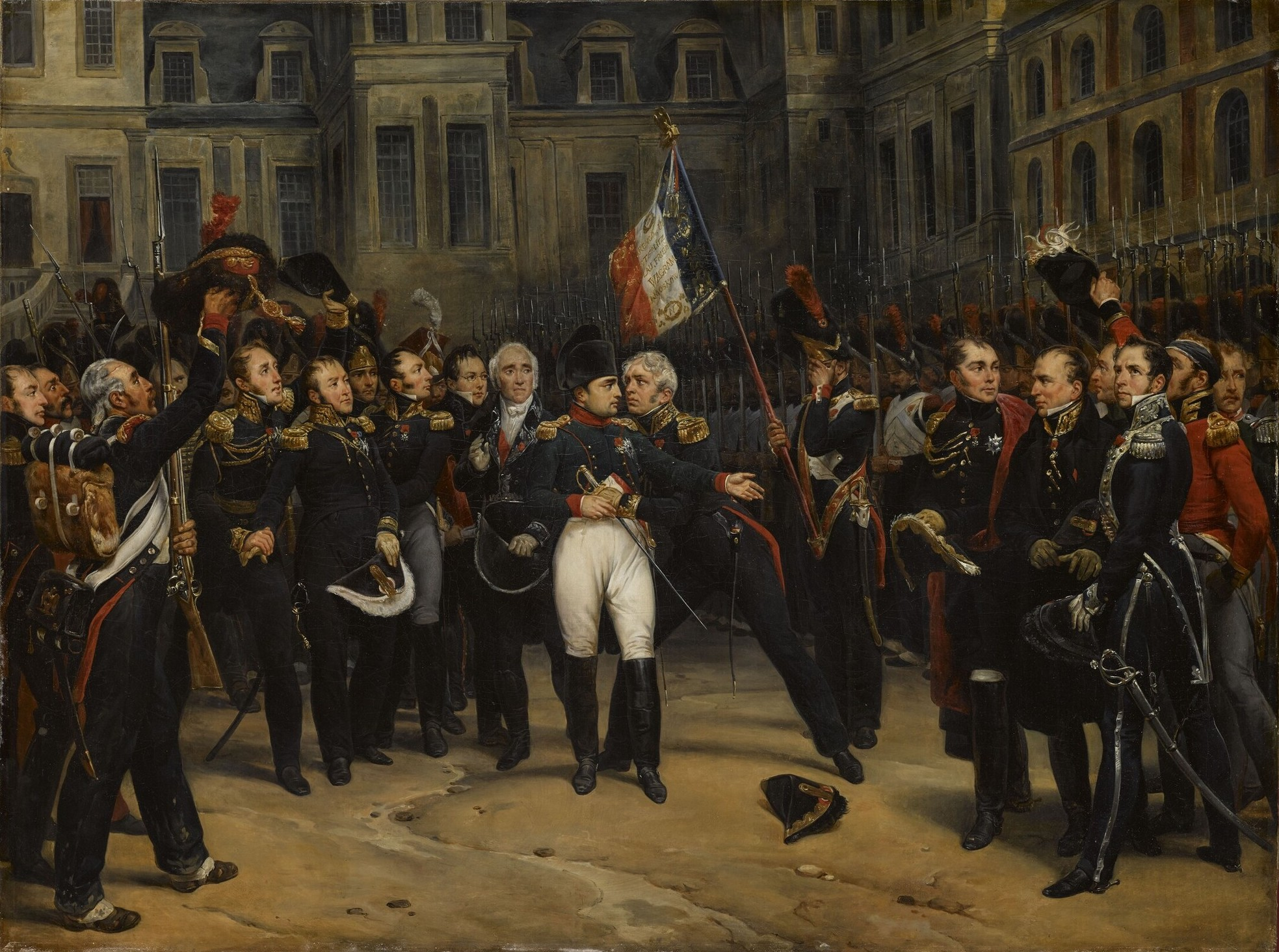
Napoleon's farewell to his Old Guard in the Courtyard of the Palace of Fontainebleau, by Antoine-Alphonse Montfort

On 2 April, the French Senate agreed to the Coalition's terms and passed a resolution deposing Napoleon (Acte de déchéance de l'Empereur). They also passed a decree dated 5 April, justifying their actions. Napoleon was out of position to defend Paris, and had only advanced as far as Fontainebleau when he learned that Paris had surrendered. When Napoleon proposed the army march on the capital, his marshals decided to overrule Napoleon in order to save Paris from destruction. On 4 April, Napoleon abdicated in favour of his son, with Marie-Louise as regent. However, the Coalition refused to accept this. Napoleon was then forced to announce his unconditional abdication only two days later and sign the Treaty of Fontainebleau.

Napoleon was sent into exile on the island of Elba and the monarchy under Louis XVIII was restored. The Treaty of Paris, signed by representatives of the French monarchy and the Coalition powers, formally ended the War of the Sixth Coalition on 30 May 1814, returning France to its 1792 boundaries in advance of the Congress of Vienna. Napoleon escaped from Elba the following year leading to the Hundred Days; he was eventually defeated at Waterloo by the Seventh Coalition.

== See also ==
- List of battles during the Campaign of France
