= Battle of Paris (1814) =

1814 battle of the War of the Sixth Coalition

- Part of the Campaign of France of the Sixth Coalition
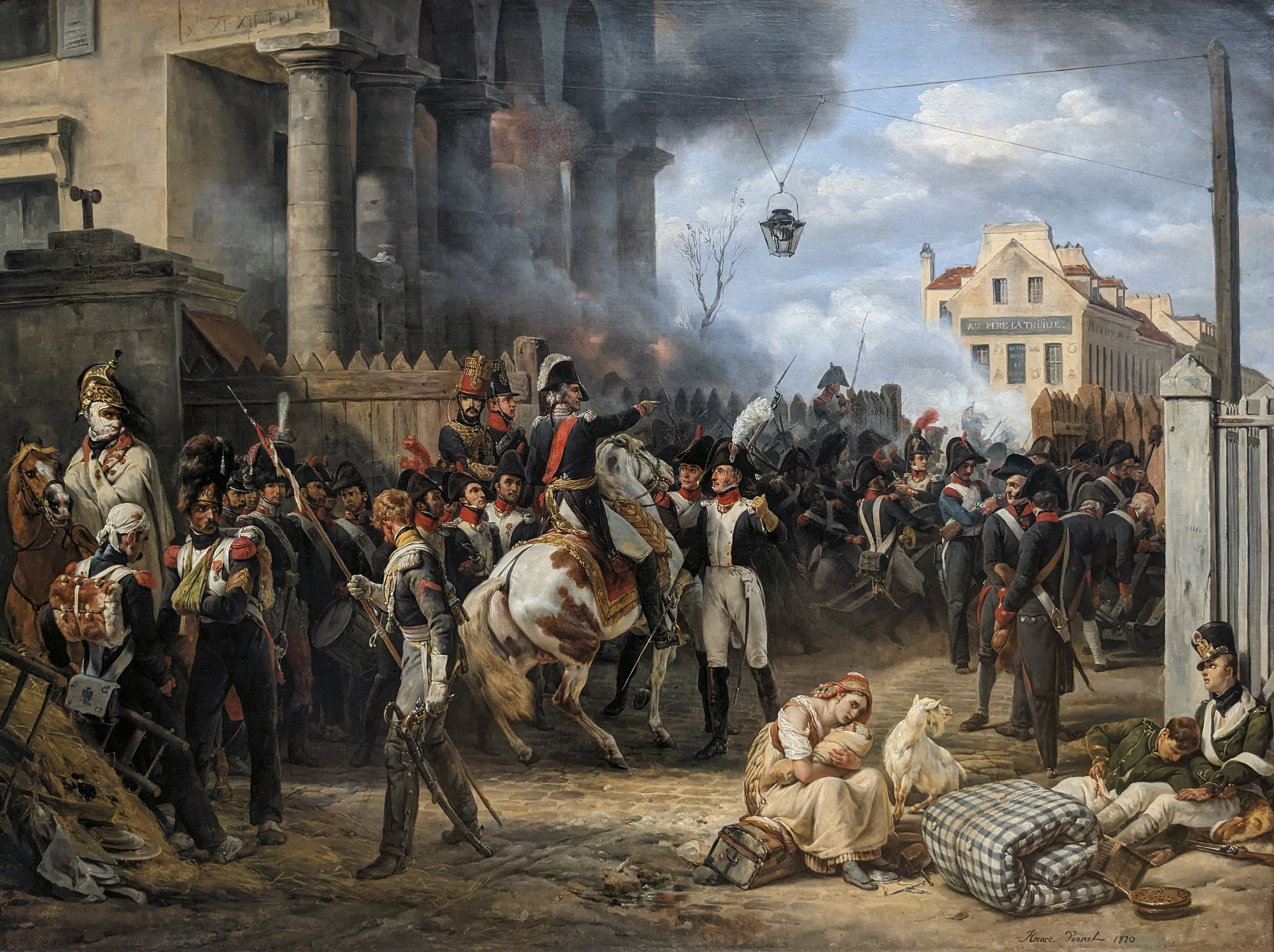
- 1820 painting of the battle
Date	30–31 March 1814
Location	Paris, France 48.8566°N 2.3518°E
Result	Coalition victory

Belligerents
(Russian Empire) Russia; (Austrian Empire) Austria; (Kingdom of Prussia) Prussia; (Kingdom of Württemberg) Württemberg	(First French Empire) France

Commanders and leaders
(Russian Empire) Tsar Alexander I (Austrian Empire) Karl Schwarzenberg (Kingdom of Prussia) Frederick William III (Kingdom of Prussia) Gebhard Blücher	(First French Empire) Joseph Bonaparte (First French Empire) Auguste de Marmont (First French Empire) Édouard Mortier (First French Empire) Bon-Adrien Moncey

Strength
100,000–145,500	37,526–42,000

Casualties and losses
6,705–9,000	5,000–9,300, 126 guns
- Location within France

War of the Sixth Coalition:
Campaign in north-east France
current battle
Napoleon in command
Napoleon not in command

The Battle of Paris or the Storming of Paris (30–31 March 1814) saw the Allied forces of Russia, Austria, Prussia, and Württemberg attack Paris defended by troops of the First French Empire under Joseph Bonaparte. The French soldiers put up a stout resistance at the capital's eastern suburbs on 30 March but were steadily driven back by the overwhelmingly superior Allied forces. Faced with a hopeless situation, Marshals Auguste de Marmont and Édouard Mortier agreed to a ceasefire with the Allies in the late afternoon. The French evacuated Paris on 31 March according to the terms of the convention reached with the Allied leaders Tsar Alexander I of Russia, King Frederick William III of Prussia, and Austrian Field Marshal Karl Philipp, Prince of Schwarzenberg. This defeat marked the end of the War of the Sixth Coalition and soon forced Emperor Napoleon to abdicate and go into exile.

== Background ==
After being decisively defeated by the Coalition armies at the Battle of Leipzig on 16–19 October 1813, Napoleon with 60,000–70,000 French soldiers retreated across the Rhine River in November 1813. Garrisons numbering 100,000 men in the German fortresses would be lost to Napoleon in the 1814 campaign. All the former French allies in Germany such as the Kingdom of Bavaria now switched sides and joined the Coalition. Napoleon spread out his weak forces in a thin cordon along the Rhine while trying to raise a new army to face the Coalition. To oppose the numerically superior allies, Napoleon could deploy only 129,106 men on 1 December 1813. Against this, the Allies had 156,868 men in the Army of Bohemia under Schwarzenberg, 77,100 soldiers in the Army of Silesia under Field Marshal Gebhard Leberecht von Blücher, 30,000 Prussians under Lieutenant General Friedrich Wilhelm Freiherr von Bülow, and 36,000 Russians under Lieutenant General Ferdinand von Wintzingerode.

Three Coalition armies prepared to invade France. The Army of Bohemia deployed on the upper Rhine while assigning 12,000 men to occupy Switzerland. The Army of Silesia stood on the middle Rhine. Bülow and Wintzingerode of the North Army prepared to invade the Netherlands. The Army of Bohemia crossed the upper Rhine near Basel on 20 December 1813. The Army of Silesia under Blücher passed the middle Rhine on 1 January 1814. Wintzingerode crossed the lower Rhine on 6 January. At first, the French defenders made hardly any resistance at all. In addition to recruiting new soldiers, Napoleon transferred troops from the armies of Marshals Jean-de-Dieu Soult and Louis-Gabriel Suchet that were opposing the British, Portuguese, and Spanish armies in southwest France.

== Prelude ==
=== Campaign in northeastern France ===
The First Battle of Bar-sur-Aube on 24 January 1814 was an indecisive clash between 20,000 French led by Mortier and the Army of Bohemia's 3rd Corps under Feldzeugmeister (FZM) Ignaz Gyulai. At this time, Napoleon arrived at the front and with 36,000 troops attacked Blucher's 28,000 men at the Battle of Brienne on 29 January. The Allies defeated Napoleon by concentrating 80,000 men against 45,000 French at the Battle of La Rothière on 1 February. Elated by their victory, the Allies decided to make a two-pronged advance toward Paris. Schwarzenberg's army moved toward Troyes along the Seine River, while farther north Blücher pressed forward toward Meaux along the Marne River.

Napoleon turned against Blücher who had allowed his army to become so strung out, that his advance elements were 44 mi (71 km) ahead of his rearguard. In the Six Days' Campaign between 10 and 14 February 1814, Napoleon mauled the Army of Silesia. During this period, Blücher's 56,000-strong army suffered 16,000 casualties and lost 47 guns, while French losses numbered only around 4,000. Nevertheless, the Army of Silesia was soon reinforced to a total of 53,000 men. While the Army of Silesia recovered from its drubbing, Napoleon turned against Schwarzenberg, whose advance elements were across the Seine. On 17 February, Napoleon crushed Schwarzenberg's advance guard at the Battle of Mormant and the next day routed Crown Prince William of Württemberg at the Battle of Montereau. This caused Schwarzenberg to retreat and to call Blücher to join him.

On 20 February 1814, Schwarzenberg received news that Marshal Charles-Pierre Augereau's French army in the south was menacing Geneva and Besançon. Earlier, the 2nd Corps (Austrian) was detached from the Army of Bohemia to support operations near Switzerland. To face this new threat to his south flank, Schwarzenberg sent the 1st Corps (Austrian) to Dijon, reducing his army to 90,000 men. Together with Blücher, the Coalition still had 140,000 soldiers to face Napoleon with 75,000, but Schwarzenberg ordered another withdrawal. However, Blücher moved northwest in another lunge at Paris after getting permission to separate from the Army of Bohemia. Since only a scanty force under Marmont and Mortier stood between Blücher and Paris, on 26 February, Napoleon set out in pursuit of the Army of Silesia.

There was a clash at the Battle of Gué-à-Tresmes at the end of February 1814. Napoleon pursued Blücher north across the Aisne River where the troops of Wintzingerode and Bülow joined the Army of Silesia. This reinforcement gave Blücher 110,000 troops against the 48,000 French opposed to him. After the Battle of Craonne on 7 March, Napoleon attacked Blücher at the Battle of Laon on 9–10 March and was defeated. Next, Napoleon rapidly switched his forces to oppose an Allied corps under GL Guillaume Emmanuel Guignard, vicomte de Saint-Priest that had captured Reims. On 13 March, Napoleon's forces attacked the Allies in the Battle of Reims, killing Saint-Priest and routing his corps.

While Napoleon was tilting with Blücher in the north, Schwarzenberg's host slowly advanced, beating the French at the Second Battle of Bar-sur-Aube on 26–27 February 1814 and the Battle of Laubressel on 3–4 March. Napoleon now turned against Schwarzenburg, who paused his advance after hearing the news of Reims. Thinking he had Schwarzenberg on the run, Napoleon found himself involved in the Battle of Arcis-sur-Aube on 20–21 March when his normally cautious opponent decided to fight. Enjoying a numerical superiority of 80,000 to only 28,000 French, the Allies defeated Napoleon, though they failed to pursue. The French emperor moved east to cut the Army of Bohemia's supply line and to add the garrisons of Verdun and Metz to his army. Emperor Francis I of Austria at Bar-sur-Aube fled to Dijon and missed being captured by French cavalry by only a few hours.

=== Defenses of Paris ===
Since the disaster in Russia and the start of the war, the French populace had become increasingly war-weary. Napoleon felt that fortifying his own capital would make him look weak in the eyes of the French population. Joseph Bonaparte was responsible for defending Paris, but because of his shortcomings, military organization and administration was poor. Marshal Bon-Adrien Jeannot de Moncey was in charge of the National Guard. There were also some regular army units and Imperial Guard reserves. In January 1814, a plan was proposed to fortify Paris with earthworks, but it was rejected by Napoleon. Later, 56 wooden barricades were built to deter cavalry raids. These were armed with 40 4-pounder guns and 20 8-pounder guns. The rejected fortification plan was revived, but Joseph insisted on delaying it until it could be approved by Napoleon. Because of this, Paris remained virtually unfortified. Meanwhile, Charles Maurice de Talleyrand-Périgord was at Paris, intriguing against Napoleon.

=== Tsar Alexander's initiative ===
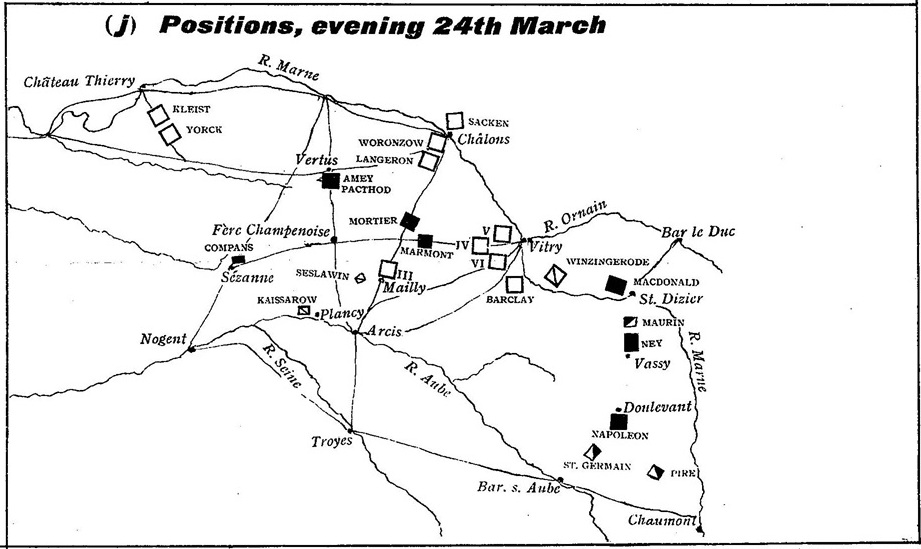
Positions, evening 24 March 1814, before the Battle of Fère-Champenoise. The Allies crush Marmont, Mortier, and Pacthod.

The Allies captured an uncoded message from Napoleon to his empress. It read, "I have decided to move on to the Marne in order to push the enemy's armies farther from Paris and to draw myself nearer my fortresses." An intercepted message from Chief of Police Jean René Savary to Napoleon stated that Paris' magazines were empty and its population was demanding peace. Tsar Alexander read the captured dispatches and realized that the proper objective was Paris. He asked the opinions of Generals Michael Andreas Barclay de Tolly, Hans Karl von Diebitsch, and Karl Wilhelm von Toll. Barclay de Tolly wanted to follow Napoleon. Diebitsch wanted to send 40,000 or 50,000 men to Paris and follow Napoleon with the remainder. Toll argued for advancing on Paris with most of the armies while sending 10,000 cavalry under Wintzingerode after Napoleon as a diversion. Since Toll's opinion matched what Alexander believed, the King of Prussia and Schwarzenberg were convinced to accept this strategy. Orders were also sent to Blücher to cooperate in the march on Paris.

Marmont and Mortier did not realize that the Army of Bohemia was advancing directly toward them. On 25 March 1814, their 19,000 soldiers encountered Coalition forces in the Battle of Fère-Champenoise and were badly beaten, suffering 6,000 casualties and losing 45 guns. In addition, a nearby French force of 4,300 men and 16 guns under General of Division (GD) Michel-Marie Pacthod was surrounded and wiped out. Blocked from retreating directly to Meaux by part of Blücher's army, the forces of Marmont and Mortier managed to escape to Paris via Provins. Meanwhile, Napoleon won a useless victory over Wintzingerode's 10,000 horsemen in the Battle of Saint-Dizier on 26 March. By the next day, Napoleon realized that his opponents had a three-day lead in the race for Paris. He ordered the army to march to Paris via Troyes. Empress Marie Louise and her son the King of Rome left Paris on 29 March and traveled south.

== Forces ==
=== Coalition forces ===
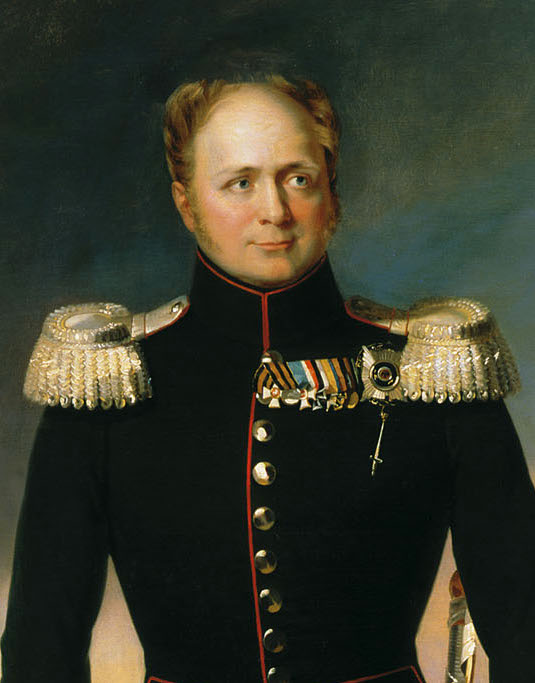
Tsar Alexander I

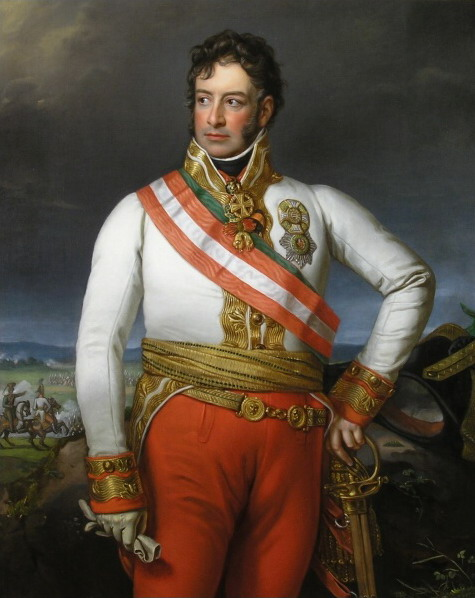
Prince Schwarzenberg

By the evening of 29 March 1814, the main Coalition armies stood in front of Paris. According to historian Francis Loraine Petre, the Allied force before Paris numbered 107,000 men. To defend against Napoleon, GL Fabian Gottlieb von der Osten-Sacken's Russian army corps and GL Karl Philipp von Wrede's Bavarian-Austrian 5th Corps were stationed near Trilport. Bülow's Prussian corps was besieging Soissons. When nearing Paris, Russian troops broke ranks and ran forward to get their first glimpse of the city.

Historian George Nafziger estimated the Coalition strength (145,500) as follows.

Coalition order of battle for the Battle of Paris
Column	Corps	Infantry	Cavalry
Right; Gebhard von Blücher	Ludwig von Yorck	12,000	3,500
Right; Gebhard von Blücher	Friedrich von Kleist	11,000	3,000
Right; Gebhard von Blücher	Louis de Langeron	14,000	5,000
Right; Gebhard von Blücher	Mikhail Vorontsov	15,000	0
Center; Andreas Barclay de Tolly	Nikolay Raevsky	16,000	3,000
Center; Andreas Barclay de Tolly	Reserve	6,000	3,000
Center; Andreas Barclay de Tolly	Russian & Prussian Guards	15,000	4,000
Left; Crown Prince of Württemberg	4th Corps (Württemberg)	10,000	2,000
Left; Crown Prince of Württemberg	3rd Corps (Ignaz Gyulai)	15,000	3,000
Left; Crown Prince of Württemberg	Austrian Grenadiers	5,000	0
Totals	-	119,000	26,500

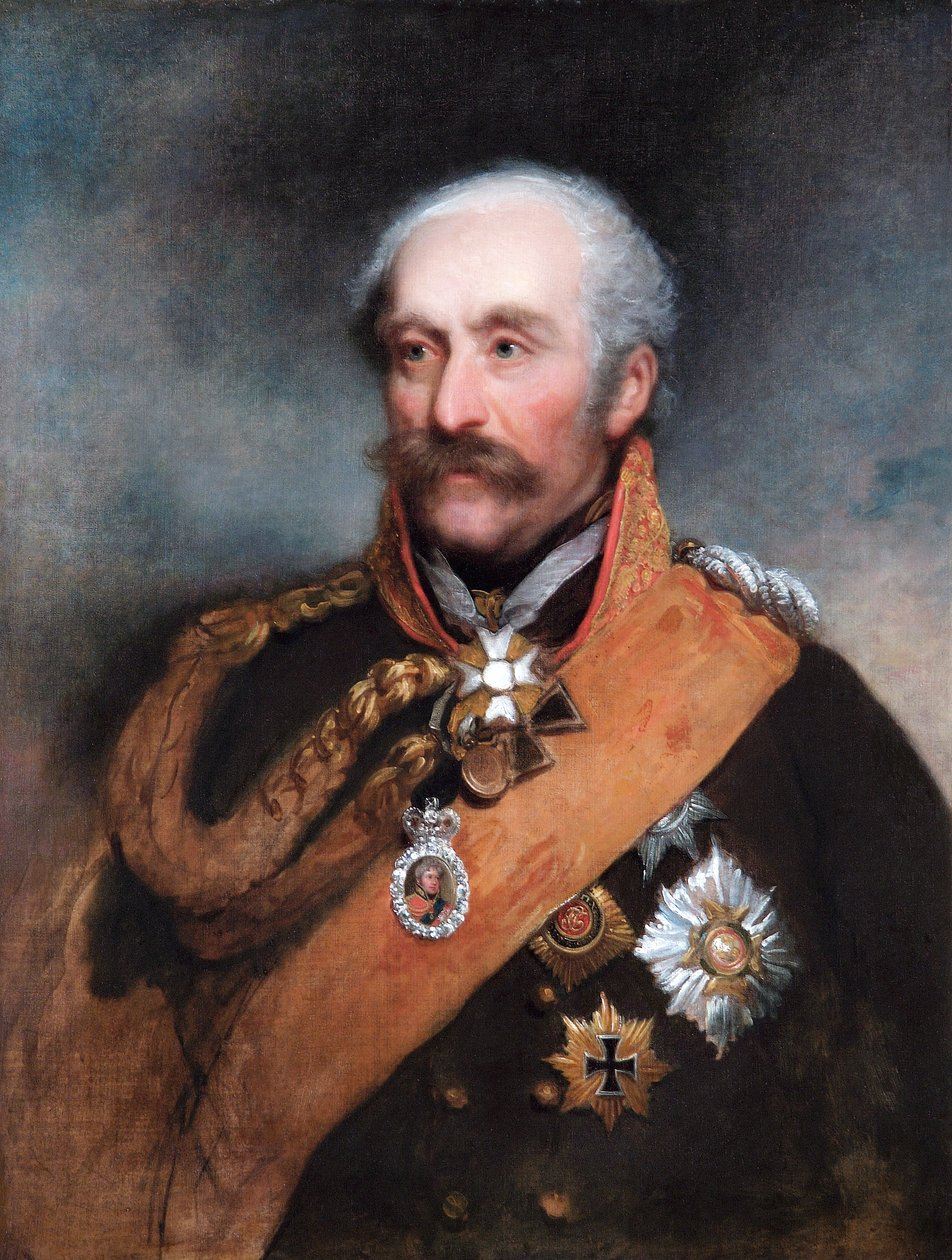
Gebhard von Blücher

Nafziger also gave the following lower Coalition strength estimate, based on data from von Damitz. Sacken and Wrede are gray because they were at Triport guarding against Napoleon's possible intervention.

Coalition order of battle (from von Damitz) for the Battle of Paris
Army	Corps	Nationality	Strength
Army of Silesia (57,000)	Ludwig von Yorck	Prussian	10,000
Army of Silesia (57,000)	Friedrich von Kleist	Prussian	8,000
Army of Silesia (57,000)	Louis de Langeron	Russian	17,000
Army of Silesia (57,000)	Mikhail Vorontsov	Russian	12,000
Army of Silesia (57,000)	Fabian Osten-Sacken	Russian	10,000
Army of Bohemia (73,000)	3rd Corps (Ignaz Gyulai)	Austrian	10,000
Army of Bohemia (73,000)	4th Corps (Württemberg)	Württemberg; Austrian	15,000 (Note: This strength includes the Austrian grenadiers (Nafziger, p. 435).)
Army of Bohemia (73,000)	5th Corps (Karl Wrede)	Bavarian; Austrian	20,000
Army of Bohemia (73,000)	6th Corps (Nikolay Raevsky)	Russian	12,000
Army of Bohemia (73,000)	Guards	Russian; Prussian; Baden	16,000

=== French forces ===
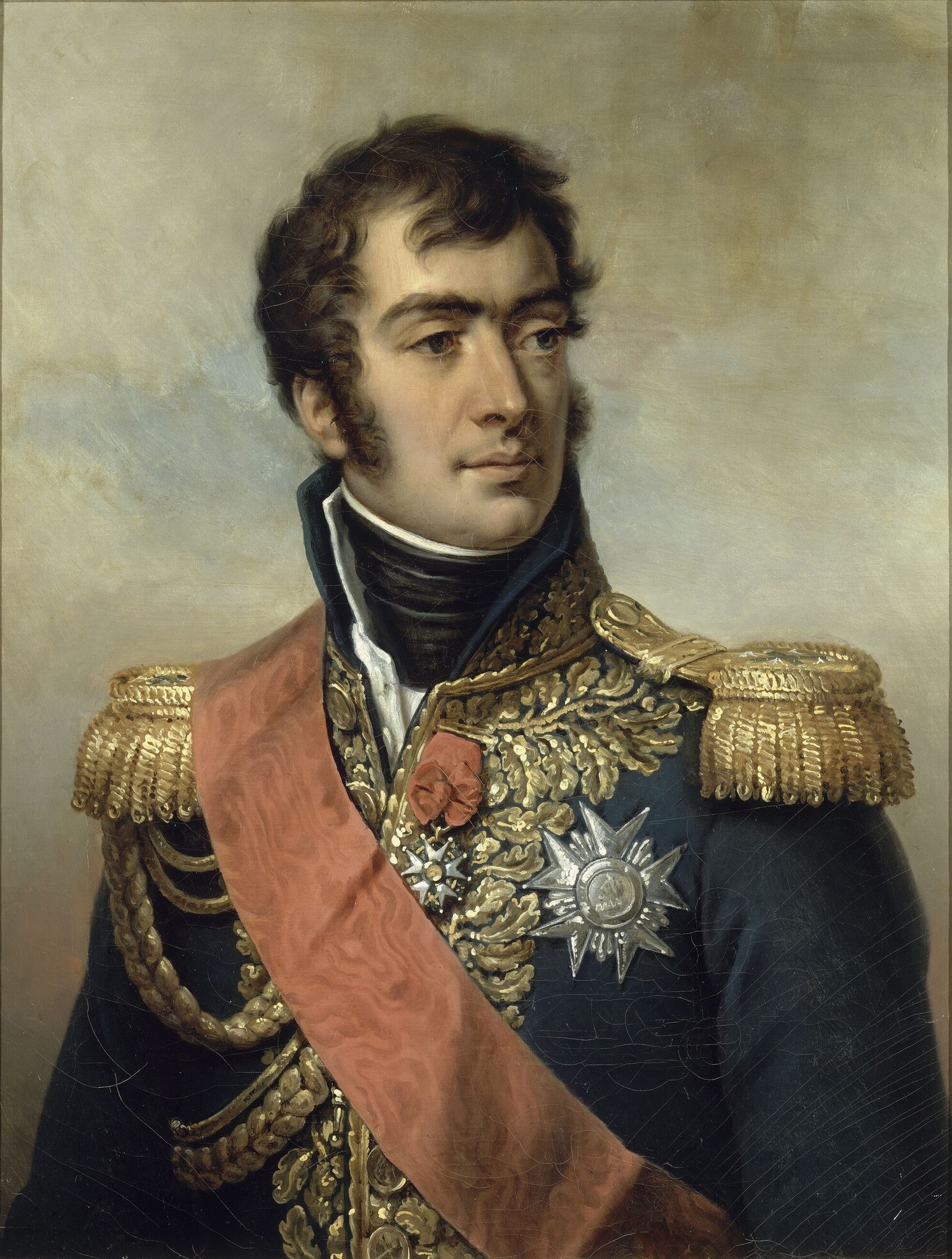
Auguste de Marmont

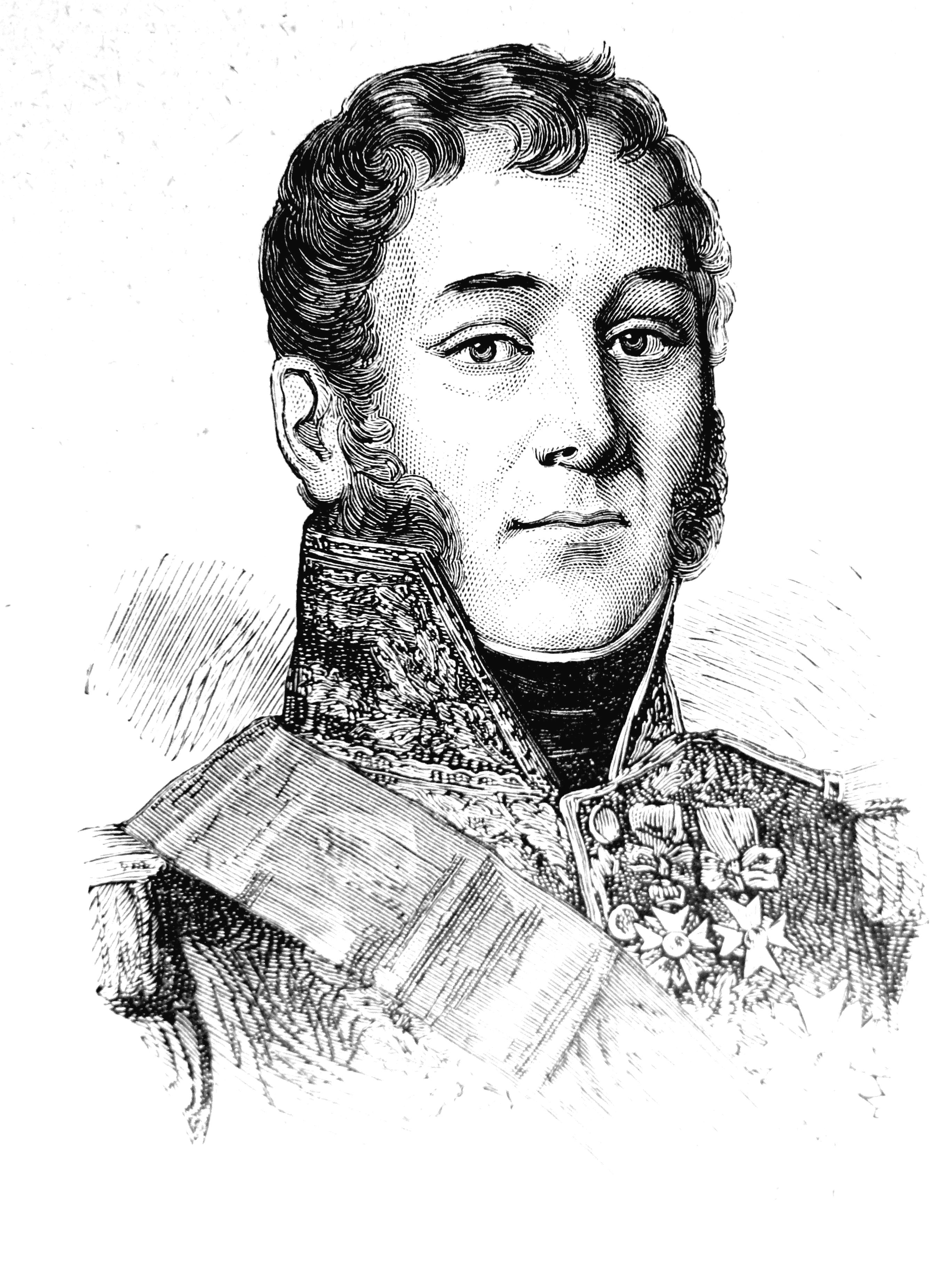
Édouard Mortier

The French order of battle is listed in the following table. It shows that there were 25,526 regular army troops. In addition, the National Guards numbered 12,000 but only about half were armed with muskets; most of the weapons were distributed between 27 and 30 March.

Joseph Bonaparte commanded at Paris and his chief-of-staff was GD Maurice Mathieu.

French order of battle for the Battle of Paris
Wing	Division	Commander	Infantry	Cavalry
Right Wing; Marshal Marmont	Infantry Division	Jean-Toussaint Arrighi	1,250	0
Right Wing; Marshal Marmont	8th Infantry Division	Étienne Pierre Ricard	726	0
Right Wing; Marshal Marmont	3rd Infantry Division	Joseph Lagrange	1,395	0
Right Wing; Marshal Marmont	Provisional Division	Jean Dominique Compans	2,220	0
Right Wing; Marshal Marmont	Provisional Division	François Ledru des Essarts	1,600	0
Right Wing; Marshal Marmont	Provisional Division	Joseph Boyer de Rébeval	1,850	0
Right Wing; Marshal Marmont	2nd Heavy Cavalry Division	Étienne de Bordesoulle	0	895
Right Wing; Marshal Marmont	1st Light Cavalry Division	Christophe Antoine Merlin	0	850
Right Wing; Marshal Marmont	Cavalry Division	Louis Pierre Chastel	0	1,600
Left Wing; Marshal Mortier	Imperial Guard Depots	Claude-Étienne Michel	4,000	0
Left Wing; Marshal Mortier	7th Young Guard Division	Henri François Charpentier	1,500	0
Left Wing; Marshal Mortier	2nd Young Guard Division	Philibert Jean-Baptiste Curial	1,820	0
Left Wing; Marshal Mortier	2nd Old Guard Division	Charles-Joseph Christiani	1,630	0
Left Wing; Marshal Mortier	Cavalry Division	Philippe Antoine d'Ornano	0	320
Left Wing; Marshal Mortier	6th Heavy Cavalry Division	Nicolas Roussel d'Hurbal	0	1,900
Garrisons	Saint-Denis	-	570	0
Garrisons	Vincennes	-	400	0
Garrisons	Neuilly	-	250	0
Garrisons	Charenton	-	450	0
Garrisons	Saint-Maur	-	300	0
Totals	---	---	19,961	5,565

== Battle ==
=== Dispositions ===
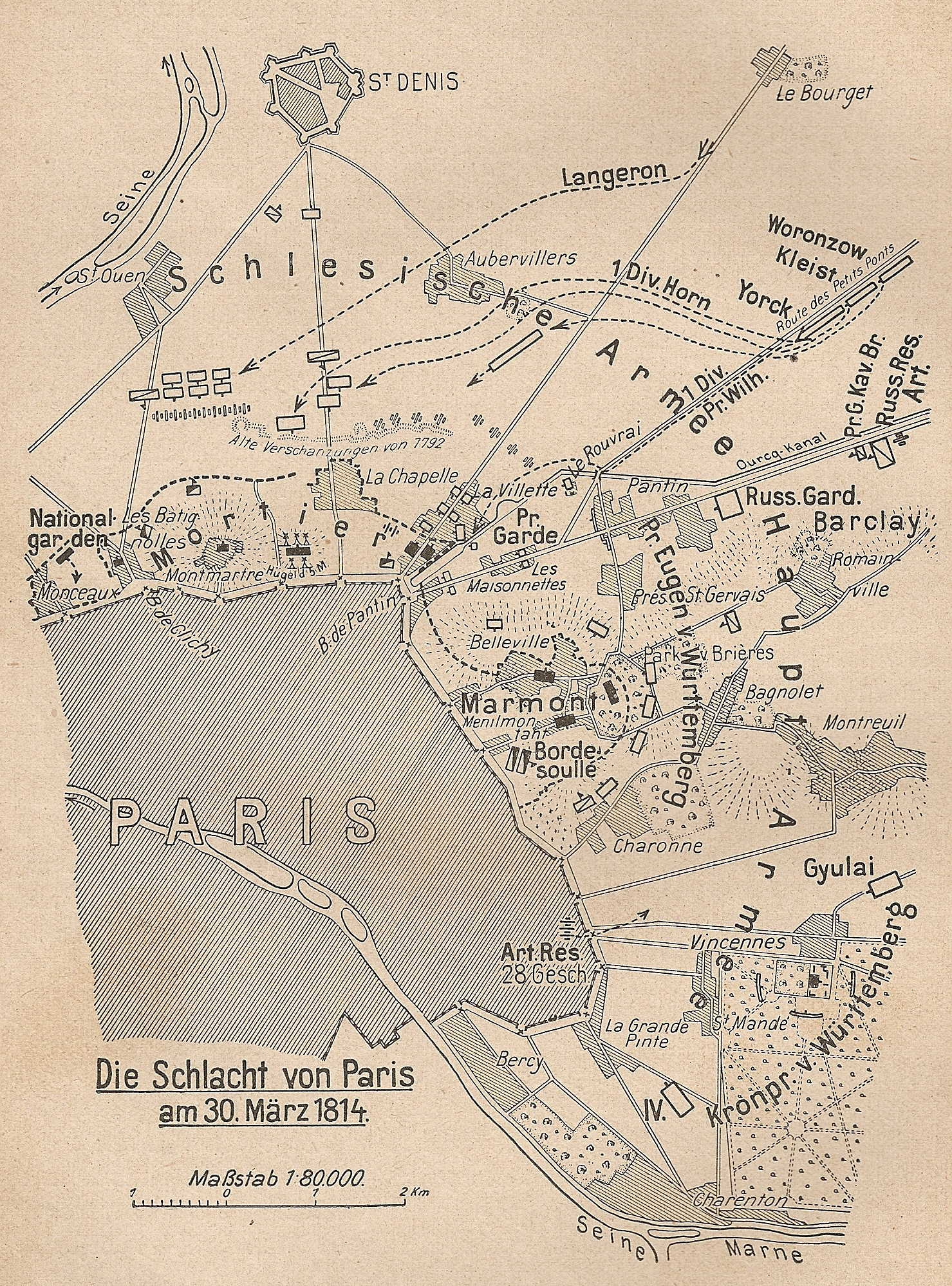
Battle of Paris map, 30 March 1814

Joseph ordered Marmont's right wing to defend Romainville, Pantin, and Le Pré-Saint-Gervais on the east side of Paris. Mortier's left wing was directed to hold Montmartre, La Chapelle, and La Villette on the north side. The National Guards, who were described as "unenthusiastic", were to defend the barricades around the city of Paris. On Marmont's extreme right wing was the cavalry of Bordesoulle and Chastel. From right to left, Arrighi posted his troops in Bagnolet and Montreuil. Lagrange's division defended the road from Romainville to Belleville, Paris with Ricard's soldiers in the second line. Ledru's division held Le Pré-Saint-Gervais with Compans' troops covering its front in the Romainville forest. Boyer de Rebeval was posted behind Pantin.

From right to left on Mortier's front, one of Michel's brigades was with Boyer de Rebeval near Pantin while the other brigade was holding Aubervilliers. Though technically an Imperial Guard unit, Michel's men were not crack troops. Next in line was Charpentier's division while Curial's troops were in reserve supporting Michel. Christiani held the ground between La Villette and La Chapelle. The cavalry of Roussel and Ornano were located on the far left flank. There were two 12-gun 12-pounder batteries, one at La Rouvrai near Pantin and the second at Le Pré-Saint-Gervais. Smaller batteries of lesser caliber were positioned near Montreuil, Charonne, Le Pré-Saint-Gervais, and Montmartre.

After camping outside the city on 29 March, the Coalition forces were to assault the city from its northern and eastern sides on the morning of 30 March. Since the Allies were aware that Napoleon's army was approaching, they knew they must attack immediately in order to capture Paris. On the north flank, Blücher's Army of Silesia would move through Le Bourget and capture Montmartre. In the center, Barclay de Tolly would advance with the 6th Corps, the Guards, and the Reserve to oversee the attack on the Belleville heights. On the left, the Crown Prince of Württemberg with his own 4th Corps and Ignaz Gyulai's 3rd Corps would seize the forest of Vincennes and the bridges of Saint-Maur and Charenton.

=== Action ===
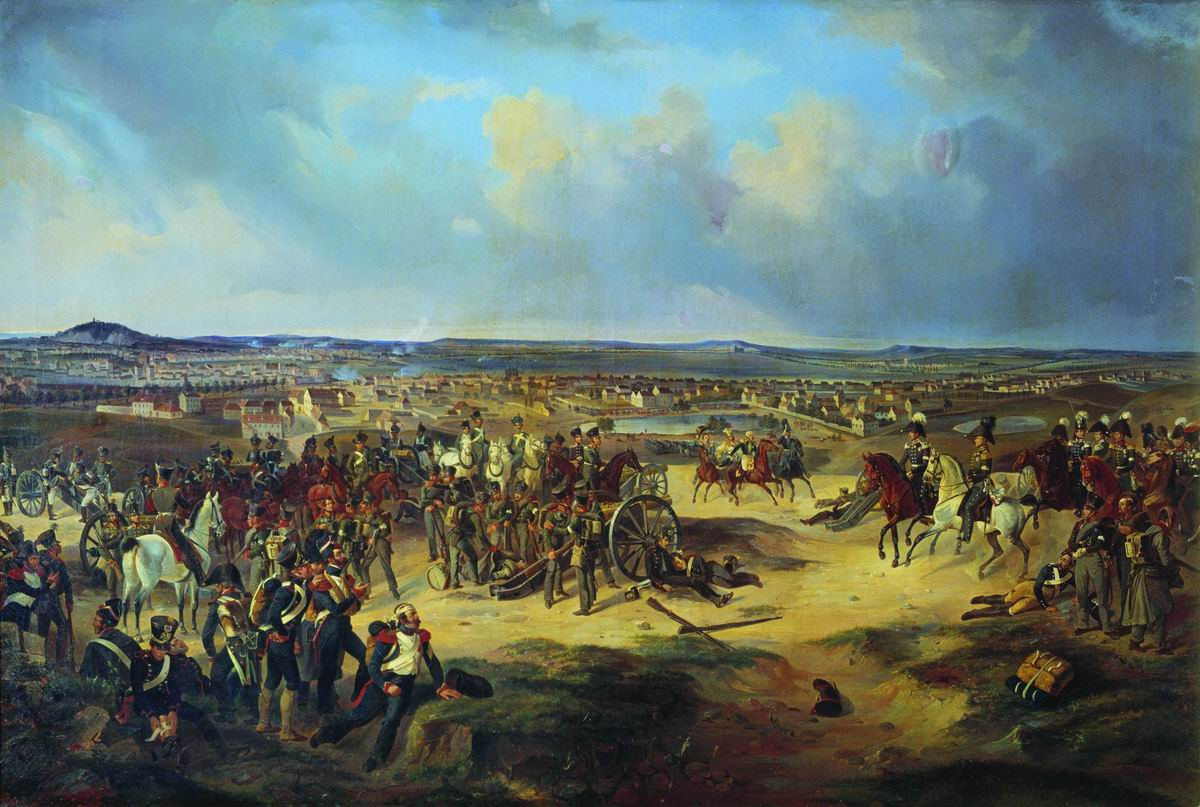
Battle of Paris by Bogdan Willewalde, 1834

The battle started with an intense artillery bombardment by the Coalition army. The Army of Silesia was spread out which caused a delay, and it would first have to capture Aubervilliers. The Crown Prince's command was also delayed and would not arrive until midday. The only Allied force ready for immediate action was the 6th Corps, under Raevsky. The all-Russian 6th Corps consisted of the 1st Corps under GL Andrei Ivanovich Gorchakov, the 2nd Infantry Corps under GL Duke Eugen of Württemberg, and GL Peter Graf von der Pahlen's cavalry division. The 1st Corps included the 5th and 14th Infantry Divisions. The 2nd Corps comprised the 3rd and 4th Infantry Divisions. Duke Eugen received his orders from Raevsky to attack at 7:00 am. The assault was supported by two cuirassier divisions from the Reserve. Barclay de Tolly additionally advanced some Reserve and Guard units.

The initial Russian assault pushed through Pantin and the Romainville woods, but it triggered a French counterattack and bitter fighting. By 9:00 am, Raevsky was compelled to commit GL Charles de Lambert's 1st and 2nd Grenadier Divisions from the Reserve. At this time, Langeron's army corps was marching through Le Bourget while its advance guard came into contact with the French defending Aubervilliers. Nevertheless, the French continued to hold their ground despite being heavily outnumbered. The Russians captured Montreuil, but otherwise Marmont's defenses remained intact. The village of Pantin became the focus of fighting. The battle in the center was in a stalemate while the right and left wings had not yet made their strength felt. As the hours went by, Barclay de Tolly became anxious that Napoleon might appear, so he decided to make an early commitment of the elite Guard units. Normally, the Guard formations were committed to action late in a battle, if at all.

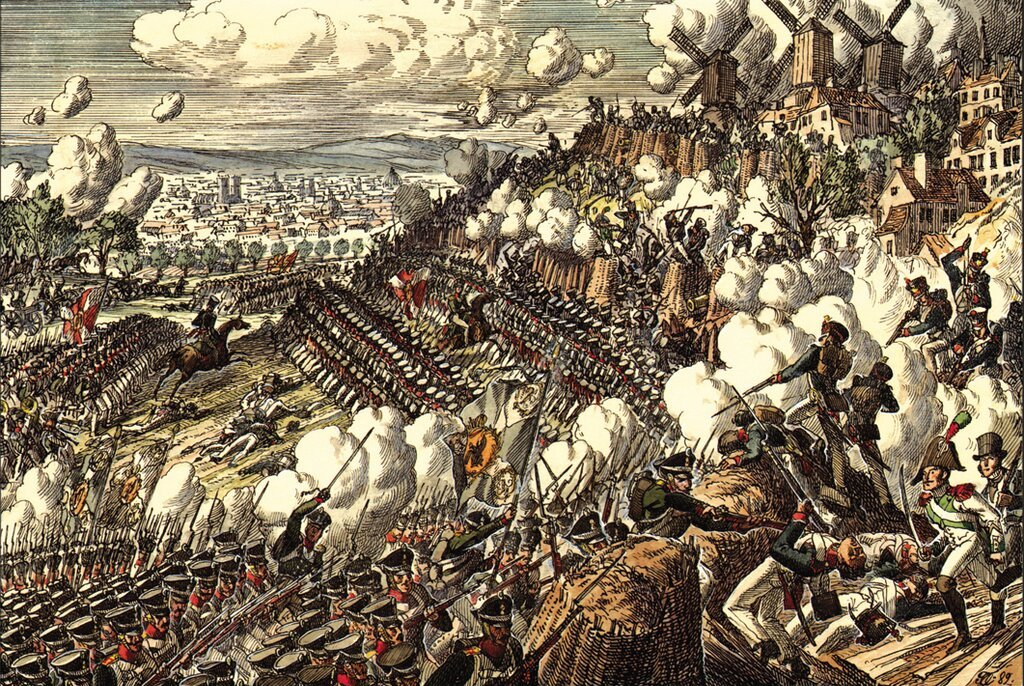
Russian army attacking Montmartre Heights

By 11:00 am, Marmont and Mortier reported to Joseph that their defenses were still holding. Joseph received a proclamation from Schwarzenberg that finally convinced him that he was fighting against two Coalition armies. Sometime later, the troops of the Army of Silesia began filling the plain north of Montmartre. At this display, Joseph panicked and authorized Marmont and Mortier to treat with the Allies for the capitulation of Paris. Joseph then fled south with some government officials. Langeron's corps from Blücher's army began moving west to outflank the French defenses. The corps of Yorck and Kleist were directed to capture La Villette. Meanwhile, the advance guard of the Army of Silesia arrived at the Ourcq Canal, crossed it, and captured La Rouvrai. At noon, the Prussian Guard emerged from Pantin, only to be repulsed in its first attack. A second thrust by the Prussian Guard captured some French guns and gained some ground. At 2:00 pm, Barclay de Tolly paused the attacks to reorganize his forces. His only uncommitted infantry units were two divisions of the Russian Imperial Guard. Marmont used the lull to reposition French units.

The Crown Prince of Württemberg's wing finally appeared and launched its main attack by the 4th Corps and the Austrian grenadiers. They rapidly seized the bridges at Saint-Maur and Charenton to the southeast of Paris and surrounded the Chateau Vincennes. A French force of 28 guns manned by poorly trained gunners advanced in an attempt to stop the 4th Corps. It was quickly overrun by Russian uhlans, but a regiment of French dragoons recaptured most of the guns. The Crown Prince captured the Saint-Mandé suburb but halted his forces at the Paris barricades. At 1:00 pm the Army of Silesia captured Aubervilliers while sending troops to mask Saint-Denis. Vorontsov's corps began attacking La Villette while Kleist's corps assaulted La Chapelle.

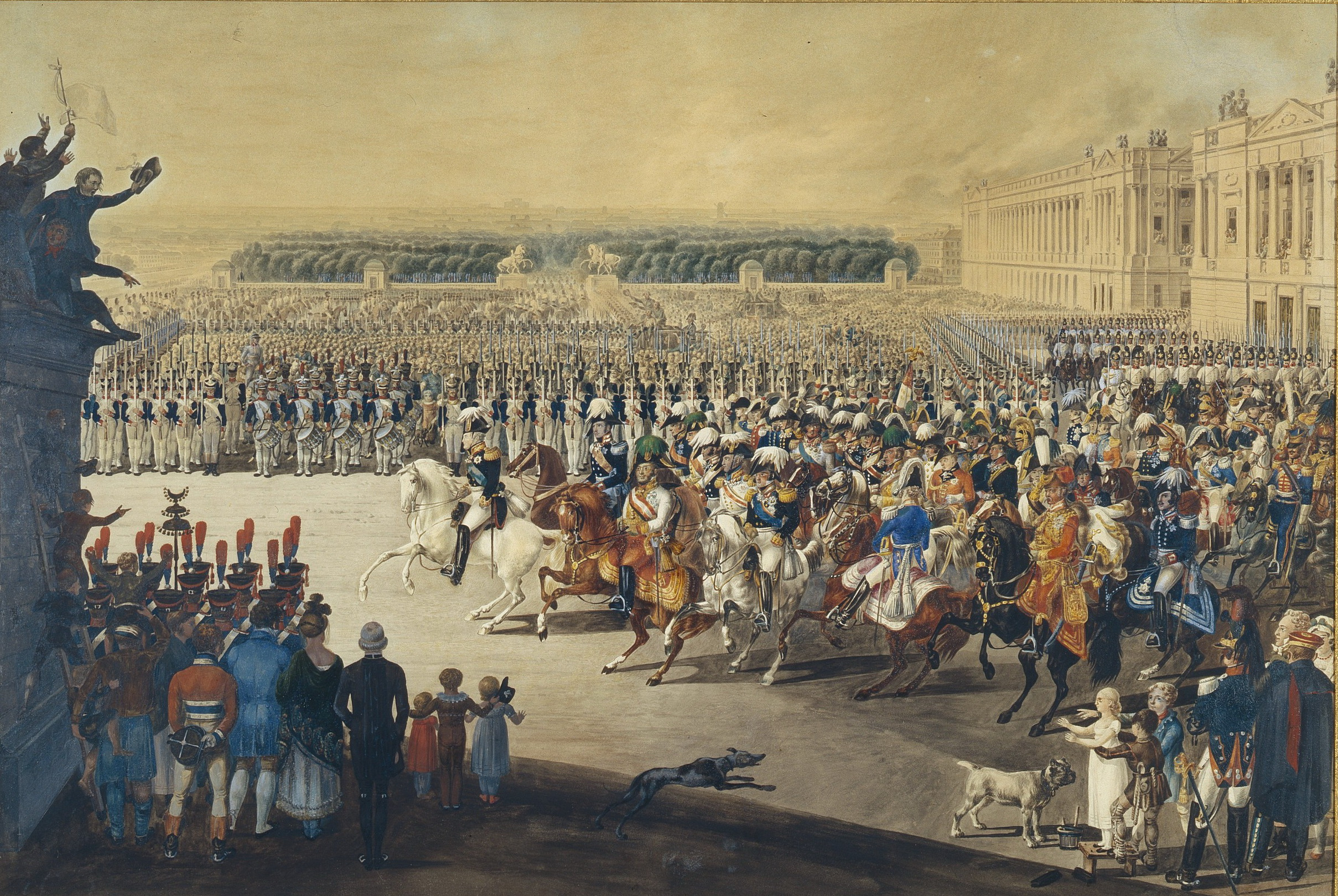
The Allied armies paraded on the Place de la Concorde.

When Blucher's army made its appearance on his right flank, Barclay de Tolly decided it was time to launch the final attack. The Russians captured Bagnolet and Charonne. The Russian Guard infantry under GL Aleksey Yermolov was finally sent into action. One 12-pounder French battery ran out of ammunition and was overrun by the Prussian Guard. The French troops in Le Pré-Saint-Gervais had to abandon the village and barely escaped to Belleville. The Prussian and Russian Guards captured Maisonettes while the Army of Silesia units captured La Villette after a bitter struggle. The survivors of Marmont's wing were forced back to Belleville in a critical situation. Therefore, Marmont chose to send a messenger through the lines to Schwarzenberg offering to accept terms.

Mortier refused a demand to surrender, but when he found that Marmont had offered to negotiate, he had to accept the same terms. At 5:00 pm, the battle was stopped. The French were required to abandon the Montmartre heights and retreat within the city of Paris. After further negotiations, it was determined that the French would evacuate Paris that night, the Allies would enter the city at 7:00 am the following day, and hostilities would not start until 9:00 am. When the Coalition armies marched into Paris on 31 March, the people shouted Vive les Bourbons! Vivent les souverains! Vivent nos libérateurs! (Long live the Bourbons! Long live the sovereigns! Long live our liberators!)

== Aftermath ==
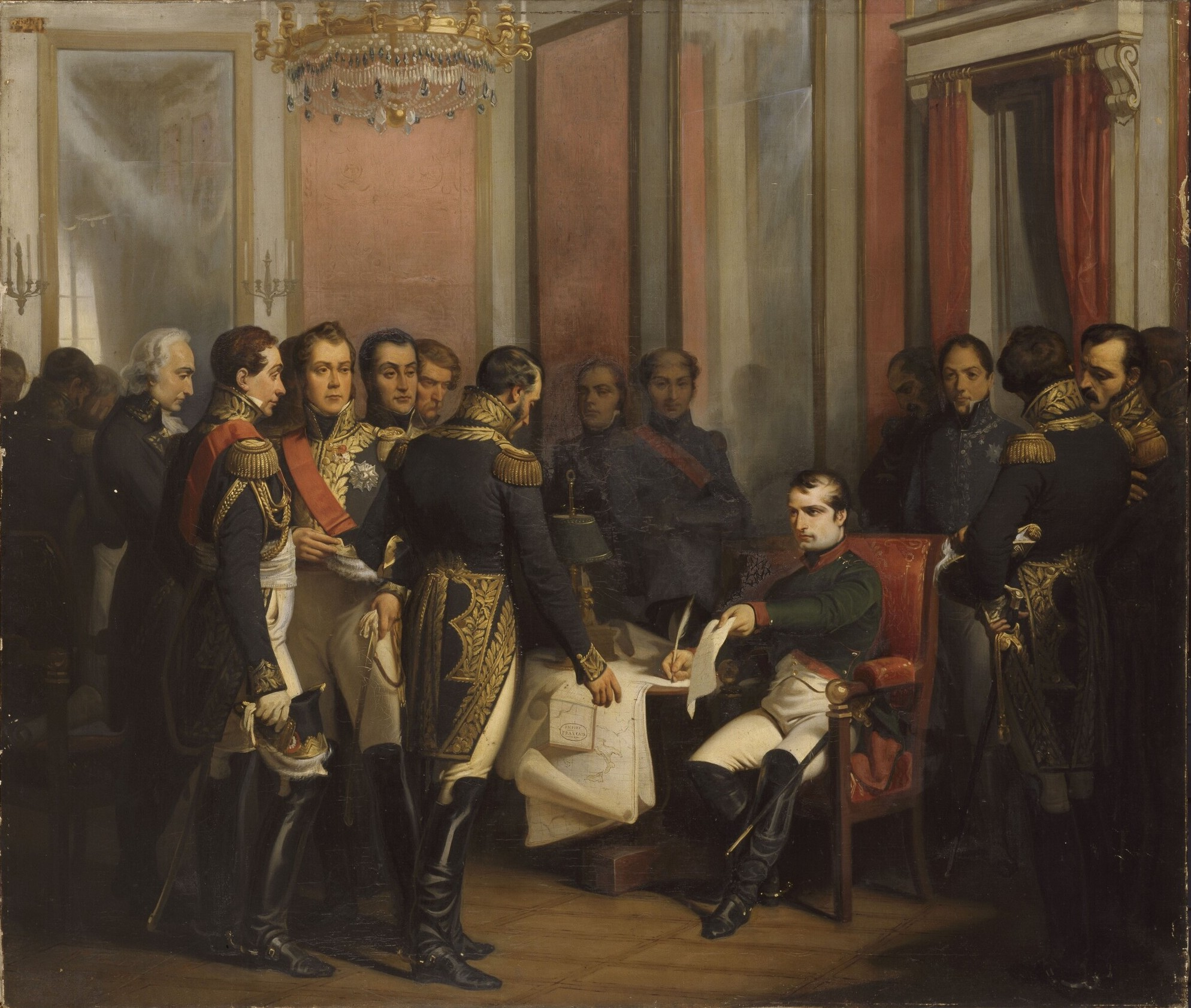
Napoleon Signing His Abdication at Fontainebleau was painted in 1843 by François Bouchot.

Digby Smith stated that the French brought 41,000 men into action and suffered losses of 4,000 killed and wounded, plus 1,000 men, 126 guns, and 2 colors captured. Allied casualties were: Russia 5,050, Prussia 1,353, Württemberg 160, Austria 82, Baden 60, for a total of 6,705. Nafziger numbered French strength as 25,526 line troops and 12,000 National Guards. He stated Coalition strength as 119,000 infantry and 26,500 cavalry, or 145,500 total. Nafziger gave no French or Russian losses but reported that total Prussian losses were 87 officers and 1,753 rank and file. Of these, the Prussian Guard lost 69 officers and 1,286 enlisted men. Gaston Bodart asserted that the Coalition victory was won by 100,000 soldiers, including 53,000 Russians, 22,000 Prussians, 15,000 Austrians, and 10,000 Württemberg and Baden troops. Total Coalition losses were 9,000 casualties including 6,200 Russians, 2,100 Prussians, and 700 others. Bodart gave French strength as 42,000 and losses as 7,000 dead and wounded plus 2,300 captured for a total of 9,300 casualties.

Talleyrand assembled a rump government in Paris while he ingratiated himself to Tsar Alexander. Meanwhile, Napoleon raced ahead of his army with only five officers as an escort, reaching Essonnes on 31 March. He was met by GD Augustin Daniel Belliard who commanded the cavalry that had defended Paris. Belliard explained that Paris had fallen. By 1 April, Napoleon massed 36,000 troops at Fontainebleau. Napoleon toyed with the idea of abdicating in favor of his son Napoleon II, but the Allied leaders vetoed that possibility. On 2 April, pushed by Talleyrand, the Senate voted to depose Napoleon and his entire family in the Acte de déchéance de l'Empereur ("Emperor's Demise Act").

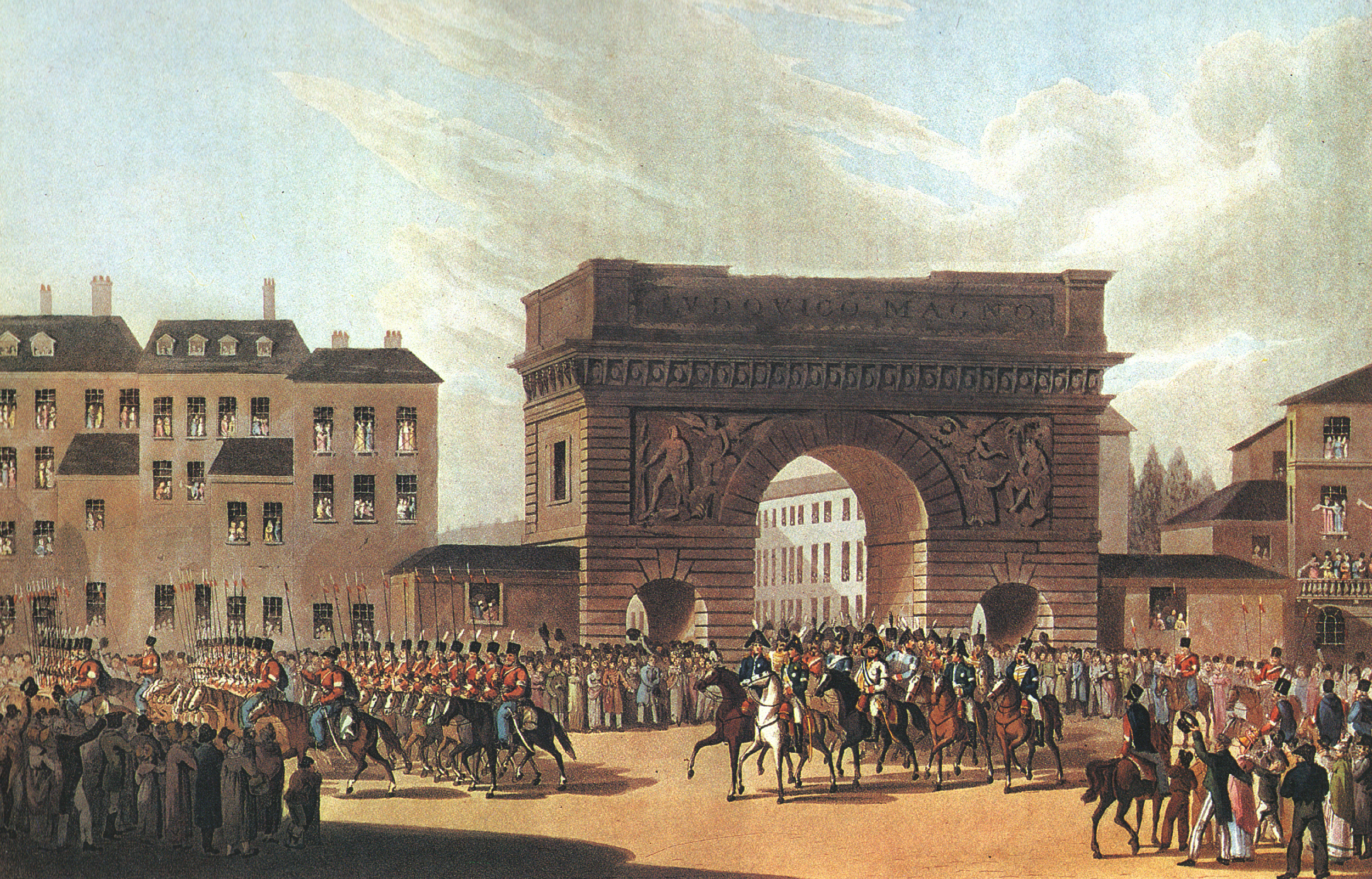
Russian army enters Paris

Napoleon was grossly outnumbered by the 145,000 Allied troops around Paris. Still, he dreamed of continuing the struggle. On 3 April, Napoleon deployed the French army south of Paris with its right flank at Melun and its left flank at La Ferté-Aleps (La Ferté-Alais). At a meeting with his generals, Marshal Michel Ney insisted, "The army will not march." Napoleon replied, "The army will obey me." Ney asserted, "The army will obey its chiefs." Meanwhile, Marmont signed a secret agreement with the new French government and Schwarzenberg. According to the agreement, Marmont would neutralize his corps, removing it from Napoleon's army. On 4 April, while several of Napoleon's marshals negotiated with the Allied leaders, Marmont's corps marched away to Versailles under the command of Joseph Souham. Most of the French soldiers did not realize what was happening until they were surrounded by Coalition forces. Altogether, 11,000 men were thus subtracted from Napoleon's army. Napoleon finally abdicated unconditionally in the Treaty of Fontainebleau on 11 April 1814. The Senate had already proclaimed Louis XVIII king of France.

== See also ==
- Military career of Napoleon Bonaparte
- Parizh, a Cossack settlement named to honour the battle.
- Freiwilliges Feldjäger-Korps von Schmidt
- Medal "For the Capture of Paris", Russian decoration for those who participated in the action.

== Notes ==
Footnotes

Citations

Preceded by Battle of Saint-Dizier	Napoleonic Wars; Battle of Paris (1814)	Succeeded by Battle of Toulouse (1814)
