= Méry-sur-Seine =

Commune in Grand Est, France

- Commune
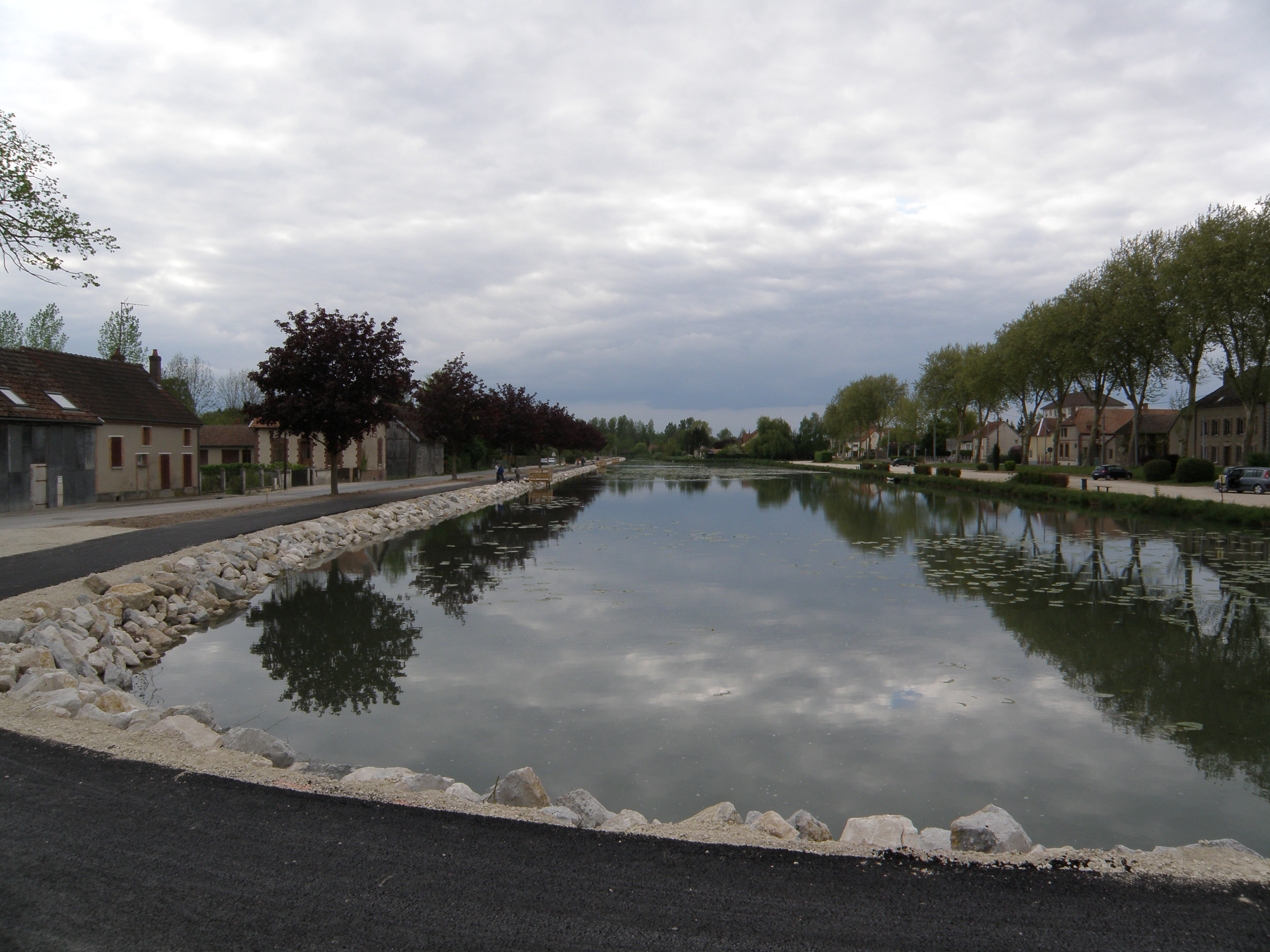
- The Haute-Seine canal in Méry-sur-Seine

- Coat of arms
- Location of Méry-sur-Seine
- Location within France Location within Grand Est
- Coordinates: 48°30′41″N 3°53′25″E
- Country: France
- Region: Grand Est
- Department: Aube
- Arrondissement: Nogent-sur-Seine
- Canton: Creney-près-Troyes

Government
  - Mayor (2020–2026): Carmen Labille
- Area^{1}: 12.42 km^{2} (4.80 sq mi)
- Elevation: 82 m (269 ft)
- Population (2023): 1,431
  - Density: 115.2/km^{2} (298.4/sq mi)
- Time zone: UTC+01:00 (CET)
  - Summer (DST): UTC+02:00 (CEST)
- INSEE/Postal code: 10233 /10170
- Website: www.mery-sur-seine.fr
- ^{1} French Land Register data, which excludes lakes, ponds, glaciers > 1 km^{2} (0.386 sq mi or 247 acres) and river estuaries.

Méry-sur-Seine (French pronunciation: [meʁi syʁ sɛn]; lit. 'Méry-on-Seine') is a commune in the Aube department in north-central France.

== Population ==
Historical population
| Year | Pop. | ±% p.a. |
|---|---|---|
| 1968 | 1,109 | — |
| 1975 | 1,174 | +0.82% |
| 1982 | 1,254 | +0.95% |
| 1990 | 1,302 | +0.47% |
| 1999 | 1,326 | +0.20% |
| 2007 | 1,380 | +0.50% |
| 2012 | 1,489 | +1.53% |
| 2017 | 1,526 | +0.49% |
| 2023 | 1,431 | −1.07% |
Source: INSEE

== See also ==
- Communes of the Aube department
