= List of battles of the War of the Sixth Coalition =

This is a list of sieges, land and naval battles of the War of the Sixth Coalition (3 March 1813 – 30 May 1814). It includes:

- the German campaign of 1813;
- the campaign in north-east France;
- the Campaign in south-west France (final stage of the Peninsular War);
- the Illyrian campaign, part of the wider Adriatic campaign of 1807–1814;
- the Italian campaign (6 September 1813 – 18 April 1814); and
- the Low Countries campaign (12 November 1813 – 12 May 1814)
- Dano-Swedish War (1813-1814) (the final coalition campaign against Denmark)
War of the Sixth Coalition:
German campaign of 1813
Napoleon in command
Napoleon not in command

It does not include the Swedish–Norwegian War of 1814

War of the Sixth Coalition:
Campaign in north-east France
Napoleon in command
Napoleon not in command
Peninsular War:
Campaign in south-west France
War of the Sixth Coalition:
Low Countries campaign of 1813–14

Date	Battle	Front	French forces	Coalition forces	Notes
16 January 1813 – 2 January 1814	Siege of Danzig (1813)	German	(France) France; Confederation of the Rhine; Kingdom of Bavaria; Kingdom of Saxony	Kingdom of Prussia; Russian Empire	Coalition victory
26 January 1813 – 4 April 1813	Siege of Torun (1813)	Campaign of Poland	Duchy of Warsaw	Kingdom of Prussia; Russian Empire	Coalition victory
10 February 1813	Battle of Rozogne	Campaign of Poland	Duchy of Warsaw	Kingdom of Prussia; Russian Empire	Coalition victory
12 February 1813	Battle of Sierakow	Campaign of Poland	Duchy of Warsaw	Kingdom of Prussia; Russian Empire	Coalition victory
13 or 18 February 1813	Battle of Kalisz	Campaign of Poland	Duchy of Warsaw	Kingdom of Prussia; Russian Empire	Coalition victory
26 February 1813 - 4 April 1813	Siege of Jasna Gora	Campaign of Poland	Duchy of Warsaw	Kingdom of Prussia; Russian Empire	Coalition victory
1 March 1813 - 20 March 1814	Siege of Kustrin	German	France	Kingdom of Prussia; Russian Empire	Coalition victory
1 March 1813 - 30 November 1813	Siege of Stettin	German	France	Kingdom of Prussia; Russian Empire	Coalition victory
15 March 1813 - 10 April 1814	Siege of Glogau	German	France	Kingdom of Prussia; Russian Empire	Coalition victory
2 April 1813	Battle of Luneburg	German	France	Kingdom of Prussia; Russian Empire	Coalition victory
5 April 1813	Battle of Möckern	German	France	Kingdom of Prussia; Russian Empire	Coalition victory
10 April 1813	Battle of Bilbao	Peninsular	France	United Kingdom; Kingdom of Portugal (Spain) Regency Council	French victory
11 April 1813	Battle of Yecla	Peninsular	France	United Kingdom; Kingdom of Portugal (Spain) Regency Council	French victory
11-12 April 1813	Siege of Villena	Peninsular	France	United Kingdom; Kingdom of Portugal (Spain) Regency Council	French victory
29 April 1813	Battle of Weissenfels	German	France	Kingdom of Prussia; Russian Empire	French victory
29 April 1813	Battle of Merseburg	German	France	Kingdom of Prussia; Russian Empire	French victory
2 May 1813	Battle of Lützen (1813)	German	France; Napoleonic Italy (Grand Duchy of Hesse) Gr. Duchy of Hesse	Kingdom of Prussia; Russian Empire	French costly victory
20–21 May 1813	Battle of Bautzen (1813)	German	France	Kingdom of Prussia; Russian Empire	French costly victory
21 May 1813	Battle of Wurschen	German	France	Kingdom of Prussia; Russian Empire	French victory
22 May 1813	Battle of Reichenbach	German	France	Kingdom of Prussia; Russian Empire	French victory
22 May 1813	Battle of Alcalá de Henares	Peninsular	France	United Kingdom; Kingdom of Portugal (Spain) Regency Council	Coalition victory
26 May 1813	Battle of Haynau	German	France	Kingdom of Prussia	Coalition victory
22 May 1813	Battle of Hoyerswerda	German	France	Kingdom of Prussia; Russian Empire	French victory
3-11 June 1813	Siege of Tarragona	Peninsular	France	United Kingdom; Kingdom of Portugal (Spain) Regency Council	French victory
4 June 1813	Battle of Luckau	German	France	Kingdom of Prussia; Russian Empire	Coalition victory
13 June 1813	Battle of Carcagente	Peninsular	France	United Kingdom; Kingdom of Portugal (Spain) Regency Council	French victory
21 June 1813	Battle of Vitoria	Peninsular	France	United Kingdom; Kingdom of Portugal (Spain) Regency Council	Coalition victory
25 July 1813	Battle of Maya	Peninsular	France	United Kingdom; Kingdom of Portugal (Spain) Regency Council	French victory
25 July 1813	Battle of Ronceveaux Pass	Peninsular	France	United Kingdom; Kingdom of Portugal (Spain) Regency Council	French victory
30 July 1813 - 1 August 1813	Battle of Sorauren	Peninsular	France	United Kingdom; Kingdom of Portugal (Spain) Regency Council	Coalition victory
2 August 1813	Battle of Lizaso	Peninsular	France	United Kingdom; Kingdom of Portugal (Spain) Regency Council	Unknown
12 August 1813 - 18 May 1814	Siege of Tortosa	Peninsular	France	United Kingdom; Kingdom of Portugal (Spain) Regency Council	Siege ended
18 August 1813	Battle of Lauenburg	German	France	Kingdom of Prussia; Russian Empire	French victory
19 August 1813	Battle of Helle	German	France	Kingdom of Prussia; Russian Empire	French victory
19 August 1813	Battle of Amposta	Peninsular	France	United Kingdom; Kingdom of Portugal (Spain) Regency Council	French victory
19 August 1813	Battle of the Bobr	German	France	Kingdom of Prussia; Russian Empire	French victory
23 August 1813	Battle of Goldberg	German	France	Kingdom of Prussia; Russian Empire	French victory
23 August 1813	Battle of Großbeeren	German	France; Kingdom of Saxony	Kingdom of Prussia; Russian Empire; Kingdom of Sweden	Coalition victory
26 August 1813	Battle of the Katzbach	German	France	Kingdom of Prussia; Russian Empire	Coalition victory
26–27 August 1813	Battle of Dresden	German	France; Kingdom of Saxony	Austrian Empire; Kingdom of Prussia; Russian Empire	French victory
27 August 1813	Battle of Hagelberg	German	France; Kingdom of Saxony; Kingdom of Westphalia	Kingdom of Prussia; Russian Empire	Coalition victory
29–30 August 1813	Battle of Kulm	German	France	Austrian Empire; Kingdom of Prussia; Russian Empire	Coalition victory
4 September 1813	Battle of Wohlenberg	German	France	Kingdom of Prussia; Russian Empire	French victory
6 September 1813	Battle of Dennewitz	German	France	Kingdom of Prussia; Russian Empire; Kingdom of Sweden	Coalition victory
6 September 1813	Battle of Feistritz	Italian	France	Austrian Empire	French victory
7 September 1813	Battle of Lippa	Illyrian; Adriatic	France; Napoleonic Italy	Austrian Empire	Coalition victory
15 September 1813 - 20 May 1814	Siege of Magdeburg	German	France	Kingdom of Prussia; Russian Empire	Siege ended
12-13 September 1813	Battle of Villafranca	Peninsular	France	United Kingdom; Kingdom of Portugal (Spain) Regency Council	French victory
12 September 1813	Battle of Ordal	Peninsular	France	United Kingdom; Kingdom of Portugal (Spain) Regency council	French victory
16 September 1813	Battle of the Göhrde	German	France	Kingdom of Prussia; Russian Empire; United Kingdom	Coalition victory
17 September 1813	Second Battle of Kulm	German	France	Austrian Empire; Kingdom of Prussia; Russian Empire	Coalition victory
20 September 1813 - 25 January 1814	Siege of Lleida	Peninsular	France	United Kingdom; Kingdom of Portugal; Restoration Spain	Coalition victory
28 September 1813	Battle of Altenburg	German	France (Grand Duchy of Baden) Gr. Duchy of Baden	Austrian Empire; Kingdom of Prussia; Russian Empire	Coalition victory
29 September 1813	Combat of Rosslau	German	France	Kingdom of Sweden	Coalition victory
3 October 1813	Battle of Wartenburg	German	France	Kingdom of Prussia	Coalition victory
5 October 1813	Battle of Colditz	German	France	Kingdom of Prussia	Coalition victory
7 October 1813	Battle of the Bridge of Vera	SW France; Peninsular	France	United Kingdom; Kingdom of Portugal (Spain) Regency Council	French victory
7 October 1813	Battle of the Bidassoa	SW France; Peninsular	France	United Kingdom; Kingdom of Portugal (Spain) Regency Council	Coalition victory
10 October 1813	Battle of Wetha	German	France	Kingdom of Prussia	French victory
10 October – 11 November 1813	Siege of Dresden (1813)	German	France	Austrian Empire; Russian Empire	Coalition victory
10 October - 29 October 1813	Siege of Trieste	Adriatic	France	Kingdom of Prussia; Austrian Empire; United Kingdom	Coalition victory
14 October 1813 – 3 January 1814	Siege of Cattaro	Illyrian; Adriatic	France	United Kingdom (Prince-Bishopric of Montenegro) P.B. of Montenegro; Kingdom of Sicily	Coalition victory
16–19 October 1813	Battle of Leipzig	German	France; (Grand Duchy of Baden) Gr. Duchy of Baden; Duchy of Warsaw; Napoleonic Italy; (Kingdom of Naples) Napoleonic Naples; Kingdom of Saxony (Note: Saxony and Württemberg defected to the allies on 18 October.); (Kingdom of Württemberg) K. of Württemberg	Russian Empire; Austrian Empire; Kingdom of Prussia; Kingdom of Sweden; (Grand Duchy of Mecklenburg-Schwerin) Mecklenburg-Schwerin; Kingdom of Saxony; (Kingdom of Württemberg) K. of Württemberg	Coalition victory
18 October 1813 – 10 January 1814	Siege of Torgau	German	France	Kingdom of Prussia	Coalition victory
25 October 1813 - 5 May 1814	Siege of Erfurt	German	France	Kingdom of Prussia; Russian Empire	Siege ended
30–31 October 1813	Battle of Hanau	German	France	Kingdom of Bavaria (Note: By the Treaty of Ried of 8 October 1813 with Austria, Bavaria left the Confederation of the Rhine to join the Sixth Coalition. On 14 October, Bavaria declared war on Napoleon's French Empire after 12 years of Franco-Bavarian alliance.); Austrian Empire	French victory
9 November 1813	Battle of Ala	Italian	France; Napoleonic Italy	Austrian Empire	French victory
10 November 1813	Battle of Nivelle	SW France; Peninsular	France	United Kingdom; Kingdom of Portugal; Restoration Spain	Coalition victory
13 November 1813 – 23 May 1814	Siege of Delfzijl (1813–1814)	Low Countries	France	Kingdom of Prussia; Triumvirate of 1813 (Kingdom of the Netherlands) United Netherlands	Coalition victory
15 November 1813	Battle of Caldiero (1813)	Italian	France	Austrian Empire	French victory
16 November 1813	Amsterdam Uprising (1813)	Low Countries	France	Triumvirate of 1813 (Kingdom of the Netherlands) United Netherlands	Coalition victory
17 November 1813 – 12 May 1814	Siege of Naarden (1813–1814)	Low Countries	France	Triumvirate of 1813 (Kingdom of the Netherlands) United Netherlands; Russian Empire	Coalition victory
22 November – 5 December 1813	Siege of Zara (1813)	Illyrian; Adriatic	France; Napoleonic Italy	United Kingdom; Austrian Empire	Coalition victory
24 November 1813	Defense of Woerden	Low Countries	France: Prussian Regiment (Note: The Prussian Regiment consisted of mostly Prussian prisoners of war turned into soldiers in French service. During the War of the Sixth Coalition, they defended the Low Countries departments of the French Empire against Coalition forces and Dutch rebels.)	Triumvirate of 1813: Hague Orange Guard (Note: The Orange Guard of The Hague was established on 20 November 1813 from Dutch militiamen serving in the French National Guard garrisoned at The Hague; as such, they were engaged in mutiny against the French Imperial government.)	French victory
30 November 1813	Battle of Arnhem (1813)	Low Countries	France	Kingdom of Prussia	Coalition victory
1-2 December 1813	Battle of Rovigo	Italian	France; Napoleonic Italy	United Kingdom	French victory
7 December 1813	Battle of Bornhöved (1813)	German	Denmark–Norway	Kingdom of Sweden	Coalition victory
8 December 1813	Battle of Boara	Italian	France; Napoleonic Italy	Austrian Empire	Italian victory
9–13 December 1813	Battle of the Nive	SW France; Peninsular	France	United Kingdom; Kingdom of Portugal; Restoration Spain	Coalition victory
10 December 1813	Battle of Sehested	German	Denmark–Norway	Russian Empire; Kingdom of Prussia; United Kingdom; Electorate of Hanover; Mecklenburg-Schwerin	French victory
12 December 1813	Battle of Barrouillet	SW France; Peninsular	France	United Kingdom; Kingdom of Portugal; Restoration Spain	Coalition victory
13 December 1813	Battle of Saint Pierre d’Irube	SW France; Peninsular	France	United Kingdom; Kingdom of Portugal; Restoration Spain	Coalition victory
14 December 1814	Battle of Treporti	Italian	France; Napoleonic Italy	Austrian Empire	French Victory
14 December 1813	Battle of Livorno(1814)	Italian	France	United Kingdom	French victory
15 December 1813 - 20 April 1814	Siege of Venice	Italian	France; Napoleonic Italy	Austrian Empire	Coalition Victory
19–22 December 1813	Siege of Breda (1813)	Low Countries	France	Russian Empire; United Netherlands; Kingdom of Prussia	Coalition victory
21 December 1813-14 April 1814	Siege of Huningue	France	France	Austrian Empire	Coalition victory
24 December 1813 – 12 May 1814	Siege of Hamburg	German	France	Russian Empire	Indecisive
31 December 1813	Battle of Saint Croixe-en-Plaine	France	France	Austrian Empire	French Victory
5 January-2 May 1814	Siege of Besançon	France	France	Austrian Empire	Siege ended
??? – ???	Siege of Bitche	Campaign of France	France	Kingdom of Prussia; Russian Empire	Siege ended
??? – ???	Siege of Landau	Campaign of France	France	Kingdom of Prussia; Russian Empire	Siege ended
??? – 12 April 1814	Siege of Belfort	Campaign of France	France	Austrian Empire	Siege ended
3 January – 4 May 1814	Siege of Mainz (1814)	German	France	Russian Empire; Grand Duchy of Berg; Duchy of Nassau	Siege ended
5 January – 13 April 1814	Siege of Strasbourg	Campaign of France	France	Kingdom of Prussia; Russian Empire	Siege ended
9 January – 14 April 1814	Siege of Thionville	Campaign of France	France	Kingdom of Prussia; Russian Empire	Siege ended
15 January – 3 May 1814	Siege of Luxembourg	Campaign of France	France	Kingdom of Prussia; Russian Empire	Siege ended
11 January 1814	Battle of Hoogstraten	Low Countries	France	Kingdom of Prussia; United Kingdom; Russian Empire	Coalition victory
14 January – 4 May 1814	Siege of Antwerp (1814)	Low Countries	France	Kingdom of Prussia; United Kingdom	Coalition victory
16 January 1814 - 15 February 1814	Siege of Ancona (1814)	Italian	France; Napoleonic Italy	Kingdom of Naples	Coalition Victory
16 January 1814 - April or May 1814	Siege of Barcelona	Peninsular	France	United Kingdom; Kingdom of Portugal; Restoration Spain	Siege ended
17 January – 10 April 1814	Siege of Metz (1814)	Campaign of France	France	Kingdom of Prussia; Russian Empire; Electorate of Hesse	French victory
19–27 January 1814	Siege of Ragusa	Illyrian; Adriatic	France	United Kingdom; Austrian Empire; Republic of Ragusa	Coalition victory
24 January 1814	First Battle of Bar-sur-Aube	Campaign of France	France	Austrian Empire (Kingdom of Württemberg) K. of Württemberg	Indecisive
Late January – 5 May 1814	Blockade of Maastricht (1814)	Low Countries	France	Austrian Empire; Kingdom of Prussia; Russian Empire; Sweden–Norway; United Kingdom (Kingdom of the Netherlands) United Netherlands	Coalition victory
29 January 1814	Battle of Brienne	Campaign of France	France	Kingdom of Prussia; Russian Empire	French victory
1 February 1814	Battle of La Rothière	Campaign of France	France	Austrian Empire; Kingdom of Prussia; Russian Empire; Kingdom of Bavaria (Kingdom of Württemberg) K. of Württemberg	Coalition victory
2 February 1814	Battle of Lesmont	Campaign of France	France	Russian Empire; Kingdom of Bavaria	French victory
8 February 1814	Battle of the Mincio River (1814)	Italian	France; Napoleonic Italy	Austrian Empire	Inconclusive
10 February 1814	Battle of Champaubert	Campaign of France; Six Days'	France	Russian Empire	French victory
11 February 1814	Battle of Montmirail	Campaign of France; Six Days'	France	Russian Empire; Kingdom of Prussia	French victory
12 February 1814	Battle of Château-Thierry (1814)	Campaign of France; Six Days'	France	Russian Empire; Kingdom of Prussia	French victory
12-14 February 1814	Siege of Soissons	Campaign of France	France	Russian Empire	Coalition victory
14 February 1814	Battle of Vauchamps	Campaign of France; Six Days'	France	Russian Empire; Kingdom of Prussia	French victory
15 February 1814	Battle of Garris	SW France; Peninsular	France	United Kingdom; Kingdom of Portugal; Restoration Spain	Coalition victory
16 February 1814	Battle of Salo (1814)	Italian	France; Napoleonic Italy	Austrian Empire	Italian victory
17 February 1814	Battle of Mormant	Campaign of France	France	Austrian Empire; Russian Empire; Kingdom of Bavaria	French victory
18 February 1814	Battle of Montereau	Campaign of France	France	Austrian Empire (Kingdom of Württemberg) K. of Württemberg	French victory
14 February 1814	Battle of Montargis	Campaign of France	France	Russian Empire	French victory
22 February 1814	Battle of Méry	Campaign of France	France	Austrian Empire	Siege ended
27 February 1814	Battle of Orthez	SW France; Peninsular	France	United Kingdom; Kingdom of Portugal; Restoration Spain	Coalition victory
27 February 1814	Battle of Bar-sur-Aube	Campaign of France	France	Austrian Empire; Russian Empire; Kingdom of Bavaria	Coalition victory
28 February – 1 March 1814	Battle of Gué-à-Tresmes	Campaign of France	France	Kingdom of Prussia; Russian Empire	French victory
1 March 1814	Battle of Saint-Julien (1814)	Campaign of France	France	Austrian Empire	Coalition victory
2 March 1814	Battle of Parma (1814)	Italian	France	Austrian Empire	French Victory
2-3 March 1814	Battle of Soissons	Campaign of France	France; Duchy of Warsaw	Kingdom of Prussia	Coalition victory
3 March 1814	Battle of Laubressel	Campaign of France	France	Austrian Empire; Kingdom of Prussia; Russian Empire; Kingdom of Bavaria (Kingdom of Württemberg) K. of Württemberg	Coalition victory
5 March 1814	Battle of Berry-au-Bac	Campaign of France	France	Kingdom of Prussia; Russian Empire	French victory
5-6 March 1814	Battle of Soissons	Campaign of France	France	Russian Empire	Coalition victory
7 March 1814	Battle of Craonne	Campaign of France	France	Kingdom of Prussia; Russian Empire	French victory
8 March 1814	Siege of Bergen op Zoom (1814)	Low Countries	France	United Kingdom	French victory
9–10 March 1814	Battle of Laon	Campaign of France	France	Kingdom of Prussia; Russian Empire	Coalition victory
11 March 1814	Battle of Mâcon (1814)	Campaign of France	France	Austrian Empire	Coalition victory
12–13 March 1814	Battle of Reims (1814)	Campaign of France	France	Kingdom of Prussia; Russian Empire	French victory
18 March - 5 May 1814	Siege of Maubeuge	Campaign of France	France	Russian Empire	French victory
20 March 1814	Battle of Limonest	Campaign of France	France	Austrian Empire (Grand Duchy of Hesse) Gr. Duchy of Hesse	Coalition victory
20 March 1814	Battle of Tarbes	SW France; Peninsular	France	United Kingdom; Kingdom of Portugal; Restoration Spain	Coalition victory
20–21 March 1814	Battle of Arcis-sur-Aube	Campaign of France	France	Austrian Empire; Russian Empire; Kingdom of Bavaria (Kingdom of Württemberg) K. of Württemberg	Coalition victory
20-31 March 1814	Siege of Soissons	Campaign of France	France	Russian Empire	Coalition victory
24 March 1814	Battle of Étauliers	SW France; Peninsular	France	United Kingdom; Kingdom of Portugal; Restoration Spain	Coalition victory
25 March 1814	Battle of Fère-Champenoise	Campaign of France	France	Austrian Empire; Kingdom of Prussia; Russian Empire (Kingdom of Württemberg) K. of Württemberg	Coalition victory
26 March 1814	Battle of Saint-Dizier	Campaign of France	France	Russian Empire	French victory
27 March 1814	Battle of Meaux	Campaign of France	France	Austrian Empire; Kingdom of Prussia; Russian Empire	Coalition victory
28 March 1814	Battle of Claye	Campaign of France	France	Kingdom of Prussia; Russian Empire	Inconclusive
30–31 March 1814	Battle of Paris (1814)	Campaign of France	France	Austrian Empire; Kingdom of Prussia; Russian Empire	Coalition victory Treaty of Fontainebleau
31 March 1814	Battle of Courtrai (1814)	Low Countries	France	Kingdom of Saxony; Kingdom of Prussia	French victory
April 1814 - 4 June 1814	Siege of Figueras (1814)	Peninsular	France	United Kingdom; Kingdom of Portugal; Restoration Spain	Siege ended
10 April 1814	Battle of Toulouse (1814)	SW France; Peninsular	France	United Kingdom; Restoration Spain; Kingdom of Portugal	Inconclusive
13–18 April 1814	Siege of Genoa (1814)	Italian	France	United Kingdom; Kingdom of Sicily (Genoa) Genoese militia Kingdom of Sardinia	Coalition victory
14 April 1814	Battle of Bayonne	SW France; Peninsular	France	United Kingdom; Kingdom of Portugal; Restoration Spain	Coalition victory

== See also ==
- List of battles of the War of the First Coalition
- List of battles of the War of the Second Coalition
- List of battles of the War of the Third Coalition
- List of battles of the War of the Fourth Coalition
- List of battles of the War of the Fifth Coalition
- List of battles of the Hundred Days (War of the Seventh Coalition)
- List of battles of the French invasion of Russia

== Sources ==
- Dempsey, Guy (2016). Napoleon's Mercenaries: Foreign Units of the French Army Under the Consulate and Empire, 1799 to 1814. Pen and Sword. p. 352. ISBN 9781784380199.
- Kossmann, Ernst Heinrich (1986). De Lage Landen 1780–1980 (2 delen). Amsterdam: Agon. p. 478. ISBN 90-5157-043-0. (dbnl.org e-book)
- Pawly, Ronald (2012). Wellington's Dutch Allies 1815. Oxford: Bloomsbury Publishing. pp. 4–6. ISBN 9781780965628.
- Weil, Maurice (1891). The campaign of France. Paris: Librairie militaire de L. Baudoin. p. 2159.
- Nafziger & Marco Gioannini, George & Marco (2002). The Defense of the Napoleonic Kingdom of Northern Italy, 1813–1814 (PDF). Westport, London: Praeger. p. 41.
- Oman, Charles (1930). A History of the Peninsular War (Volume VII). Oxford: Clarendon press. p. 574. ISBN 9781853672149.
- Łukasiewicz, Mariusz (1986). Armia księcia Józefa 1813. Warsaw: Clarendon press. p. 574. ISBN 83-11-07174-8.
