= Battle of the Nive =

1813 battle of the campaign in south-west France

- Part of the campaign in south-west France
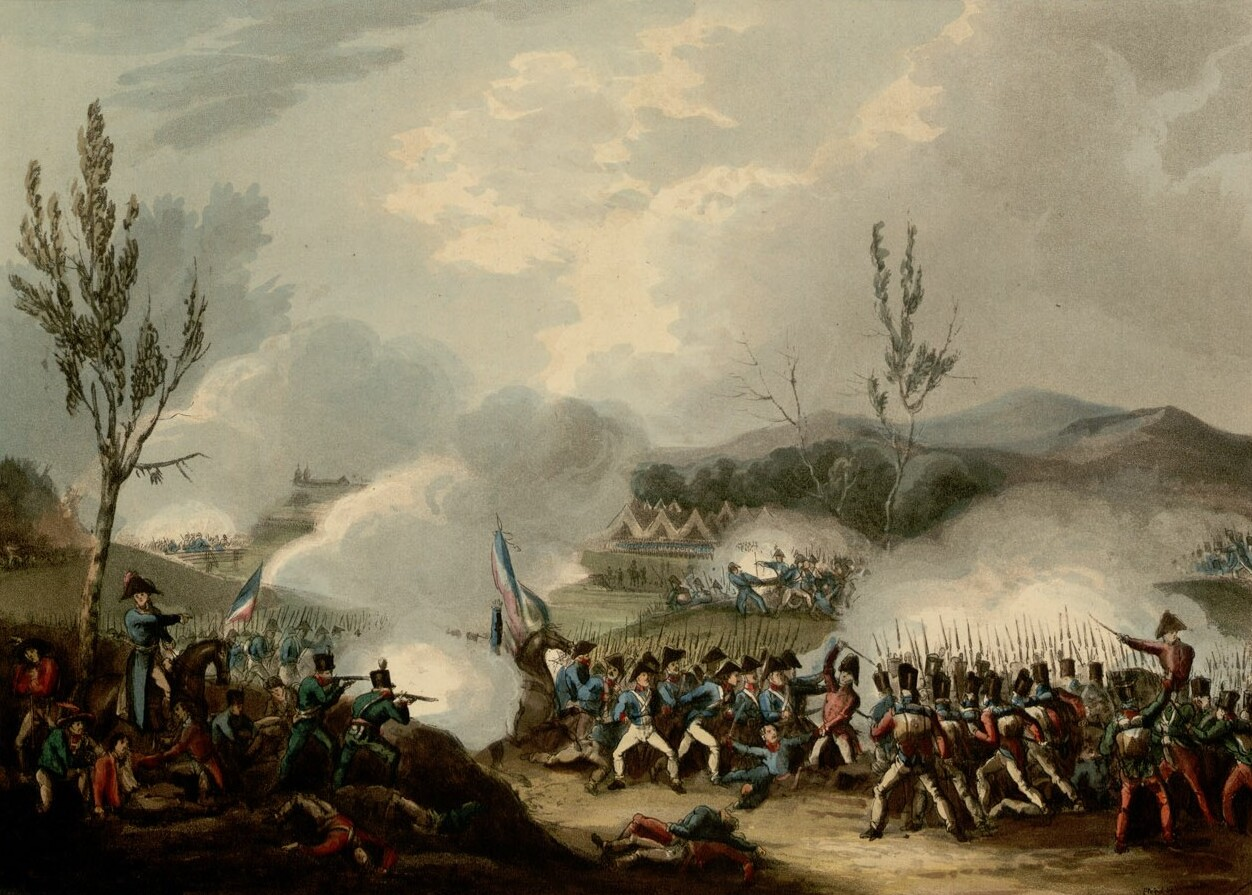
- Engraving of the battle by Thomas Sutherland
Date	9–13 December 1813
Location	Near Bayonne, Basses-Pyrénées 43.4563°N 1.4892°W
Result	Coalition victory

Belligerents
United Kingdom; Portugal; Spain	France

Commanders and leaders
(United Kingdom of Great Britain and Ireland) Arthur Wellesley (Kingdom of Portugal) Luís do Rego	(First French Empire) Jean-de-Dieu Soult

Strength
70,000	50,000

Casualties and losses
4,600 killed or wounded 500 captured	5,400 killed or wounded 600 captured 16 guns
- Location within Europe

Peninsular War:
Campaign in south-west France
current battle

The Battles of the Nive (9–13 December 1813) were fought towards the end of the Peninsular War. Arthur Wellesley, Marquess of Wellington's Anglo-Portuguese and Spanish army defeated Marshal Jean-de-Dieu Soult's army on French soil in a series of battles near the city of Bayonne. Unusually, for most of the battle, Wellington remained with the Reserve delegating command to his senior Lieutenant-Generals Rowland Hill and John Hope.

== Background ==
Wellington's army had successfully pushed the French army out of Spain, over the Pyrenees, and into south-west France. After his defeat at Nivelle, Marshal Jean-de-Dieu Soult fell back to a defensive line south of the town of Bayonne along the Adour and Nive rivers.

The rivers and the Bay of Biscay near Bayonne form a rough Greek letter Pi (π). The left vertical leg is the coast, the right vertical leg is the Nive and the crossbar is the Adour. Bayonne is located where the Nive joins the Adour. Initially, Wellington's army was confined to the area between the Bay of Biscay and the Nive. To gain room to manoeuvre, the British general had to establish his army on the east bank of the Nive. Wellington's dilemma was that by separating two wings of his army, he would leave himself open to defeat in detail. Soult, a wily strategist, understood this and tried to take advantage of the situation. By moving the French army through the fortified city of Bayonne, Soult could easily switch his army from one bank of the Nive to the other.

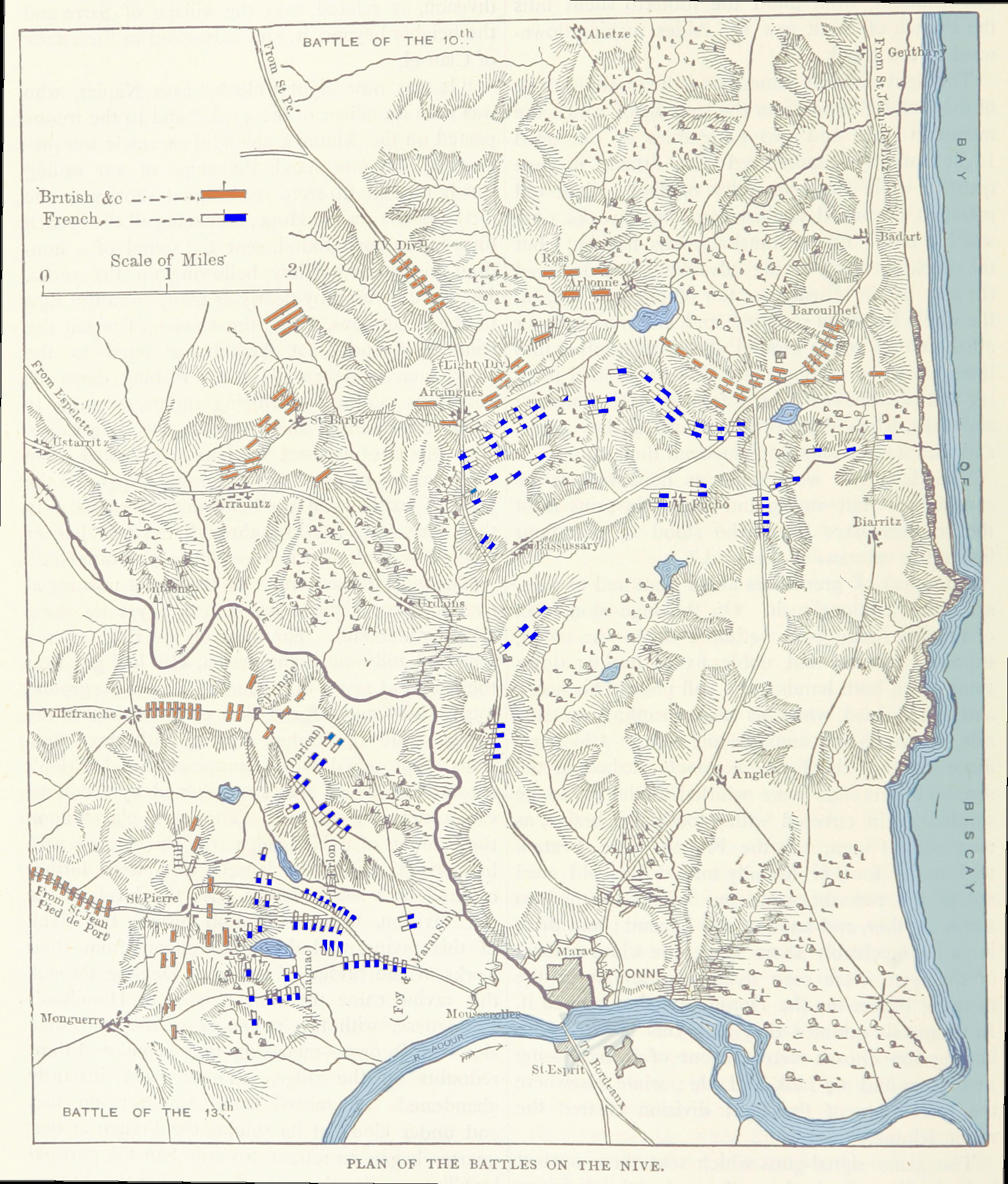
Map showing the Battle of the Nive. (North to the bottom-right.)

== Battle of the Nive ==
Despite poor weather, Hill led five Anglo-Portuguese divisions (the 2nd, the 3rd, the 6th, the Portuguese, and Pablo Morillo's Spanish Divisions) across to the east bank of the Nive near Ustaritz on 9 December. Meanwhile, the remainder of the British force under Hope (1st, 5th and Light Divisions, Thomas Bradford and Alexander Campbell's independent Portuguese brigades, Lord Aylmer's British brigade and one brigade of the 7th Division) launched diversionary attacks towards Bayonne on the west bank of the Nive. Wellington's Reserve included the 4th and 7th Divisions. About 630 casualties were suffered in these operations.

Soult launched a counter-attack with eight divisions against Hope the following day, and despite several fierce actions the British line held until reinforced by more troops coming up from Saint-Jean-de-Luz.

The right flank of Hope's line was held by one brigade of the 7th Division at the bridge of Urdains. (Note: The bridge crosses the Urdains brook (a tributary of the Nive) just north of the Château d'Urdain.) Charles Alten's Light Division defended the centre near Bassussary. The left, under John Wilson, was held by Bradford and Campbell's independent Portuguese brigades north of Barroilhet. The ravine-filled terrain forced the French into these three corridors of attack. The 5th Division lay three miles to the rear while the 1st Division and Lord Aylmer's independent British brigade were ten miles away. Though Wellington ordered the line to be fortified, Hope failed to do this.

Ignoring the impregnable position at the bridge of Urdains, Soult committed five divisions under Bertrand Clausel against Bassussary and three divisions led by Honoré Charles Reille against Barroilhet. The four divisions leading the attack were fresh while the supporting troops were tired from skirmishing with Hill's troops.

The Light Division's outpost line alertly detected the coming attack, though 50 men were cut off and captured. The French advance soon came upon the ridge of Arcangues, topped by a chateau and a church. After one attack was beaten off with ease by the 4,000 men of the Light Division, Clausel settled down to a futile artillery bombardment and probing attacks against the very strongly built structures. Aylmer's brigade arrived about 2 pm.

The picket line on Hope's left flank was quickly gobbled up by Reille's attack and 200 men captured. For the most part, the Portuguese held sturdily, but one unit was broken by French cavalry. Fighting their way back to Barroilhet, the Portuguese held onto the village and awaited reinforcements. The 5th Division arrived, but, due to a staff blunder, was low on ammunition.

Soult sent Eugene-Casimir Villatte's Reserve Division from Bayonne and one division from Clausel to assist Reille's attack. After hours of heavy fighting, he ordered one last charge. This attack drove to the mayor's house of Barroilhet, the French skirmishers wounding and nearly capturing Hope. At this point, the 1st Division came up and Soult called off his attacks soon afterward.

That night Soult's army was weakened when two Nassau battalions and the Frankfurt battalion, having learned the result of the Battle of Leipzig the previous month, went over in their entirety from the French to the Allies. A third battalion from Baden, which did not join the defection, was disarmed the following day. This event subtracted 2,000 infantry from the French army. The defection was orchestrated by the Prince of Orange, through his dynastic connections to Nassau.

Both sides lost around 1,600 troops before Soult called off the assault. Of these, the Anglo-Allies lost 500 captured, the largest total of any one day of fighting under Wellington. Clausel turned in an unusually uninspired performance on 10 December. Sporadic clashes occurred over the next two days though neither side was willing to initiate a full-scale attack.

== Battle of St. Pierre ==
On the night of 12 December, a temporary pontoon bridge over the Nive at Villefranque was washed away. This isolated Hill's 14,000 men and 10 guns on the east bank of the river, just as the French were reorganizing for an assault. The nearest bridge was at Ustaritz, which meant that the Reserve had to march three times farther than if the washed-out bridge had been intact.

Seizing his opportunity, Soult rapidly switched six divisions and 22 guns to the east bank of the Nive and attacked Hill. Though delayed by congestion at the bridge over the Adour, Soult's attack against the British positions on the ridge around Saint-Pierre-d'Irube was powerful enough for one British lieutenant colonel to flee the field, taking his battalion (1/3rd Buffs Foot) with him. Soult outnumbered Hill's corps by three-to-one. Defending a line between Petit Mouguerre (Elizaberry) and the Nive, the Allied corps held on for hours in a bitter fight. The capable Hill performed superbly, feeding in his few reserves with skill and exhorting his troops.

However, after the arrival of reinforcements under Wellington, the French troops refused to continue the attack. The French near-mutiny forced Soult to reluctantly retreat into Bayonne, having lost 3,000 men against Anglo-Portuguese losses of 1,750. The Allied army commander rode up to his subordinate and congratulated him, "Hill, the day's your own."

It was on this day that General Hill was heard, for only the second time in the entire war, to use profanity. When Wellington heard about it he remarked that "if Hill has begun to swear, they all must mind what they are about".

== Aftermath ==
Storms and torrential rain precluded any further action for two months. Eventually, between 23 and 27 February, Wellington cut off Bayonne by crossing the mouth of the Adour west of the city. (Note: The defence by the 500 men holding the bridgehead against an attack by about 700+ French was settled by a discharge of Congreve rockets at very close range, .) Leaving Hope to seal up the 17,000-strong French garrison, Wellington relentlessly pursued Soult and the rest of his army.

== Guerrillas ==
Wellington greatly feared an outbreak of guerrilla warfare against his soldiers by the French people. He was mindful that after the Battle of Nivelle, Spanish troops had indulged in plundering French civilians. Accordingly, he took pains to send most of his Spanish units back to their home country, rightly concerned that they would inflict the same atrocities on French civilians that their own had suffered from Napoleon's armies. At first, only Pablo Morillo's division was brought forward because it depended on the British payroll and supply train. As in Spain, Wellington harshly punished any British soldiers caught marauding.

As it happened, the French troops, hardened by years of plundering foreign civilians, began to despoil their own citizens. Actually, despite their French citizenship, the inhabitants south and east of Bayonne were Basque people for the most part, often unable to speak and/or understand French. Soult tried to crack down on looting, hanging offenders and even shooting a much-decorated captain, but he was unable to stop it. As one historian noted, "The civilians soon came to the conclusion that only a swift allied victory could save their countryside." Consequently, Wellington had little to fear from French guerrilla action.

== Commentary ==
Soult's strategy was masterful. Twice he fell upon isolated allied forces in greatly superior strength. As usual, his tactical direction left a lot to be desired. Wellington can be criticized for not anticipating Soult's moves and being away from the critical point in both battles. Wellington spoke truthfully when he later said, "I will tell you the difference between Soult and me: when he gets into a difficulty, his troops don't get him out of it; mine always do."

== Nomenclature ==
The action of 9–12 December is called The Battle of the Nive, while Hill's defensive battle of 13 December is known as The Battle of St. Pierre, while the entire period is collectively referred to as The Battles of the Nive in.

The Encyclopaedia Britannica (1911) article on the Peninsular War calls the actions the Battles before Bayonne, or Battles of the Nive, Dec, 10–13, 1813.
