= Torgau (disambiguation) =

Torgau is a town in Saxony, Germany.

Torgau may also refer to:

== Geography ==
- Torgau-Oschatz, a former district in Saxony, Germany from 1996 to 2008

== History ==
- League of Torgau, a 1526 alliance of Lutheran princes in Saxony
- Battle of Torgau, a 1760 battle between Prussians and Austrians during the Seven Years' War
- Siege of Torgau, a siege of Torgau in 1813–14 during the War of the Sixth Coalition

== Games ==
- Torgau (wargame), a 1974 board wargame that simulates the 1760 battle

== Other ==
- Torgau (horse), a thoroughbred race horse
