= French invasion =

French invasion may refer to:

- Category:Invasions by France
- Category:Invasions of France

== See also ==
- Invasion of Isle de France, 1810 British invasion of what is now called Mauritius
- Invasion of Southern France (disambiguation)
