= Invasion of Southern France =

The Invasion of Southern France may refer to:

- the French Revolutionary Wars invasion attempts to defeat the French Revolution
  - the 1793 War of the Pyrenees, luso-spanish forces supported by the British navy attempted to invade southern France
  - the 1793 Siege of Toulon, led by a British-backed force of French Emigres
  - the 1814 Campaign in south-west France, a British-led coalition invaded Napoleon's France to the south
- the World War II invasions
  - the June 1940 Italian invasion of France, started by Fascist Italy's invasion of the Alps
  - the August 1944 Operation Dragoon, the Allied invasion of the south of France
