= Prussian Regiment (France) =

- Régiment de Prusse / Preußisches Regiment
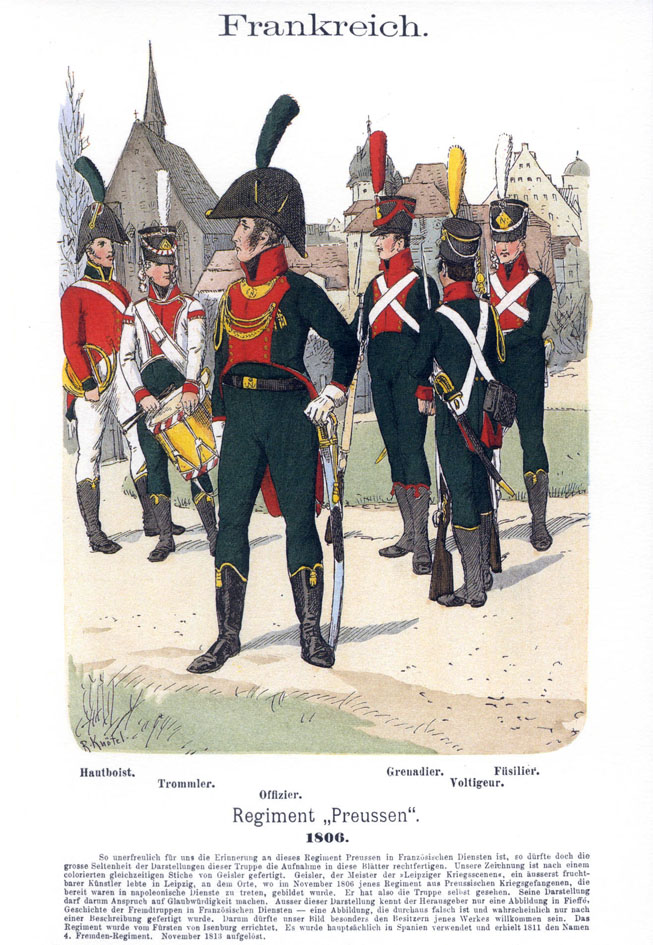
- Uniforms of the Prussian Regiment by Richard Knötel
- Active: 1806–1813
- Country: France
- Branch: French Army
- Type: Infantry
- Size: Regiment of three battalions
- Dépôt: Leipzig, Kingdom of Saxony
- Engagements: Napoleonic Wars; Peninsular War; Dos de Mayo Uprising; Siege of Astorga; Battle of Bussaco; War of the Fifth Coalition; Walcheren Campaign

The Prussian Regiment (French: Régiment de Prusse) was a foreign regiment of the French Imperial Army formed in late 1806 and made up by Prussian prisoners of war. The regiment saw service in the Peninsular War and was disbanded in 1813 following the 1813 reorganisation of the foreign regiments.

== Formation ==
The Prussian Regiment was ordered to be formed on 13 November 1806, at the end of the Prussian campaign of the War of the Fourth Coalition, by means of a letter from Marshal Berthier on behalf of Napoleon I to Prince Isenburg. Napoleon instructed Isenburg to select officers for the new foreign regiment from Prussian prisoners of war, while non-commissioned soldiers were to be selected from Prussians who had deserted the Prussian Army. The Regiment was formed as an infantry regiment with three battalions; however, the exact organization is not known, and it may have been formed as a light infantry regiment or a line infantry regiment.

The formation of the Prussian Regiment took place at Leipzig between November and December 1806. The recruiting poster for the Prussian Regiment was drafted by Isenburg and read:

Valiant warriors, rally to the standards of Napoleon the Great and follow his steps which will guide you to victory and immortal renown.

The Prussian Regiment was quickly formed and Isenburg was promoted to Brigade General (Général de Brigade) on 16 December 1806.

== Operational history ==
After the Prussian Regiment was formed, it was transferred from Germany to France for garrison duties. Although desertion was a problem, on 19 November 1807 the Prussian Regiment still had a strength of 2,700 men. In early 1808 the 1st battalion of Prussian Regiment was given an active role and assigned to the 3rd Division of Marshal Moncey's Coast Observation Corps in Spain. The 1st battalion took part in the suppression of the revolt in Madrid on 2 May 1808. After taking part in the French offensive in Spain at Valencia in June, the 1st battalion was assigned to garrison duty at Vitoria.

Meanwhile, the 2nd and 3rd battalions been stationed in Flushing, Netherlands. In the summer of 1808 the British attacked the town of Flushing, although both battalions defended the town, both were captured and the soldiers become British prisoners of war. The 2nd battalion of Prussian Regiment was ordered re-formed from new recruits and the regimental depot battalion.

In early 1810 a new 2nd battalion was ready and was sent to Spain. The new battalion; however, suffered from high desertion, many of the deserters joined the guerrillas fighting against the French in Spain. Early in 1810 the 2nd battalion of the Prussian Regiment was assigned to General Junot's VIII Corps fighting in Portugal. On 21 April the battalion captured the town of Astorga in heavy fighting.

On 5 August Napoleon order that both the 1st and 2nd battalions of the Prussian Regiment be combined and fight together. The Prussian Regiment served in Portugal from 1810 to 1811, during this time the regiment helped protect French artillery and baggage from being captured in a surprise attack. The Prussian Regiment also fought at the Battle of Bussaco. In the spring of 1811 the Prussian Regiment was assigned to garrison duty in Spain at Ciudad Rodrigo and fought an action near there on 18 June 1811. From the summer of 1811 onwards the Prussian Regiment remained on garrison duty. On 3 August the Prussian Regiment was renamed the 4th Foreign Regiment (4éme Régiment Etranger). The regiment performed poorly during a British attack on a bridge near Almaraz, guarded by the regiment on 18 May 1812. During the attack the commander of the regiment left his post and the regiment became disorganized, abandoning the bridge. The 1st battalion lost its standard, the regiment never fired a shot during the engagement. The few survivors of the Prussian Regiment were ordered back to the regimental depot at Lille in France. There, the re-formed 1st Battalion and existing 5th Battalion received a favourable inspection report in November 1812 for good experience and discipline, although there were 'a certain number of officers from Prussia and from countries at war with France who could not be counted on completely.' Napoleon considered using the regiment to help make up for losses suffered in the Russian campaign, but decided against it on 12 January 1813: 'If the men are mostly Prussian, they will not be worth anything and they should be left in Holland.'

The regiment was in garrison in The Hague in 1813. On 15 November, riots broke out in Amsterdam, which led to a revolt against the French occupation. The regiment marched towards Delft on the 18th, but the next day, 200 men returned, wearing orange cockades. The men were organised on the 22nd into the Bataljon Oranje-Pruisen (Dutch; the "Orange-Prussia Battalion") and sent to Rotterdam. The rank and file were openly defecting to the allies. The last time the Prussian Regiment is known to have seen action was during the defence of Woerden on 24 November 1813. The regiment was officially disbanded the next day on 25 November 1813. The Orange-Prussia Battalion was one of the earliest regular units of the new Dutch army.

== Disbandment ==
On 25 November 1813 the Prussian Regiment was disbanded by Napoleon's decree. Trusted men were assigned to the 3rd Foreign Regiment (3éme Régiment Etranger) while the others were assigned to a new Foreign Pioneer Regiment, which was formed at Arras on 19 December 1813. The decree had no practical effect on the two understrength battalions under the command of colonel Falba who were besieged in Holland, and survived until peace went into effect.
