= Siege of Tortosa =

Siege of Tortosa may refer to:

- Siege of Tortosa (809)
- Siege of Tortosa (1148)
- Siege of Tortosa (1642)
- Siege of Tortosa (1648)
- Siege of Tortosa (1650)
- Siege of Tortosa (1708)
- Siege of Tortosa (1810–11)
