= Siege of Magdeburg =

A number of events in history are known as the siege of Magdeburg, including:

- Siege of Magdeburg (1550–1551), a siege of the Protestant German city by forces of Maurice, Elector of Saxony and Georg von Mecklenburg (POW), trying to reinstate the rule of the archbishopric
- Siege of Magdeburg (1631) or Sack of Magdeburg, a siege followed by plundering and extensive destruction of the German city by the forces of the Holy Roman Empire and Catholic League during the Thirty Years' War.
- Siege of Magdeburg (1806), a siege of the German city by forces of the First French Empire during the War of the Fourth Coalition, resulting in the surrender of a Prussian garrison
- Siege of Magdeburg (1809), a siege of the German city by a Prussian partisan force under Ferdinand von Schill during the War of the Fifth Coalition, resulting in the defeat of a French garrison
- Siege of Magdeburg (1813–1814), a siege of the German city by forces of the First French Empire during the War of the Sixth Coalition, which ended with Napoleon's abdication
