= Battle of Claye =

Battle during the War of the Sixth Coalition

Coordinates: 48.9438°N 2.668°E

- Part of the War of the Sixth Coalition
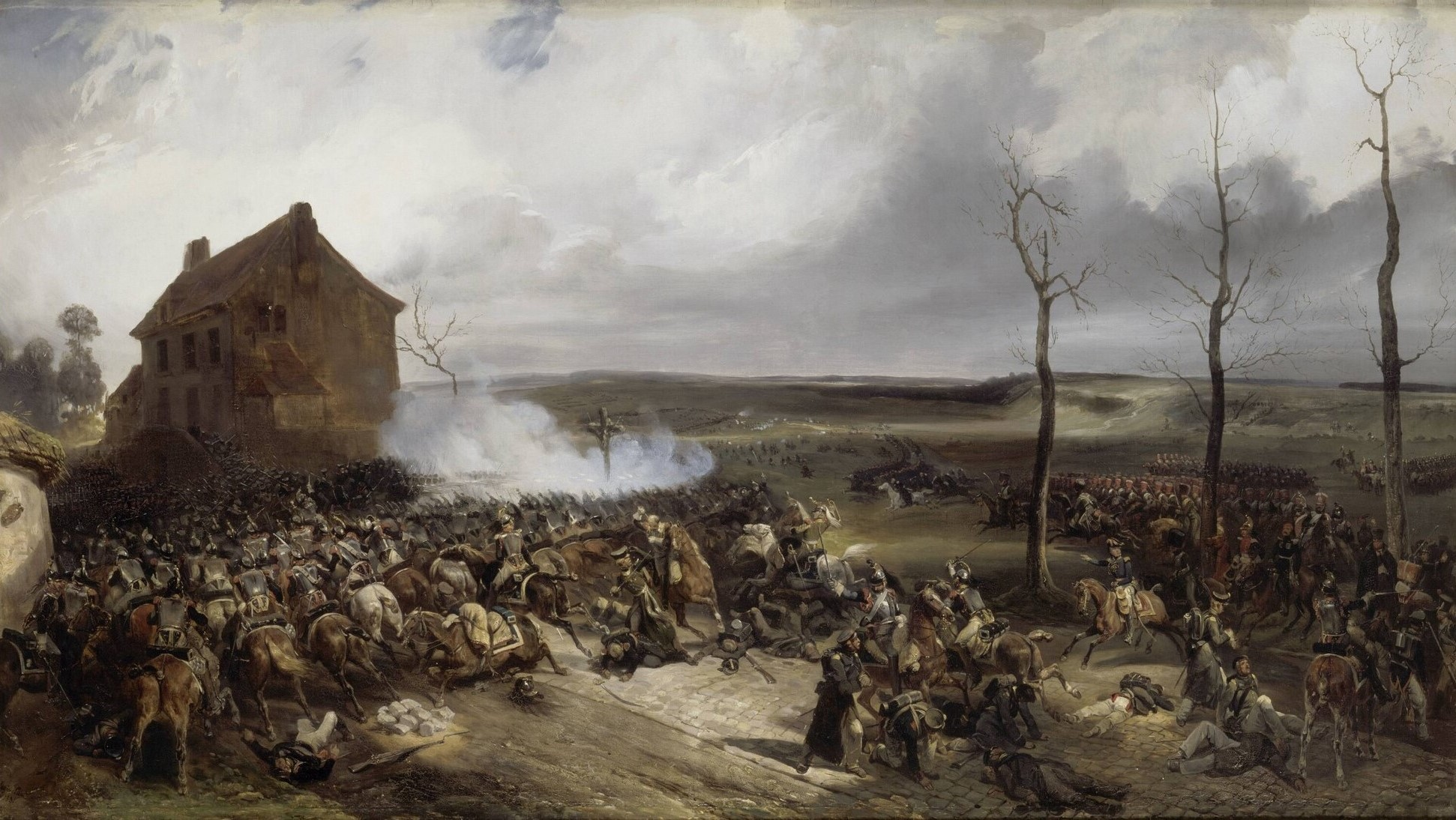
- Combat of Claye, 27 March 1814 by Eugène Lami, 1831
Date	28 March 1814
Location	Claye, France
Result	Inconclusive

Belligerents
France	Prussia

Commanders and leaders
(France) Jean Dominique Compans	(Kingdom of Prussia) Czettritz und Neuhaus (Kingdom of Prussia) Ludwig Yorck von Wartenburg (Kingdom of Prussia) Friedrich Graf Kleist von Nollendorf

Strength
3,000 infantry 1,700 cavalry	2,600 infantry 1,900 cavalry 16 cannons

Casualties and losses
200 dead 150 captured	600 dead 145–500 captured

The Battle of Claye took place during the War of the Sixth Coalition. Both sides made advances, but the French force, which was perceived by the Prussians to be much smaller, dealt many casualties to the Prussian troops. Some sources claim the battle was a victory for Prussia, while others claim the battle may have resulted in a French victory.
