= Battle of Villafranca =

Battle of Villafranca may refer to:

- Battle of Villafranca (1744), during the War of the Austrian Succession
- Battle of Villafranca (1809), during the Peninsular War
