= Thomas Sutherland (artist) =

English painter (1785–1838)

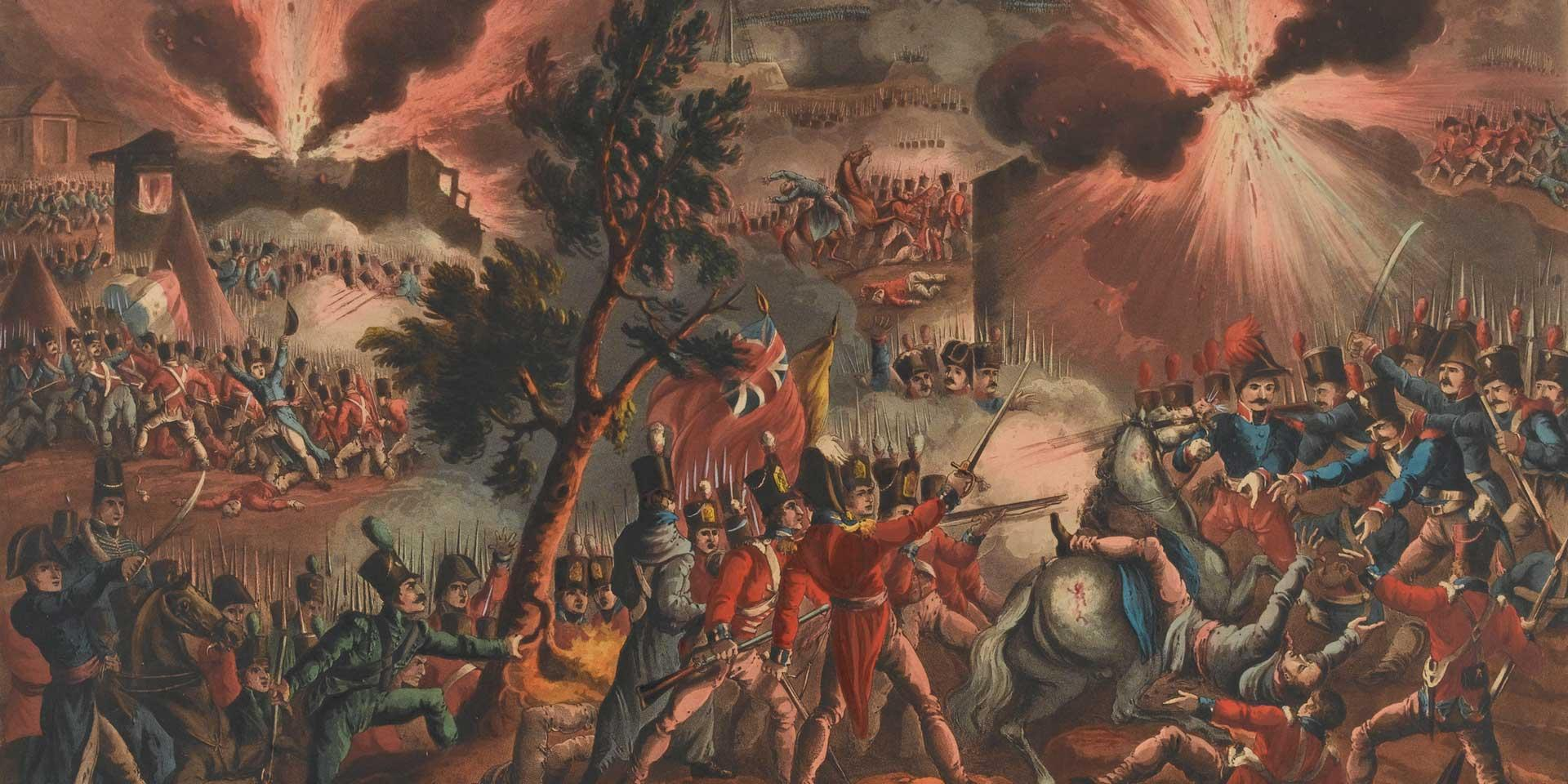
- A depiction of the French sortie at the Battle of Bayonne (April 1814). Initial sketch by William Heath (London Gazette, June 1815).
- Born: 1785
- Died: 1838 (aged 52–53)

Thomas Sutherland (1785–1838) was a British engraver and aquatinter. As well as contributing illustrations to Rudolf Ackermann's The Microcosm of London, he also produced a series of prints based on the Peninsular War.
