= Siege of Torgau =

1813 siege during the War of the Sixth Coalition

- Part of the German campaign of the Sixth Coalition
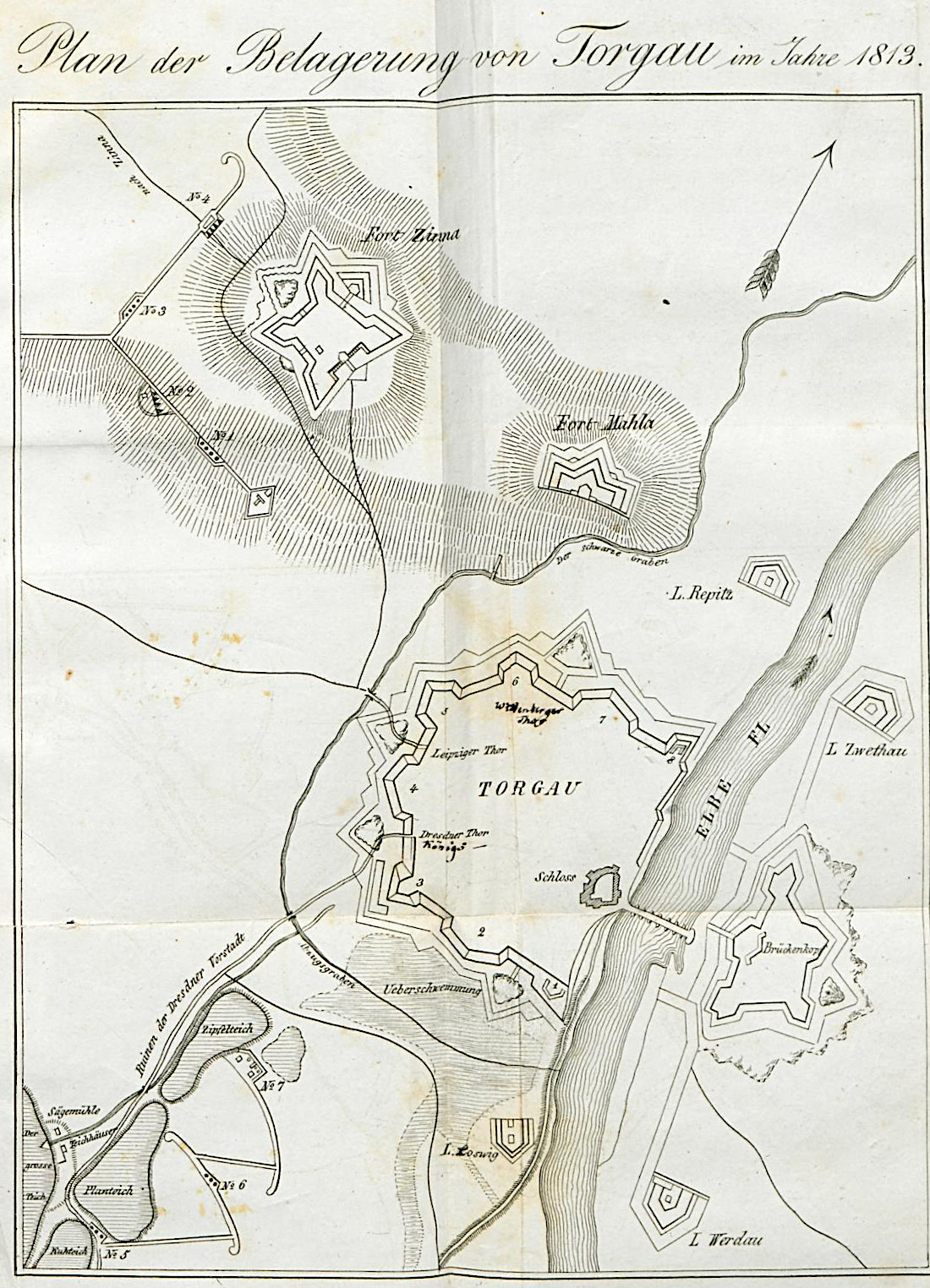
- Plan of the siege of Torgau
Date	18 October 1813 – 10 January 1814
Location	Torgau, Saxony 51°34′30″N 12°55′30″E
Result	Prussian victory

Belligerents
(Kingdom of Prussia) Prussia	(First French Empire) French Empire

Commanders and leaders
Bogislav von Tauntzien	Louis, comte de Narbonne-Lara; Adrien Jean-Baptiste du Bosc

Strength
23,000	24,650

Casualties and losses
Minimal	All army
- Location within Europe

The siege of Torgau (18 October 1813 – 10 January 1814) was a siege in the War of the Sixth Coalition. The French-held fortress on the Elbe was besieged by Prussian troops and forced to surrender.

== Background ==
The fortified city of Torgau was built on both sides of the Elbe as a royal Saxon main arsenal based on a design by Ernst Ludwig von Aster. Its defenses consisted of a strong outer wall, fosses, and external works. There were seven bastion fronts along the perimeter of the wall. In the spring of 1813, the French moved into the position. After the Battle of Dennewitz it covered the retreat of the French. During the Armistice of Pläswitz, provisions were insufficiently available to protect the Middle Elbe and to enable offensives against the Prussian heartland.

== Siege ==
After the Battle of Leipzig, the fortress was besieged by the IV Army Corps with around 23,000 men under Bogislav Friedrich Emanuel von Tauentzien. The French trains and the civil servants fled to the fortress, so that the garrison strength grew from 6,000 to 30,000 men. In addition, there were around 11,000 wounded in the hospitals. The French garrison commander Louis, comte de Narbonne-Lara died of typhus on 17 November.

Narbonne attempted to negotiate surrender from 4 to 7 December, but Tauentzien did not accept his proposals. Further talks were held that month, before agreement for a ceasefire was finally reached on 20 December. General Adrien Jean-Baptiste du Bosc surrendered on the 26th of December, with about 7,200 men being taken prisoner on 10 January 1814 and 2,400 remaining in the hospitals.
