= Château d'Urdain =

Coordinates: 43.44170°N 1.48886°W

Château d'Urdain (Occitan: Castèl d'Urdan; Basque: Urdain gaztela) is located on the Bayonne–Ustaritz road close to the west bank of the river Nive. It was built in the early 19th century and was the home of Dominique Joseph Garat a French writer and revolutionary politician who was for a time Minister of Justice.

The Château, known to British troops as "Garat's House", was occupied by British soldiers during Wellington's advance into France in late 1813 while the nearby Urdain brook (a western tributary of the Nieve) was the front line. (Note: "On Christmas Eve 1813 the privates of a company of the 95th holding the line in front of the Chateau of Urdains 'clubbed half a dollar each' and sent a man into the French lines to purchase brandy. The messenger succeeded in buying it in plenty, but sampled it so freely that the French sentry on the high road had to shout to the English sentry opposite to send a party to carry him in, as he was lying drunk and incapable by the wayside" (Oman 1930, p. 294).)
